= Ronald Archie Nussbaum =

American herpetologist (born 1942)

- Born: February 9, 1942 (age 84); Rupert, Idaho, United States
- Died: May 27, 2024 (aged 82); Ann Arbor, Michigan, United States
- Occupation: Herpetologist
- Employer: University of Michigan

Ronald Archie Nussbaum (born February 9, 1942) is an American herpetologist. He works with evolutionary biology and ecology of amphibians and reptiles, including systematics of caecilians and salamanders. He is a professor emeritus at the University of Michigan.

== Education ==
Nussbaum possesses a bachelor's, master's, and doctorate in biology from the University of Idaho, Central Washington University, and Oregon State University, respectively.

== Taxa described ==
- Amietophrynus Frost, Grant, Faivovich, Bain, Haas, Haddad, de Sá, Channing, Wilkinson, Donnellan, Raxworthy, Campbell, Blotto, Moler, Drewes, Nussbaum, Lynch, Green & Wheeler, 2006
- Amphiglossus anosyensis Raxworthy & Nussbaum, 1993
- Amphiglossus mandokava Raxworthy & Nussbaum, 1993
- Amphiglossus punctatus Raxworthy & Nussbaum, 1993
- Atretochoana Nussbaum & Wilkinson, 1995
- Boulengerula fischeri Nussbaum & Hinkel, 1994
- Brookesia ambreensis Raxworthy & Nussbaum, 1995
- Brookesia antakarana Raxworthy & Nussbaum, 1995
- Brookesia bekolosy Raxworthy & Nussbaum, 1995
- Brookesia brygooi Raxworthy & Nussbaum, 1995
- Brookesia lineata Raxworthy & Nussbaum, 1995
- Brookesia lolontany Raxworthy & Nussbaum, 1995
- Calumma amber Raxworthy & Nussbaum, 2006
- Calumma crypticum Raxworthy & Nussbaum, 2006
- Calumma hafahafa Raxworthy & Nussbaum, 2006
- Calumma jejy Raxworthy & Nussbaum, 2006
- Calumma peltierorum Raxworthy & Nussbaum, 2006
- Calumma tsycorne Raxworthy & Nussbaum, 2006
- Chthonerpeton exile Nussbaum & Wilkinson, 1987
- Chthonerpeton onorei Nussbaum, 1986
- Chthonerpeton perissodus Nussbaum & Wilkinson, 1987
- Crotaphatrema lamottei (Nussbaum, 1981)
- Crotaphatrema Nussbaum, 1985
- Dicamptodon copei Nussbaum, 1970
- Duttaphrynus Frost, Grant, Faivovich, Bain, Haas, Haddad, de Sá, Channing, Wilkinson, Donnellan, Raxworthy, Campbell, Blotto, Moler, Drewes, Nussbaum, Lynch, Green & Wheeler, 2006
- Ebenavia maintimainty Nussbaum & Raxworthy, 1998
- Echinotriton Nussbaum & Brodie, 1982
- Feihyla Frost, Grant, Faivovich, Bain, Haas, Haddad, de Sá, Channing, Wilkinson, Donnellan, Raxworthy, Campbell, Blotto, Moler, Drewes, Nussbaum, Lynch, Green & Wheeler, 2006
- Heteroliodon fohy Glaw, Vences & Nussbaum, 2005
- Heteroliodon lava Nussbaum & Raxworthy, 2000
- Hypogeophis pti Maddock, Wilkinson, Nussbaum & Gower, 2017
- Ingerophrynus Frost, Grant, Faivovich, Bain, Haas, Haddad, de Sá, Channing, Wilkinson, Donnellan, Raxworthy, Campbell, Blotto, Moler, Drewes, Nussbaum, Lynch, Green & Wheeler, 2006
- Litoria michaeltyleri Frost, Grant, Faivovich, Bain, Haas, Haddad, de Sá, Channing, Wilkinson, Donnellan, Raxworthy, Campbell, Blotto, Moler, Drewes, Nussbaum, Lynch, Green & Wheeler, 2006
- Madascincus minutus Raxworthy & Nussbaum, 1993
- Matoatoa spannringi Nussbaum, Raxworthy & Pronk, 1998
- Microcaecilia grandis Wilkinson, Nussbaum & Hoogmoed, 2010
- Microcaecilia taylori Nussbaum & Hoogmoed, 1979
- Microgale fotsifotsy Jenkins, Raxworthy & Nussbaum, 1997
- Mimosiphonops reinhardti Wilkinson & Nussbaum, 1992
- Paragehyra gabriellae Nussbaum & Raxworthy, 1994
- Paroedura karstophila Nussbaum & Raxworthy, 2000
- Paroedura maingoka Nussbaum & Raxworthy, 2000
- Paroedura masobe Nussbaum & Raxworthy, 1994
- Paroedura tanjaka Nussbaum & Raxworthy, 2000
- Paroedura vahiny Nussbaum & Raxworthy, 2000
- Paroedura vazimba Nussbaum & Raxworthy, 2000
- Phelsuma antanosy Raxworthy & Nussbaum, 1993
- Phelsuma malamakibo Nussbaum, Raxworthy, Raselimanana & Ramanamanjato, 2000
- Phelsuma masohoala Raxworthy & Nussbaum, 1994
- Plethodontohyla mihanika Vences, Raxworthy, Nussbaum & Glaw, 2003
- Poyntonophrynus Frost, Grant, Faivovich, Bain, Haas, Haddad, de Sá, Channing, Wilkinson, Donnellan, Raxworthy, Campbell, Blotto, Moler, Drewes, Nussbaum, Lynch, Green & Wheeler, 2006
- Pseudepidalea Frost, Grant, Faivovich, Bain, Haas, Haddad, de Sá, Channing, Wilkinson, Donnellan, Raxworthy, Campbell, Blotto, Moler, Drewes, Nussbaum, Lynch, Green & Wheeler, 2006
- Pseudoacontias angelorum Nussbaum & Raxworthy, 1995
- Pseudoxyrhopus analabe Nussbaum, Andreone & Raxworthy, 1998
- Pseudoxyrhopus ankafinaensis Raxworthy & Nussbaum, 1994
- Pseudoxyrhopus kely Raxworthy & Nussbaum, 1994
- Pseudoxyrhopus sokosoko Raxworthy & Nussbaum, 1994
- Rhinatrematidae Nussbaum, 1977
- Scaphiophryne boribory Vences, Raxworthy, Nussbaum & Glaw, 2003
- Sechellophryne Nussbaum & Wu, 2007
- Trachylepis dumasi (Nussbaum & Raxworthy, 1995)
- Trachylepis lavarambo (Nussbaum & Raxworthy, 1998)
- Trachylepis nancycoutuae (Nussbaum & Raxworthy, 1998)
- Trachylepis tandrefana (Nussbaum, Raxworthy & Ramanamanjato, 1999)
- Trachylepis tavaratra (Ramanamanjato, Nussbaum & Raxworthy, 1999)
- Trachylepis vato (Nussbaum & Raxworthy, 1994)
- Trachylepis vezo (Ramanamanjato, Nussbaum & Raxworthy, 1999)
- Trachylepis volamenaloha(Nussbaum, Raxworthy & Ramanamanjato, 1999)
- Uraeotyphlus gansi Gower, Rajendran, Nussbaum & Wilkinson, 2008
- Uroplatus malahelo Nussbaum & Raxworthy, 1994
- Uroplatus malama Nussbaum & Raxworthy, 1995
- Vandijkophrynus Frost, Grant, Faivovich, Bain, Haas, Haddad, de Sá, Channing, Wilkinson, Donnellan, Raxworthy, Campbell, Blotto, Moler, Drewes, Nussbaum, Lynch, Green & Wheeler, 2006
- Zonosaurus anelanelany Raselimanana, Raxworthy & Nussbaum, 2000
- Zonosaurus bemaraha Raselimanana, Raxworthy & Nussbaum, 2000
- Zonosaurus maramaintso Raselimanana, Nussbaum & Raxworthy, 2006
- Zonosaurus tsingy Raselimanana, Raxworthy & Nussbaum, 2000
