= Uroplatus malahelo =

Conservation status
- Endangered (IUCN 3.1)

Scientific classification
- Kingdom: Animalia
- Phylum: Chordata
- Class: Reptilia
- Order: Squamata
- Suborder: Gekkota
- Family: Gekkonidae
- Genus: Uroplatus
- Species: U. malahelo

Binomial name
- Uroplatus malahelo Nussbaum & Raxworthy, 1994

Species of lizard

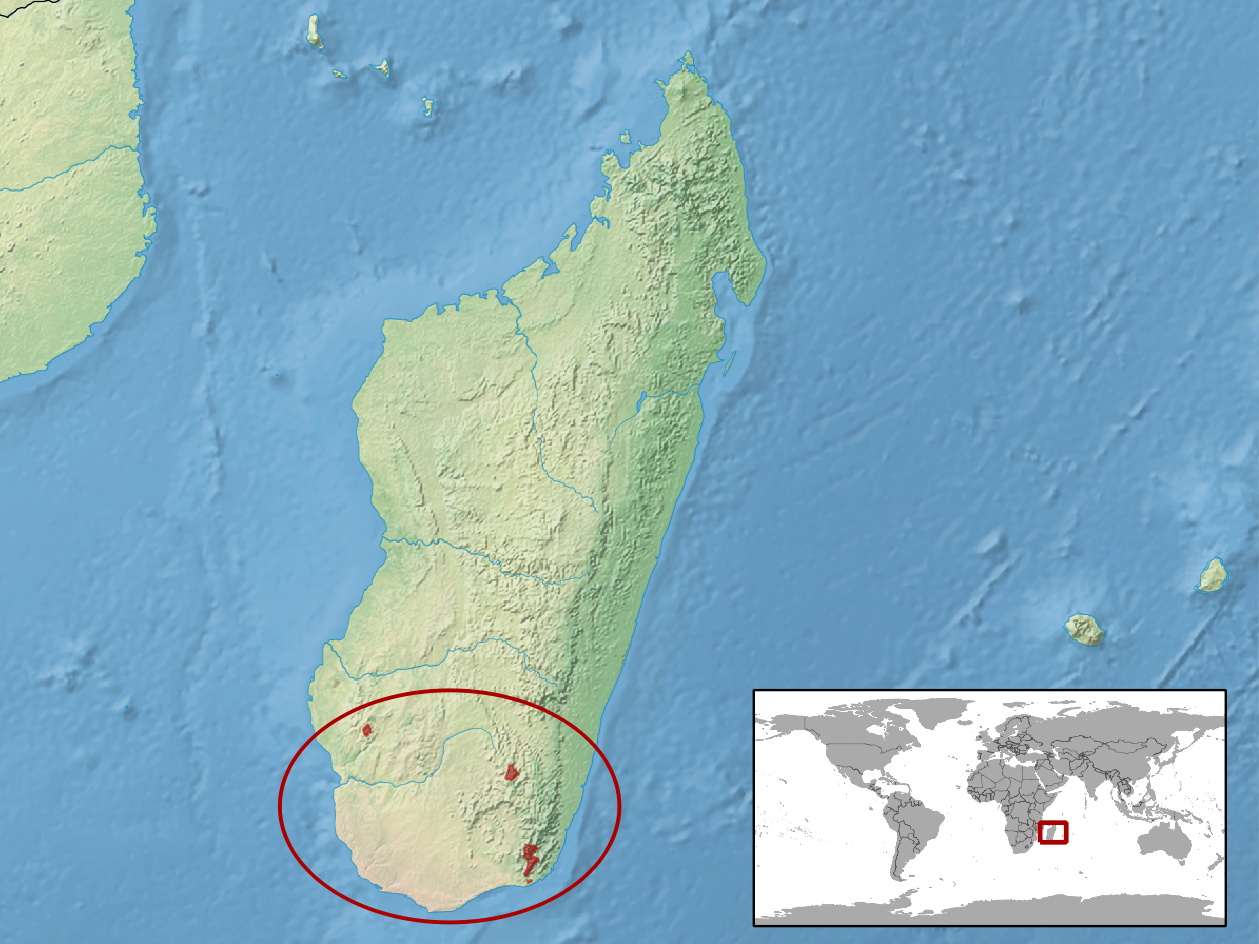
Geographic distribution of Uroplatus malahelo

Uroplatus malahelo is a species of lizard in the family Gekkonidae. It is endemic to Madagascar.
