= Phelsuma masohoala =

Conservation status
- Critically Endangered (IUCN 3.1)

Scientific classification
- Kingdom: Animalia
- Phylum: Chordata
- Class: Reptilia
- Order: Squamata
- Suborder: Gekkota
- Family: Gekkonidae
- Genus: Phelsuma
- Species: P. masohoala

Binomial name
- Phelsuma masohoala Raxworthy & Nussbaum, 1994
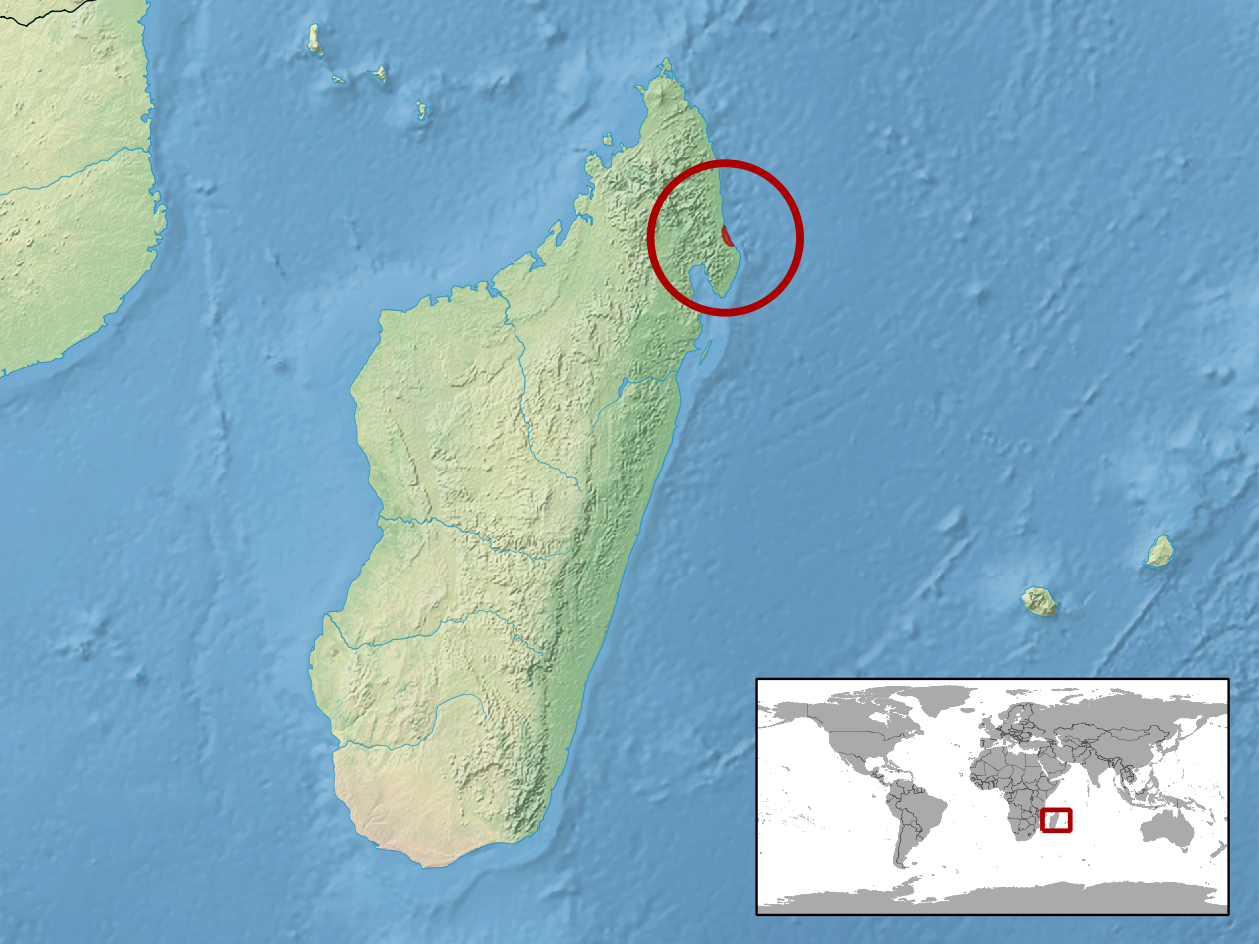

Species of lizard

Phelsuma masohoala is a species of gecko endemic to the Sava Region of Madagascar.
