= Trachylepis volamenaloha =

Conservation status
- Near Threatened (IUCN 3.1)

Scientific classification
- Kingdom: Animalia
- Phylum: Chordata
- Class: Reptilia
- Order: Squamata
- Family: Scincidae
- Genus: Trachylepis
- Species: T. volamenaloha

Binomial name
- Trachylepis volamenaloha (Nussbaum, Raxworthy, & Ramanamanjato, 1999)
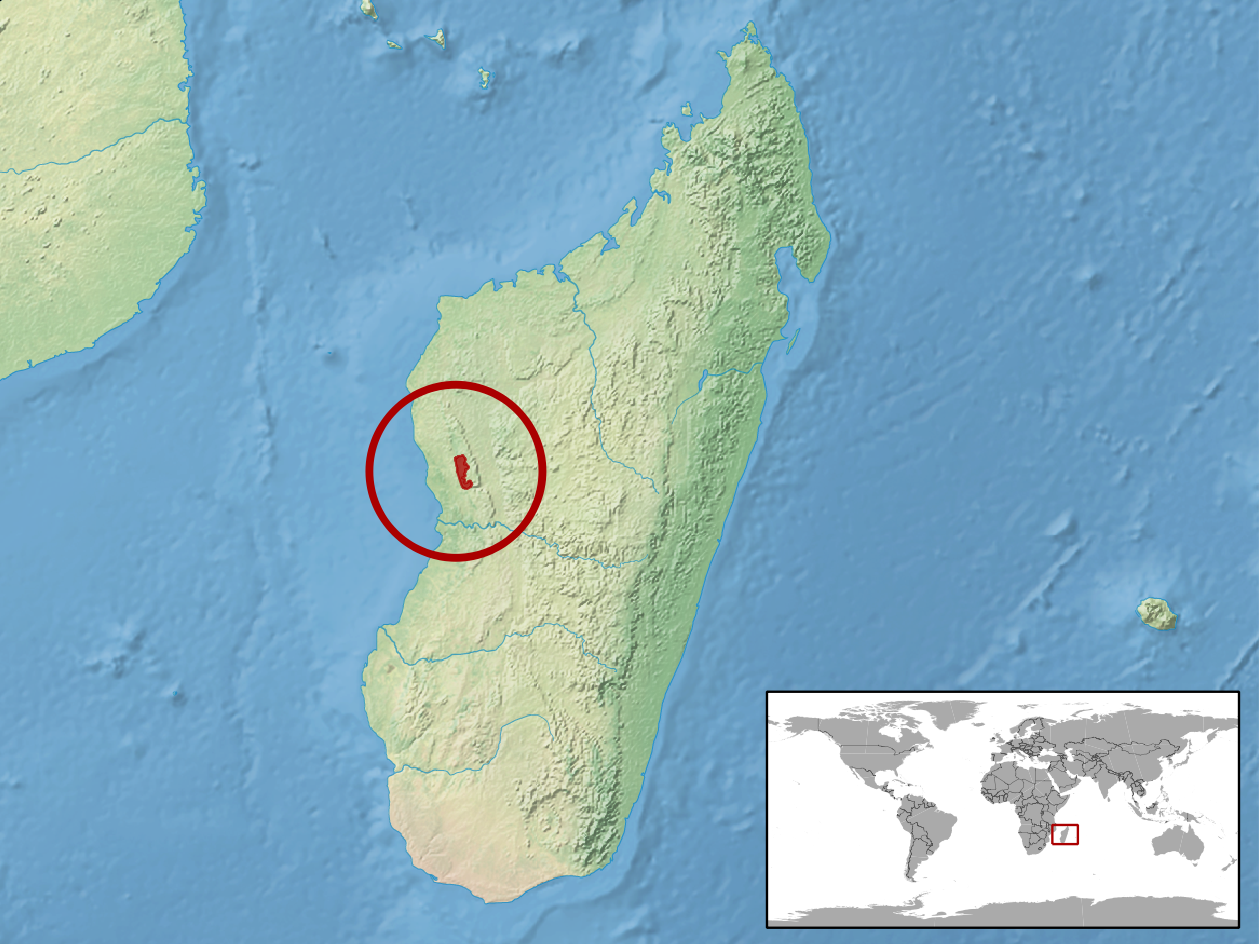

Species of reptile

Trachylepis volamenaloha is a species of skink, a lizard in the family Scincidae.

The species is endemic to Madagascar.
