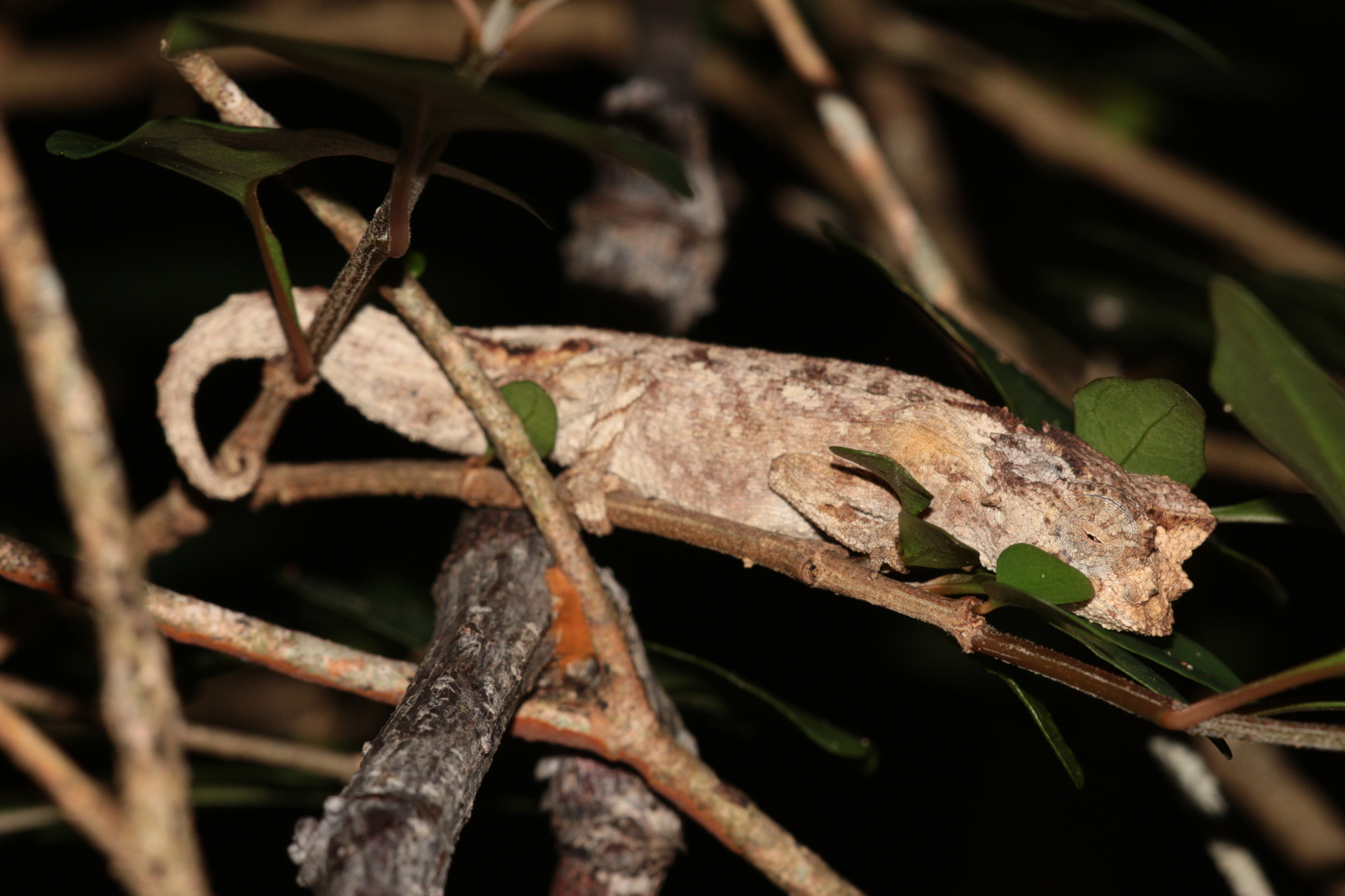

Conservation status
- Least Concern (IUCN 3.1)

Scientific classification
- Kingdom: Animalia
- Phylum: Chordata
- Class: Reptilia
- Order: Squamata
- Suborder: Iguania
- Family: Chamaeleonidae
- Genus: Brookesia
- Species: B. brygooi

Binomial name
- Brookesia brygooi Raxworthy & Nussbaum, 1995
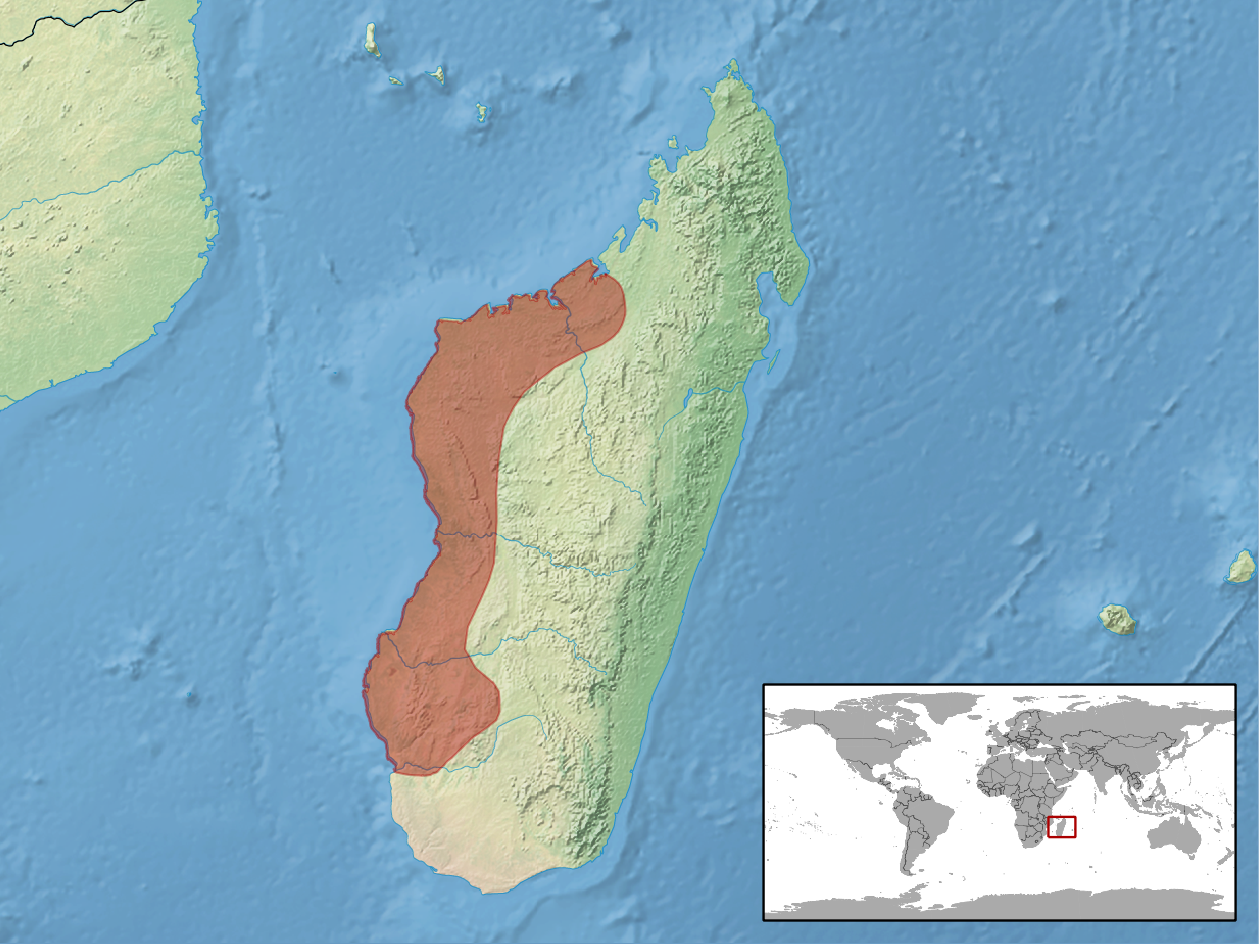

= Brookesia brygooi =

Species of lizard

Brookesia brygooi, commonly known as Brygoo's chameleon, Brygoo's pygmy chameleon, and the leaf chameleon, is a species of chameleon, a lizard in the family Chameleonidae. The species, which is endemic to Madagascar, was first described in 1995 by Raxworthy and Nussbaum and named in compliment to French herpetologist Édouard-Raoul Brygoo.

A Brygoo's chameleon at a reptile expo in Las Vegas.

== Conservation status ==
The International Union for Conservation of Nature classed B. brygooi as Least Concern.

== Distribution and habitat ==
B. brygooi is endemic to southwestern Madagascar, where its type locality is Analavelona, Fianarantsoa Province, south-central Madagascar. Because it is widespread and commonly found in protected areas, it was listed as Least Concern by the International Union for Conservation of Nature. It can be found at elevations between 20 and 571 m (66 and 1,873 ft) above mean sea level (AMSL), and over an area of 147,782 square kilometres (57,059 square miles). Details about the true population of B. brygooi are unknown, although it is known to be widespread. It is found in many protected parks/areas/nature reserves, and is also protected under the Madagascar laws.

== Description ==
B. brygooi has an "unusual" shape of body and is earthy in colour.

== Diet ==
The diet of B. brygooi includes insects.

== Behavior ==
B. brygooi spends the night resting on twigs.

== Reproduction ==
The female of B. brygooi lays two to five eggs per clutch. The eggs measure 2.5 by 1.5 mm (0.098 by 0.059 in) each.

== Taxonomy ==
This species was initially described by Raxworthy and Nussbaum in 1995 under the name of Brookesia brygooi. The same scientific name was later used by Nečas in 1999, and, most recently by Townsend et al. in 2009. According to the ITIS, the taxonomic status of B. brygooi is valid. It is commonly known as the leaf chameleon.
