= Paroedura vazimba =

Conservation status
- Vulnerable (IUCN 3.1)

Scientific classification
- Kingdom: Animalia
- Phylum: Chordata
- Class: Reptilia
- Order: Squamata
- Suborder: Gekkota
- Family: Gekkonidae
- Genus: Paroedura
- Species: P. vazimba

Binomial name
- Paroedura vazimba Nussbaum & Raxworthy, 2000

Species of lizard

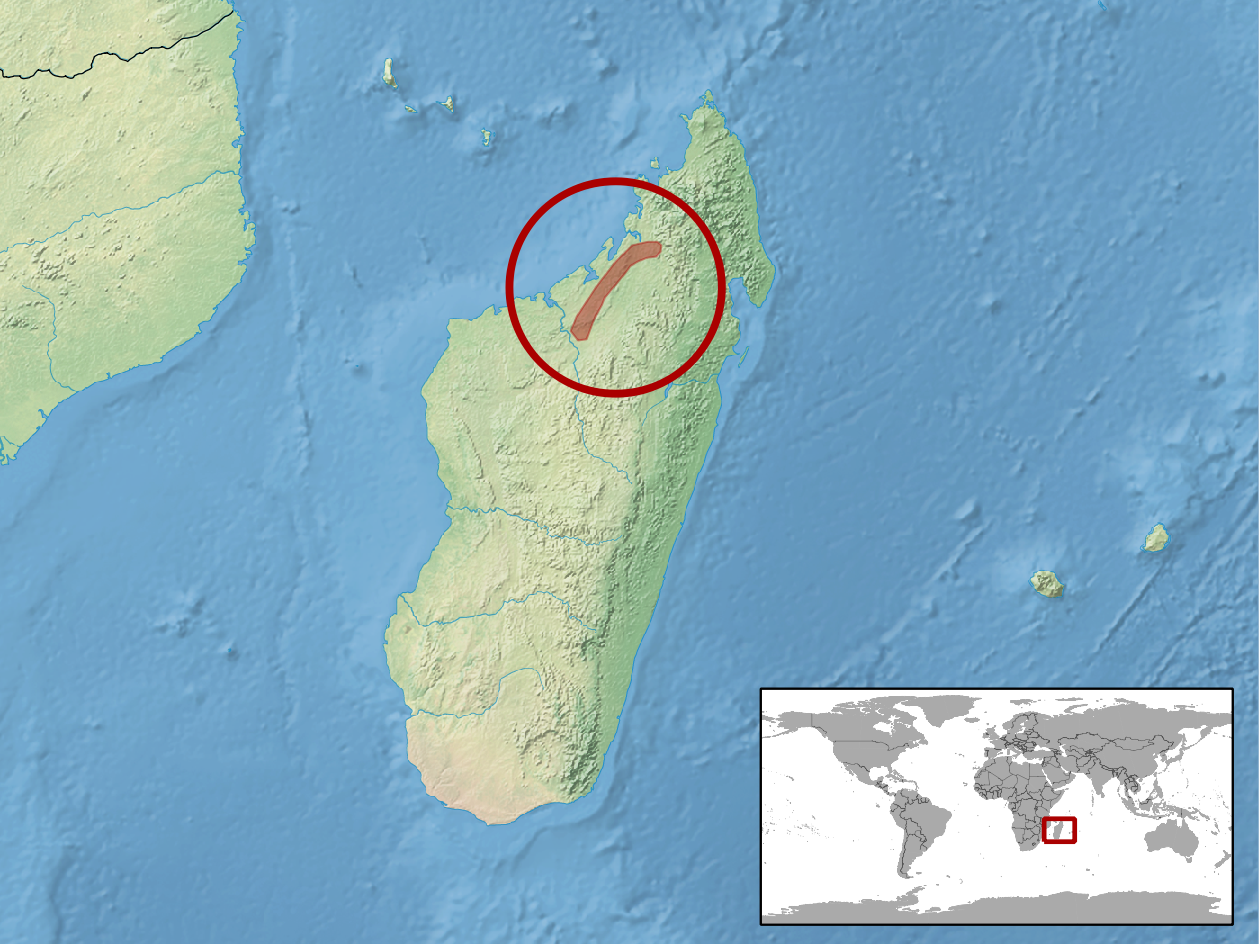
Geographic distribution of Paroedura vazimba.

Paroedura vazimba is a species of lizard in the family Gekkonidae. It is endemic to Madagascar.
