= Trachylepis dumasi =

Conservation status
- Vulnerable (IUCN 3.1)

Scientific classification
- Kingdom: Animalia
- Phylum: Chordata
- Class: Reptilia
- Order: Squamata
- Family: Scincidae
- Genus: Trachylepis
- Species: T. dumasi

Binomial name
- Trachylepis dumasi (Nussbaum & Raxworthy, 1995)
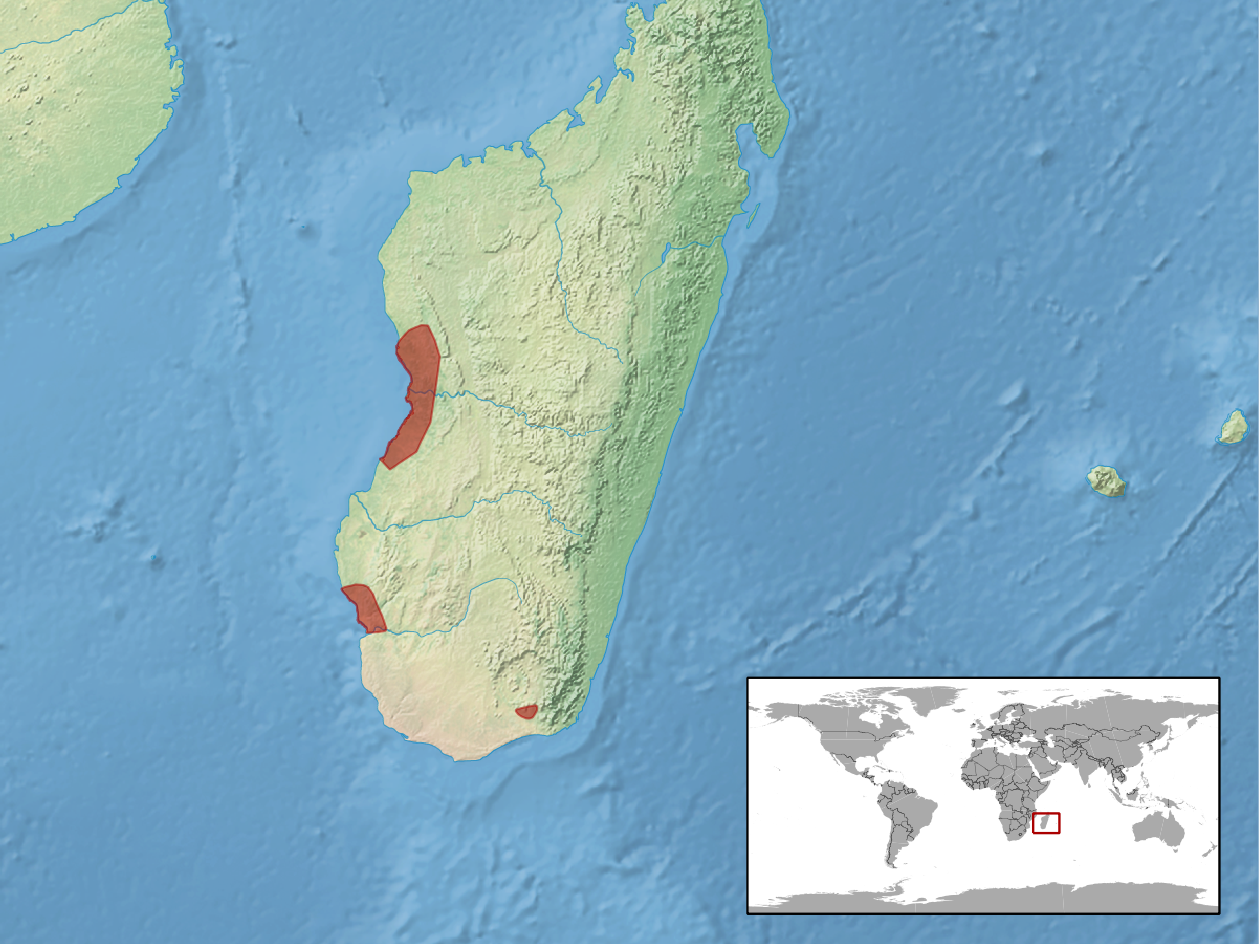

Synonyms
- Mabuya dumasi Nussbaum & Raxworthy, 1955; Euprepis dumasi — Mausfeld & Schmitz, 2003; Trachylepis dumasi — Bauer, 2003

Species of lizard

Trachylepis dumasi is a species of skink, a lizard in the family Scincidae. The species is endemic to Madagascar.

== Etymology ==
The specific name, dumasi, is in honor of American herpetologist Philip Conrad Dumas.

== Habitat ==
The preferred natural habitats of T. dumasi are forest and rocky areas, at altitudes of 100–250 m (330–820 ft).

== Description ==
A relatively small species for its genus, the maximum recorded snout-to-vent length (SVL) of T. dumasi is 5.5 cm (2.2 in). Dorsally, the head, body, and tail are brown.

== Reproduction ==
The mode of reproduction of T. dumasi is unknown.
