= Trachylepis tavaratra =

Conservation status
- Vulnerable (IUCN 3.1)

Scientific classification
- Kingdom: Animalia
- Phylum: Chordata
- Class: Reptilia
- Order: Squamata
- Family: Scincidae
- Genus: Trachylepis
- Species: T. tavaratra

Binomial name
- Trachylepis tavaratra (Ramanamanjato, Nussbaum, & Raxworthy, 1999)
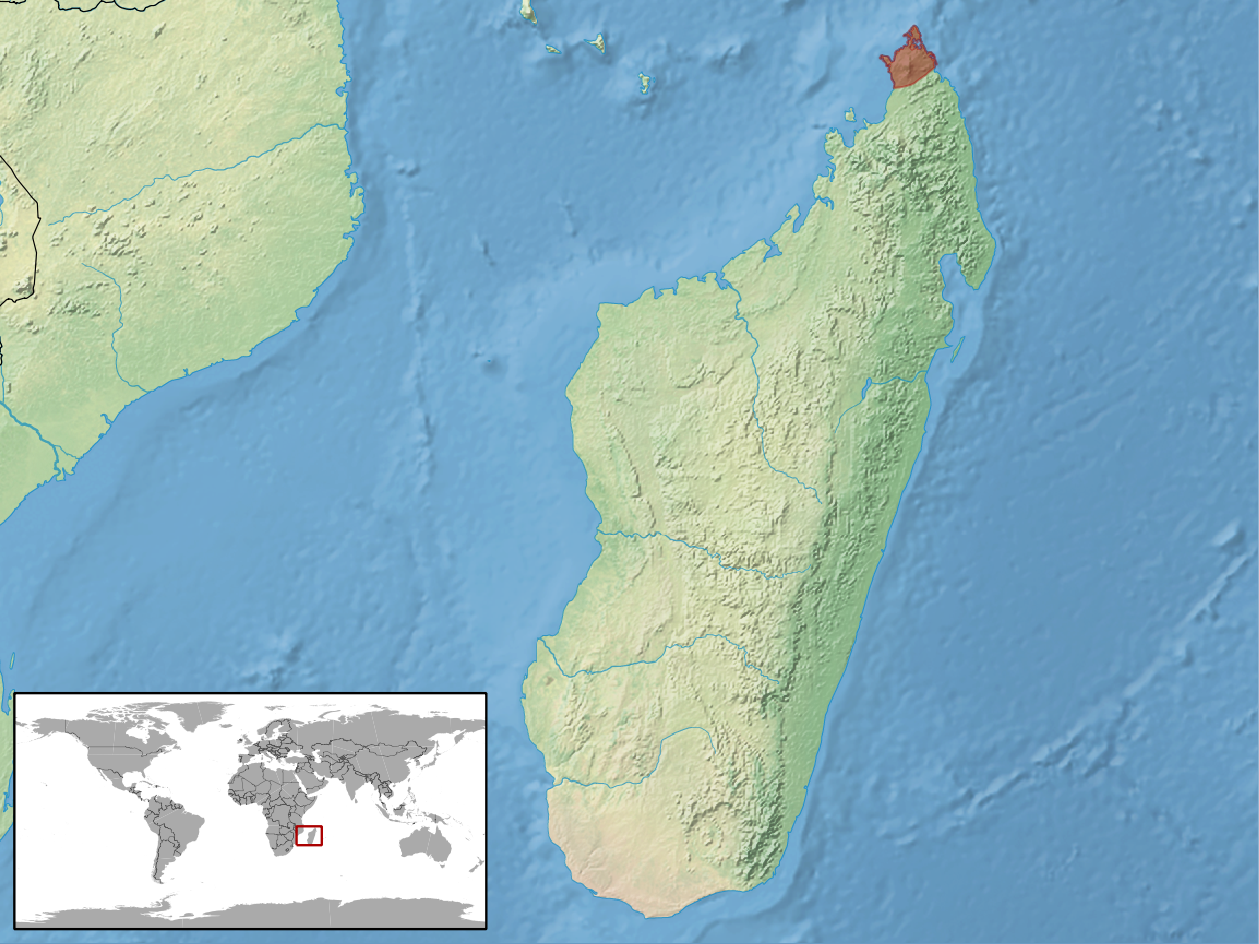

Species of lizard

Trachylepis tavaratra is a species of skink, a lizard in the family Scincidae.

The species is endemic to Madagascar.
