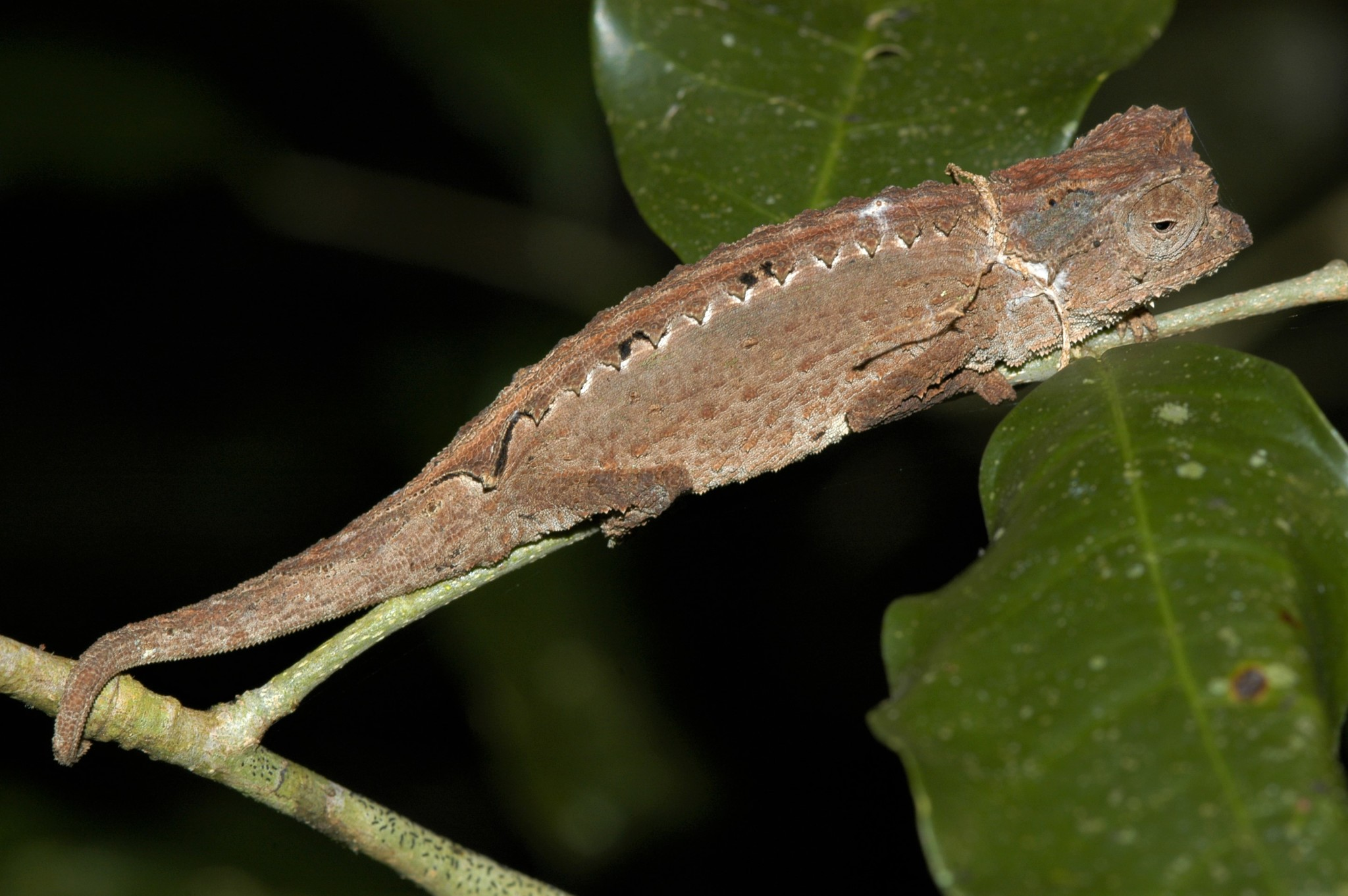

Conservation status
- Near Threatened (IUCN 3.1)

Scientific classification
- Kingdom: Animalia
- Phylum: Chordata
- Class: Reptilia
- Order: Squamata
- Suborder: Iguania
- Family: Chamaeleonidae
- Genus: Brookesia
- Species: B. antakarana

Binomial name
- Brookesia antakarana Raxworthy & Nussbaum, 1995
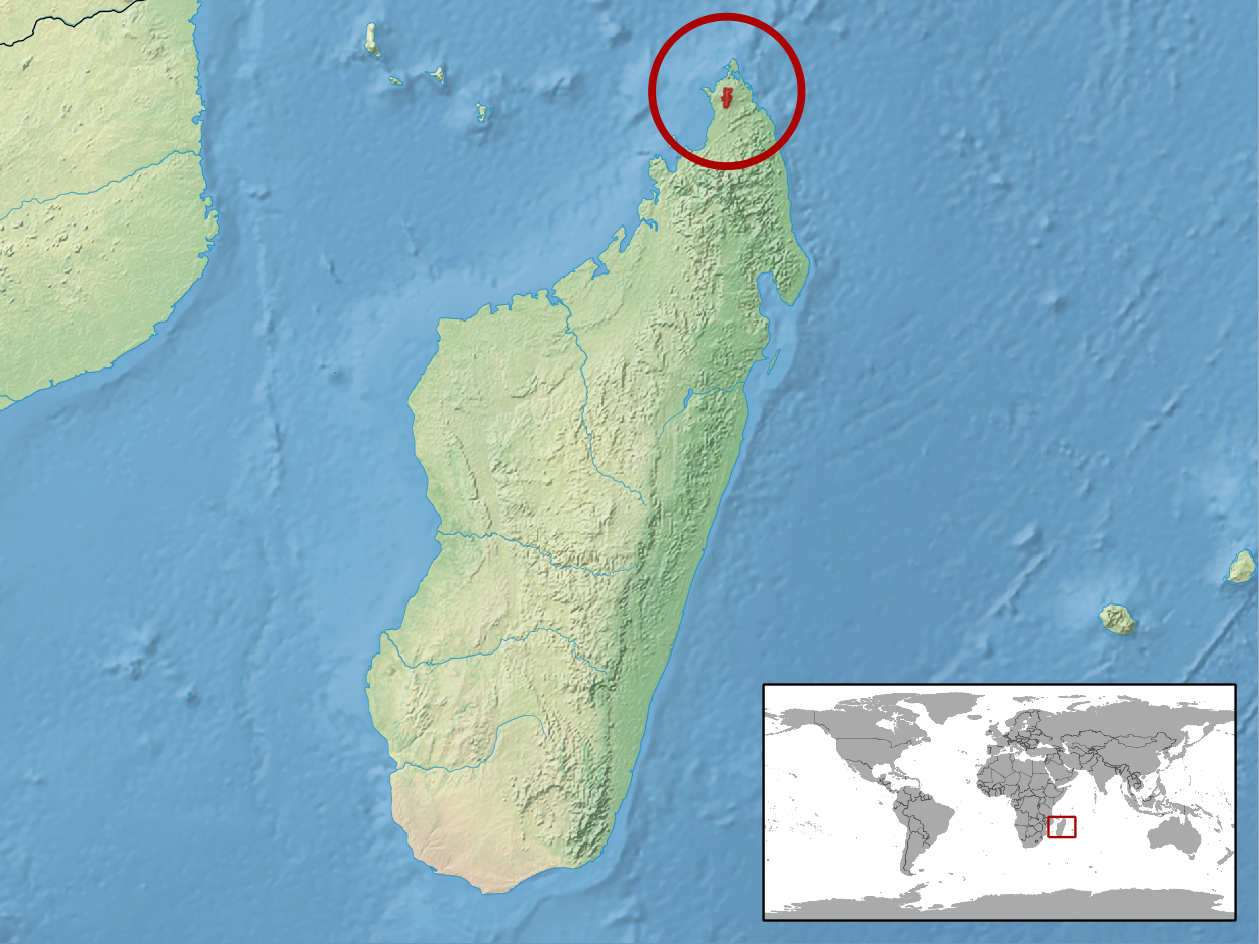

= Antakarana leaf chameleon =

Species of lizard

The Antakarana leaf chameleon, Brookesia antakarana, is a species of chameleon.

It is endemic to Madagascar.
