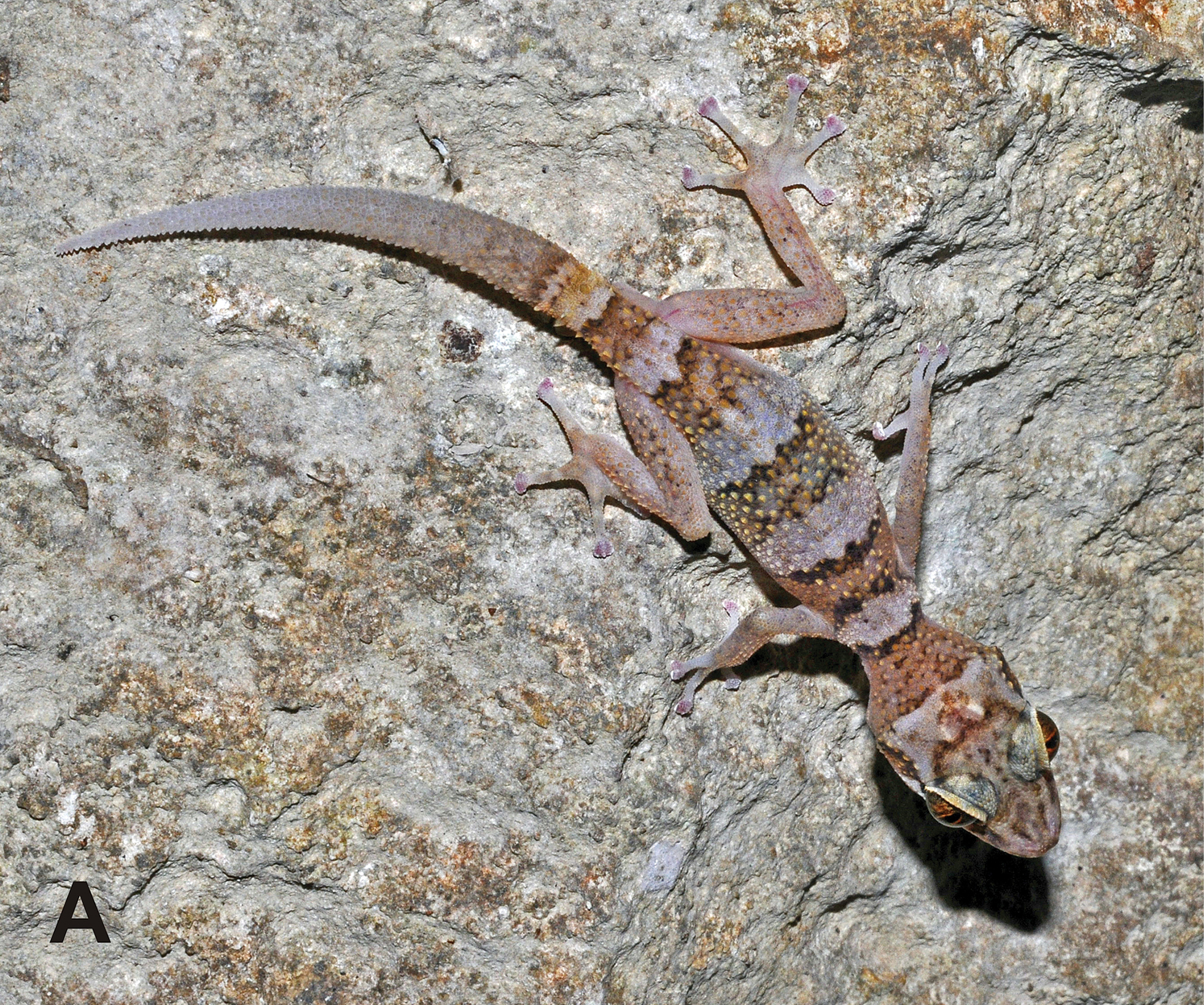

Conservation status
- Least Concern (IUCN 3.1)

Scientific classification
- Kingdom: Animalia
- Phylum: Chordata
- Class: Reptilia
- Order: Squamata
- Suborder: Gekkota
- Family: Gekkonidae
- Genus: Paroedura
- Species: P. karstophila

Binomial name
- Paroedura karstophila Nussbaum & Raxworthy, 2000

= Paroedura karstophila =

Species of lizard

Paroedura karstophila is a species of lizard in the family Gekkonidae. It is described from Montagne des Français, a karstic limestone massif in the far north of Madagascar recently established as nature reserve. The new species has the nostril in contact with the rostral scale and shares many characters with P. karstophila and especially with P. homalorhina which are also restricted to karstic habitats. Paroedura hordiesi differs from P. karstophila by a smoother skin on dorsum and legs, by original and regenerated tails being both entirely smooth, by colouration, and by larger snout-vent length. Morphologically the new species is most similar to P. homalorhina from the Ankarana reserve from which it can be distinguished by shorter limbs and a less slender habitus. Published molecular data place the new species as close relative of P. homalorhina and another undescribed species from Nosy Hara Island, while newly determined data of the cox1 gene for P. karstophila confirm the distinctness of the new species from this taxon. Integrating the information from published and novel molecular data, the new species differs from all nominal Paroedura (except P. vahiny for which no molecular data are available to date) by strong genetic divergences. P. hordiesi might be another microendemic species of the Montagne des Français region. We suggest its IUCN Red List classification as "Critically Endangered" on the basis that it has an extent of occurrence of at most 50 km², it is known from a single location, and there is a continuing decline in the extent and quality of its habitat. It is endemic to Madagascar.
