= Calumma tsycorne =

Conservation status
- Vulnerable (IUCN 3.1)

Scientific classification
- Kingdom: Animalia
- Phylum: Chordata
- Class: Reptilia
- Order: Squamata
- Suborder: Iguania
- Family: Chamaeleonidae
- Genus: Calumma
- Species: C. tsycorne

Binomial name
- Calumma tsycorne Raxworthy & Nussbaum, 2006
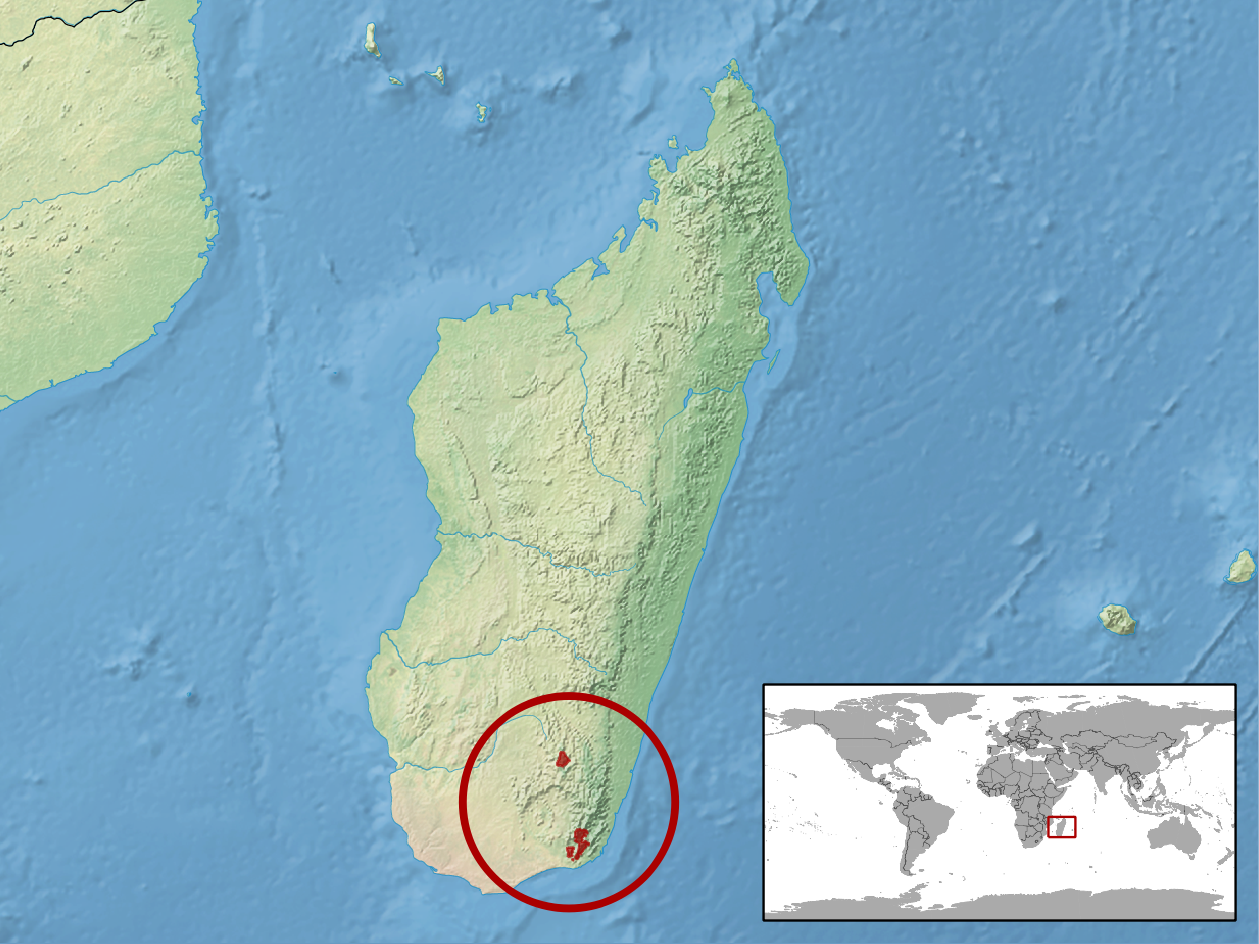

Species of lizard

Calumma tsycorne, the blunt-nosed chameleon, is a species of chameleon found in Madagascar.
