= Ebenavia maintimainty =

Conservation status
- Endangered (IUCN 3.1)

Scientific classification
- Kingdom: Animalia
- Phylum: Chordata
- Class: Reptilia
- Order: Squamata
- Suborder: Gekkota
- Family: Gekkonidae
- Genus: Ebenavia
- Species: E. maintimainty

Binomial name
- Ebenavia maintimainty Nussbaum & Raxworthy, 1998
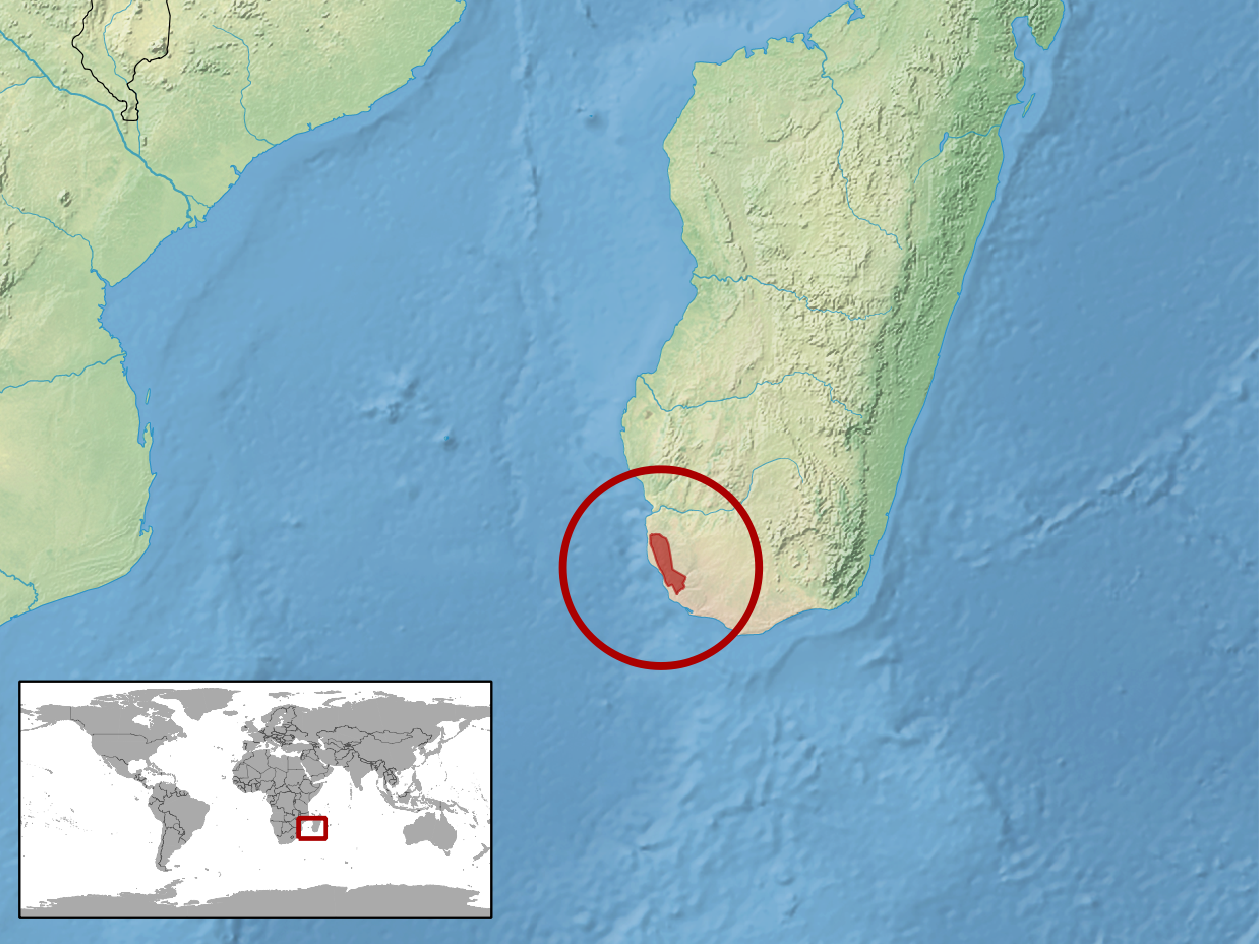
- distribution

Species of lizard

Ebenavia maintimainty is a small nocturnal gecko species of the genus Ebenavia native to Madagascar. It is found in a small area of limestone cliffs east of Lake Tsimanampetsotsa on the Mahafaly Plateau. This habitat forms part of the Madagascar spiny thickets ecoregion.
