= Paragehyra gabriellae =

Conservation status
- Endangered (IUCN 3.1)

Scientific classification
- Kingdom: Animalia
- Phylum: Chordata
- Class: Reptilia
- Order: Squamata
- Suborder: Gekkota
- Family: Gekkonidae
- Genus: Paragehyra
- Species: P. gabriellae

Binomial name
- Paragehyra gabriellae Nussbaum & Raxworthy, 1994

Species of lizard

Paragehyra gabriellae is a species of lizard in the family Gekkonidae. The species is endemic to Madagascar.

== Etymology ==
The specific name, gabriellae, is in honor of Malagasy herpetologist Gabriellà Raharimanana.

== Geographic distribution ==
Paragehyra gabriellae is found in southern Madagascar in the vicinity of the cities Tôlanaro and Toliara.

== Habitat ==
The preferred natural habitat of Paragehyra gabriellae is forest at altitudes of 120–240 m (390–790 ft).

== Behavior ==
Paragehyra gabriellae is terrestrial and nocturnal.

== Reproduction ==
Paragehyra gabriellae is oviparous. A clutch of two eggs is laid in October through December in a communal site.
