= Calumma peltierorum =

Conservation status
- Near Threatened (IUCN 3.1)

Scientific classification
- Kingdom: Animalia
- Phylum: Chordata
- Class: Reptilia
- Order: Squamata
- Suborder: Iguania
- Family: Chamaeleonidae
- Genus: Calumma
- Species: C. peltierorum

Binomial name
- Calumma peltierorum Raxworthy & Nussbaum, 2006
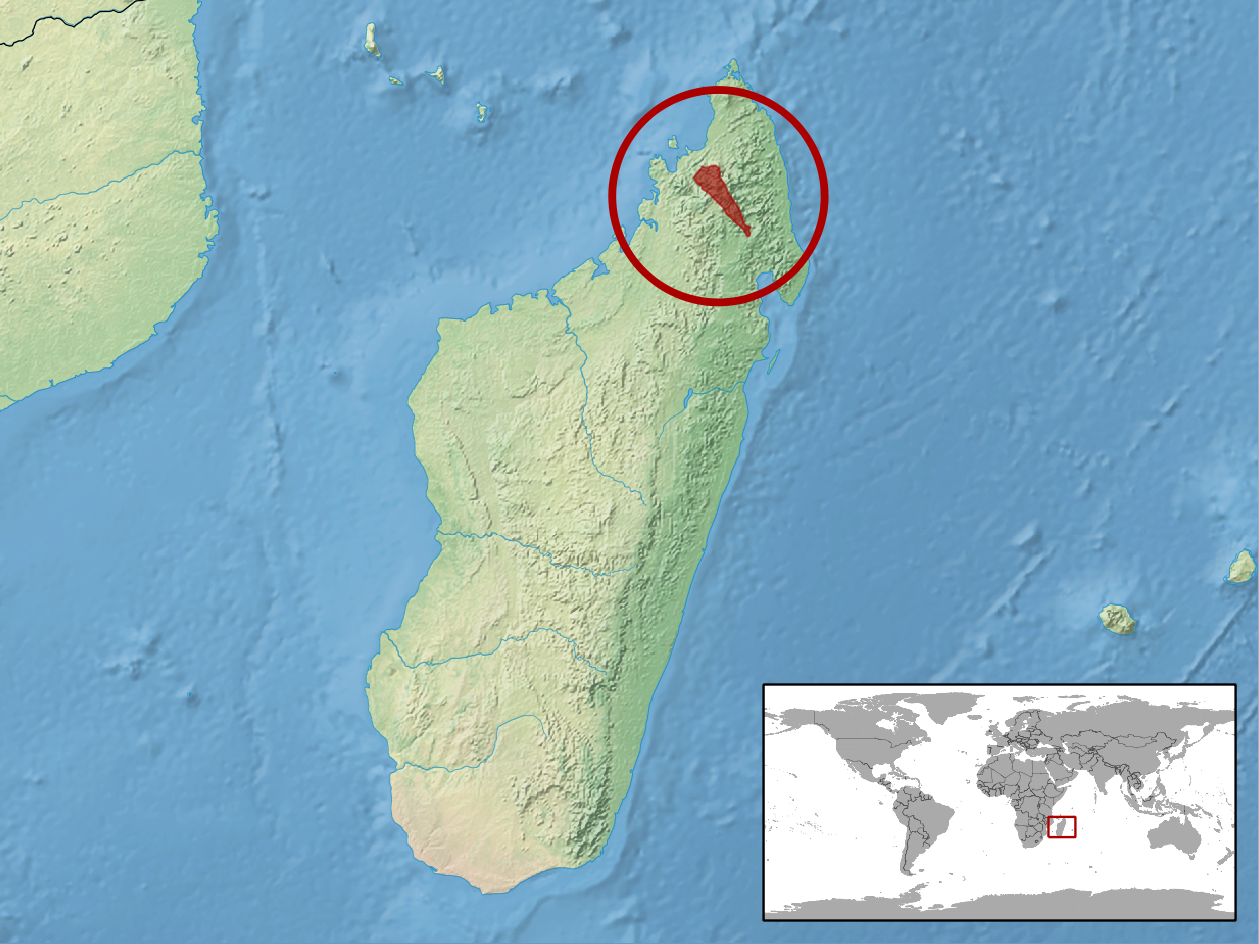

Species of lizard

Calumma peltierorum, also known commonly as Peltier's chameleon, is a species of lizard in the family Chamaeleonidae. The species is endemic to Madagascar.

== Etymology ==
The specific name, peltierorum (Latin, genitive, plural), is in honor of Jeffrey and Valerie Peltier, whose family trust has supported herpetological research and conservation efforts of the American Museum of Natural History.

== Description ==
Calumma peltierorum has large occipital lobes and 14–19 gular spines. Its color varies depending on many factors, although it usually has hues of green and brown. The male has a single ossified rostral appendage.

== Geographic distribution ==
Calumma peltierorum is found in northern Madagascar, in Diana Region and Sava Region.

== Habitat ==
The preferred natural habitat of Calumma peltierorum is montane humid forest, at elevations of 1,700–2,580 m (5,580–8,460 ft).

== Reproduction ==
Calumma peltierorum is oviparous.

== Sympatry ==
Calumma peltierorum is sympatric with Calumma malthe.
