= Bizarre-nosed chameleon =

Conservation status
- Critically Endangered (IUCN 3.1)

Scientific classification
- Kingdom: Animalia
- Phylum: Chordata
- Class: Reptilia
- Order: Squamata
- Suborder: Iguania
- Family: Chamaeleonidae
- Genus: Calumma
- Species: C. hafahafa

Binomial name
- Calumma hafahafa Raxworthy & Nussbaum, 2006
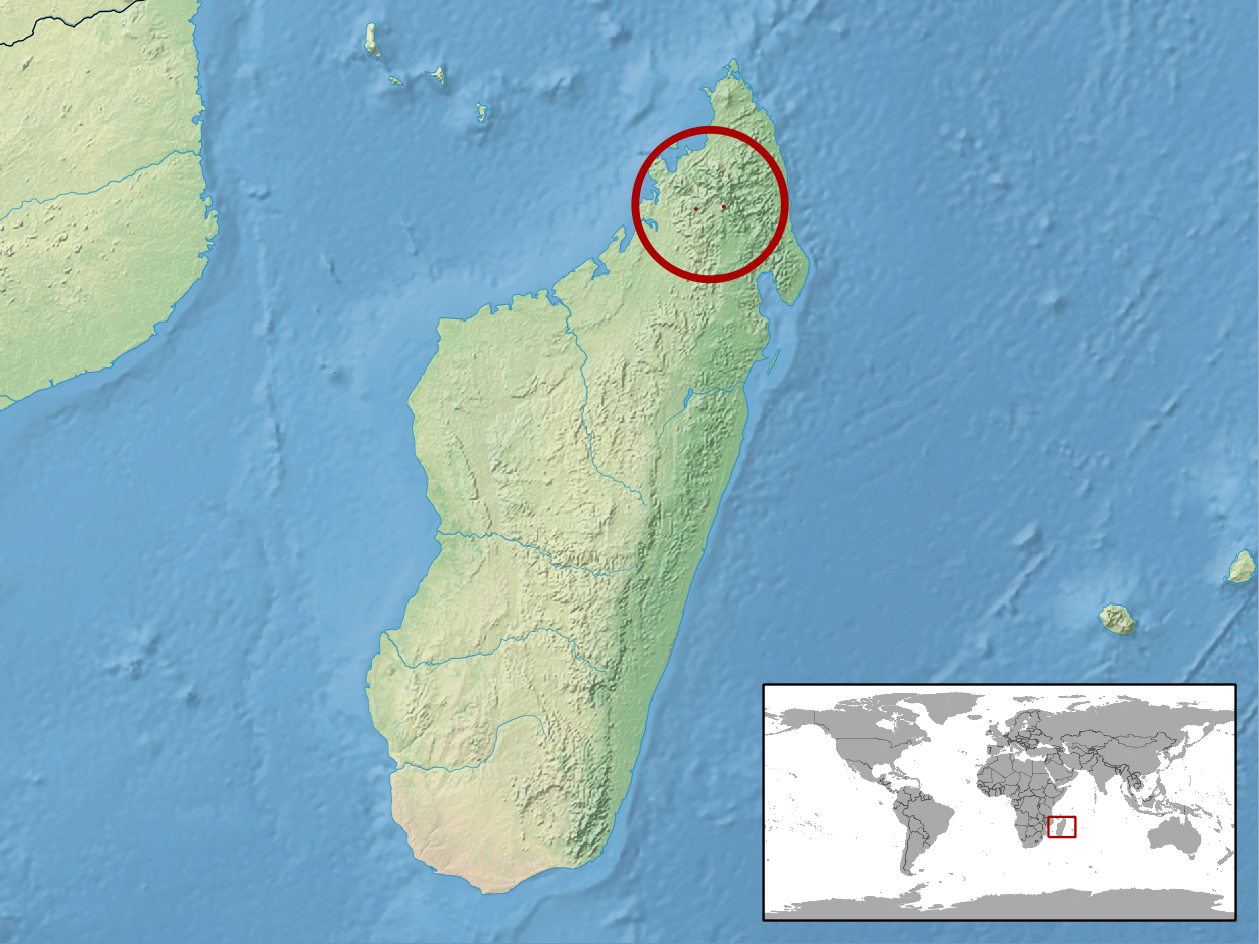
- Range of bizarre-nosed chameleon

Species of lizard

The bizarre-nosed chameleon (Calumma hafahafa) is a species of chameleon endemic to Madagascar. Its scientific name was named after the Malagasy word hafahafa, which means "bizarre" or "strange" (a reference to the species' unusually upturned rostral appendages).

== Distribution and habitat ==
Although the true extent of the bizarre-nosed chameleon's range is not known, it is estimated to less than 100 square kilometers. Specimens have been taken from several locations in northeastern Madagascar, all at relatively high altitude. It appears the species lives only in montane humid forests.

== Description ==
The primary distinguishing characteristic of the bizarre-nosed chameleon is the single large rostral ("nose") appendage appearing on the males. Otherwise it is quite similar to Calumma malthe and Calumma peltieriorum. It has around 18 gular spines as well.

== Conservation and threats ==
Mostly due to its extremely small range and ongoing habitat loss, the bizarre-nosed chameleon is ranked as critically endangered by the International Union for Conservation of Nature. Its population is probably declining, and conservation action is necessary to prevent extinction.
