= Madascincus minutus =

Scientific classification
- Kingdom: Animalia
- Phylum: Chordata
- Class: Reptilia
- Order: Squamata
- Family: Scincidae
- Genus: Madascincus
- Species: M. minutus

Binomial name
- Madascincus minutus Raxworthy & Nussbaum, 1993)
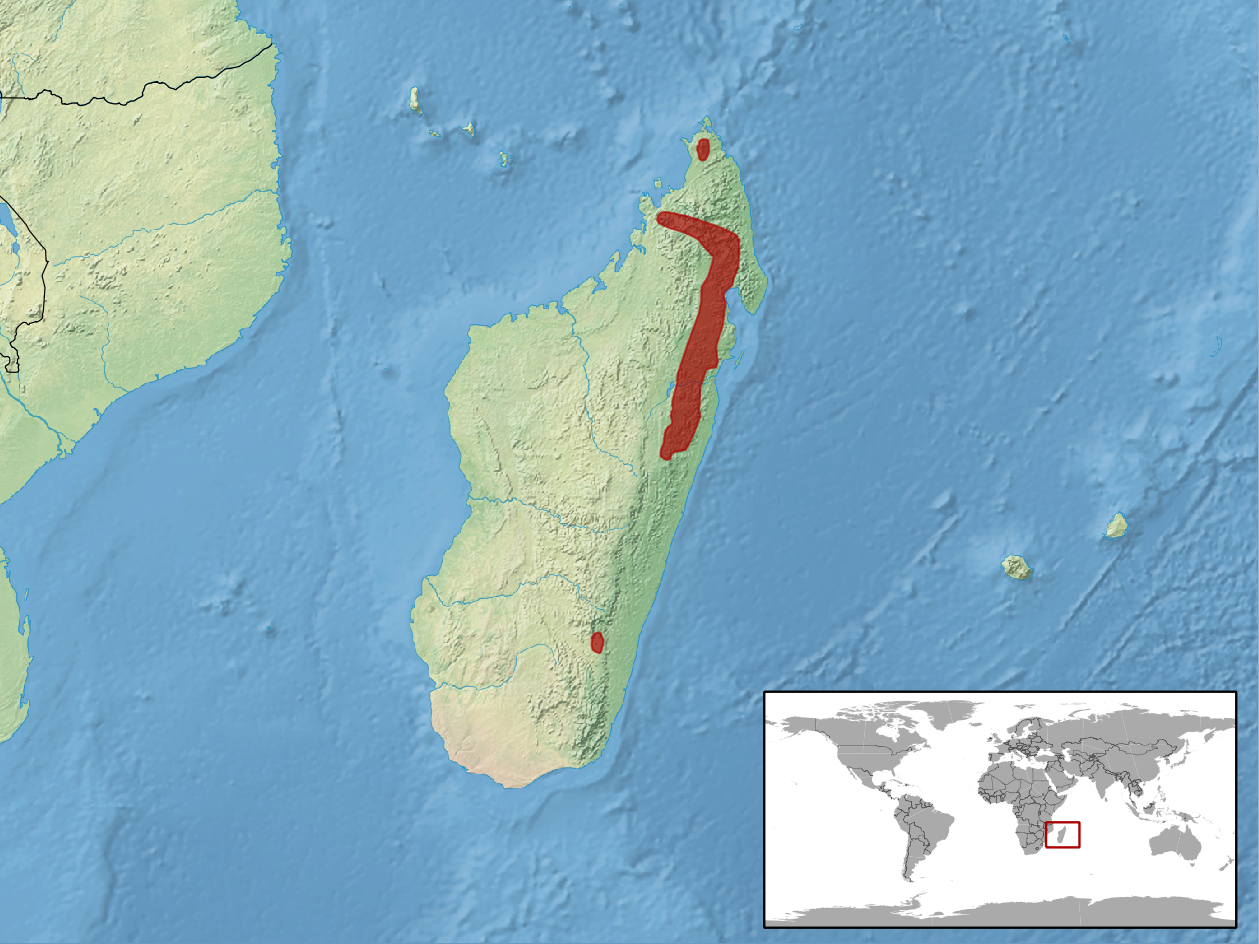

Species of reptile

Madascincus minutus is an extant species of skink, a lizard in the family Scincidae. The species is endemic to Madagascar.
