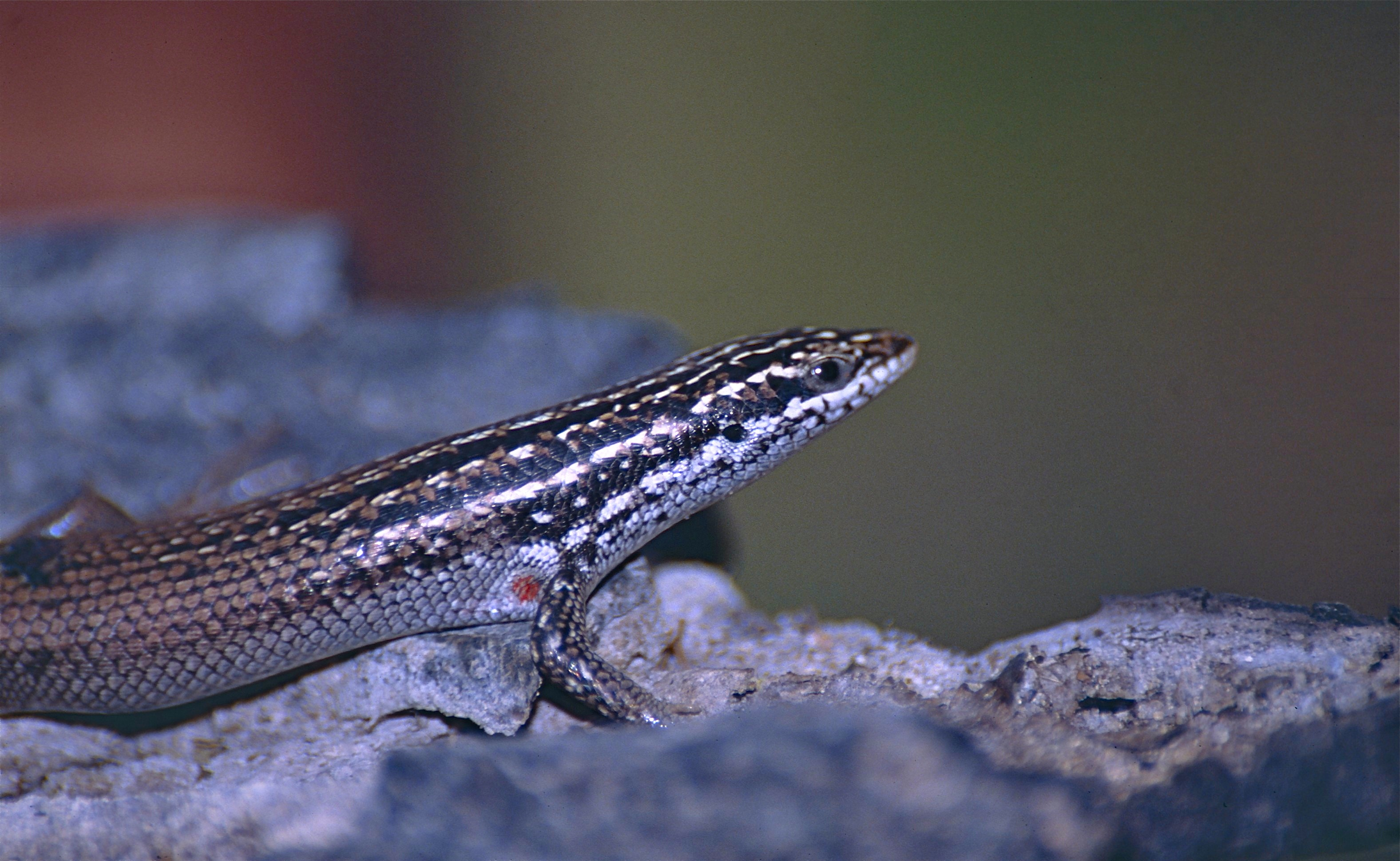

Conservation status
- Near Threatened (IUCN 3.1)

Scientific classification
- Kingdom: Animalia
- Phylum: Chordata
- Class: Reptilia
- Order: Squamata
- Family: Scincidae
- Genus: Trachylepis
- Species: T. nancycoutuae

Binomial name
- Trachylepis nancycoutuae (Nussbaum & Raxworthy, 1998)
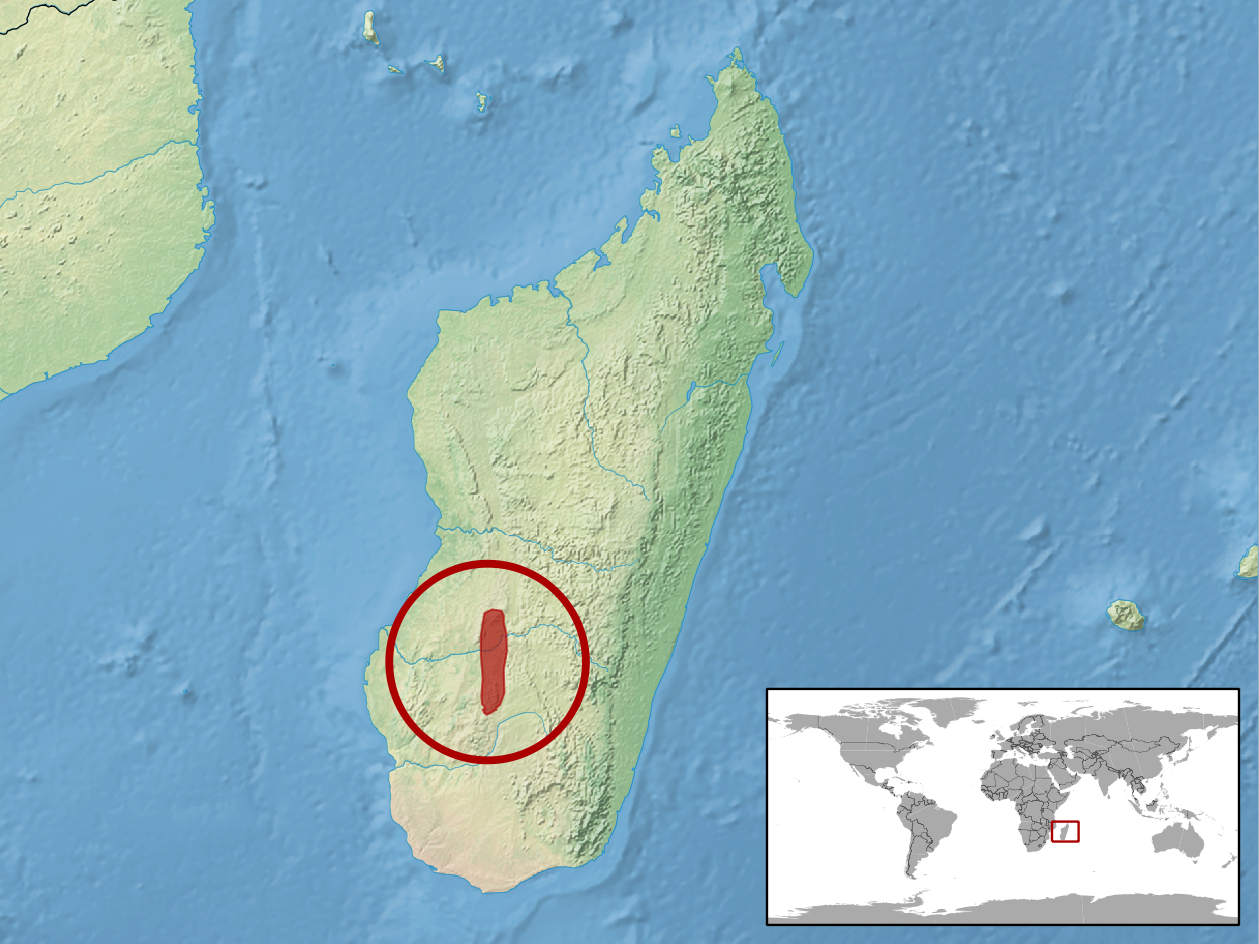

Synonyms
- Mabuya nancycoutuae Nussbaum & Raxworthy, 1998; Euprepis nancycoutuae — Mausfeld & Schmitz, 2003; Trachylepis nancycoutuae — Bauer, 2003

= Trachylepis nancycoutuae =

Species of lizard

Trachylepis nancycoutuae, also known commonly as Nancy Coutu's mabuya and Nancy Coutu's skink, is a species of lizard in the subfamily Lygosominae of the family Scincidae. The species is endemic to Madagascar.

== Etymology ==
The specific name, nancycoutuae, is in honor of American Peace Corps volunteer Nancy Coutu (1967–1996), who was murdered in Madagascar by cattle thieves.

== Habitat ==
The preferred natural habitats of Trachylepis nancycoutuae are rocky areas and shrubland, at altitudes of 700–750 m (2,300–2,460 ft).

== Reproduction ==
The mode of reproduction of Trachylepis nancycoutuae is unknown.
