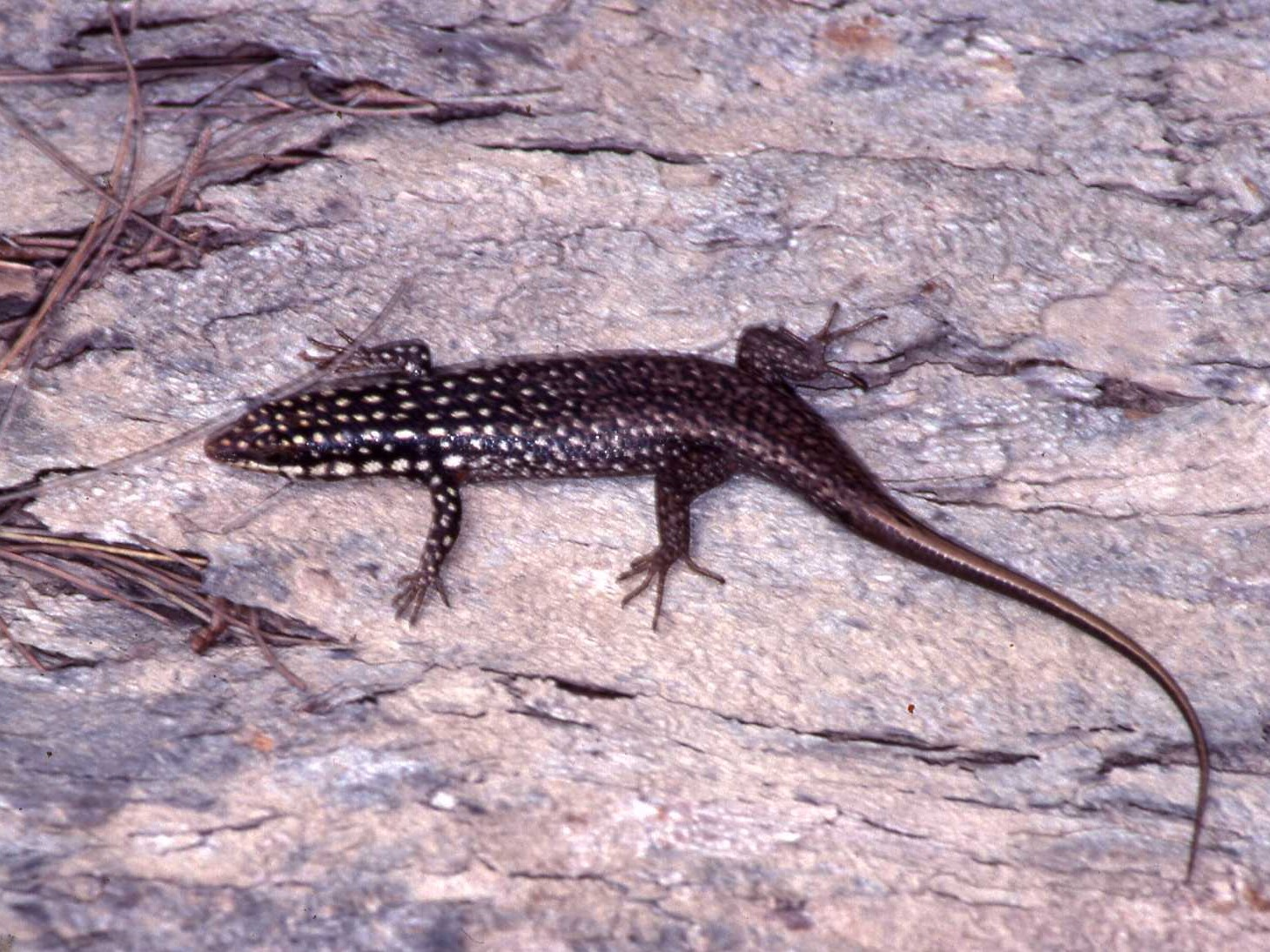

Conservation status
- Data Deficient (IUCN 3.1)

Scientific classification
- Kingdom: Animalia
- Phylum: Chordata
- Class: Reptilia
- Order: Squamata
- Family: Scincidae
- Genus: Trachylepis
- Species: T. vezo

Binomial name
- Trachylepis vezo (Ramanamanjato, Nussbaum, & Raxworthy, 1999)
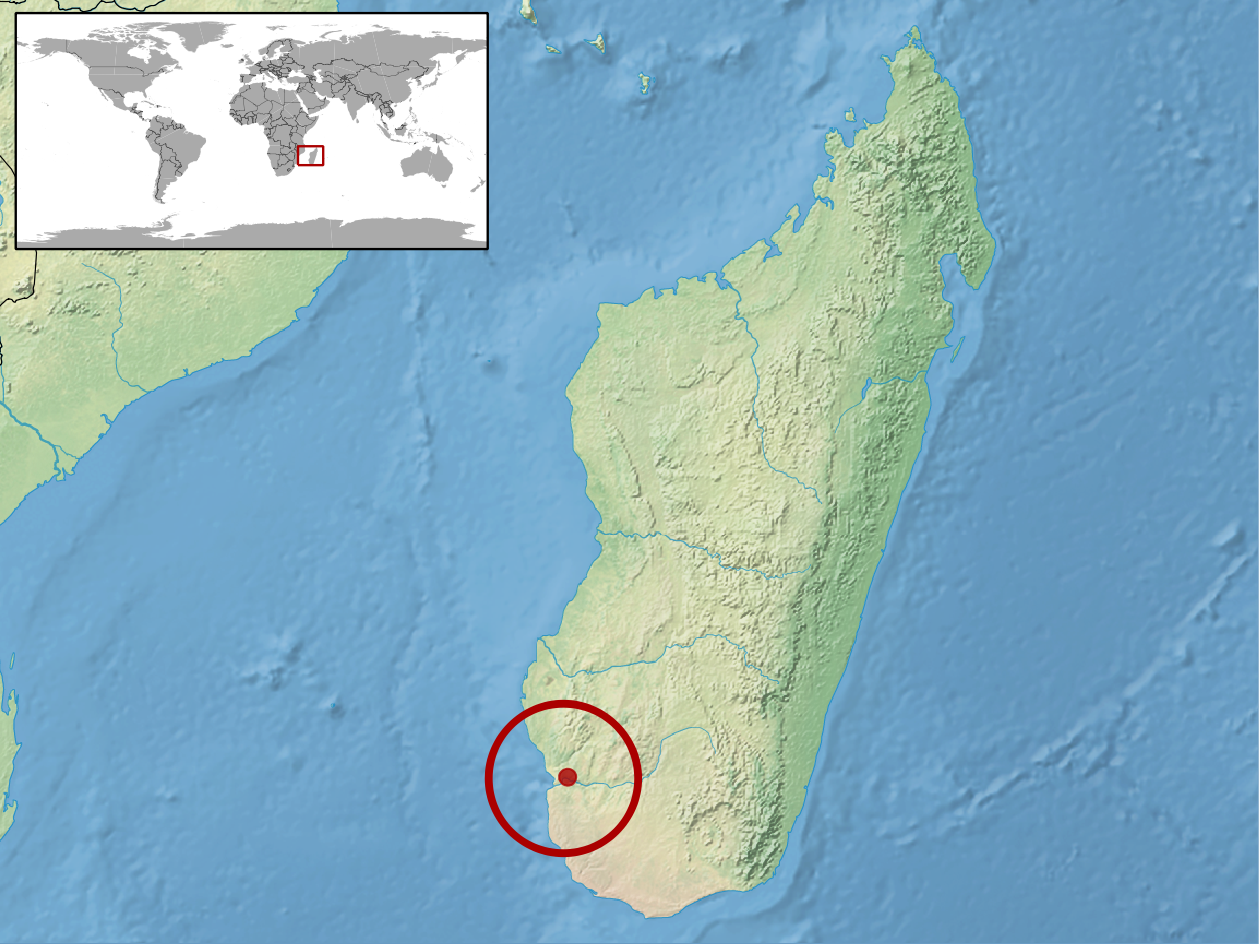

= Trachylepis vezo =

Species of lizard

Trachylepis vezo is a species of skink, a lizard in the family Scincidae.

The species is endemic to Madagascar.
