= Trachylepis lavarambo =

Conservation status
- Vulnerable (IUCN 3.1)

Scientific classification
- Kingdom: Animalia
- Phylum: Chordata
- Class: Reptilia
- Order: Squamata
- Suborder: Scinciformata
- Infraorder: Scincomorpha
- Family: Mabuyidae
- Genus: Trachylepis
- Species: T. lavarambo

Binomial name
- Trachylepis lavarambo (Nussbaum & Raxworthy, 1998)
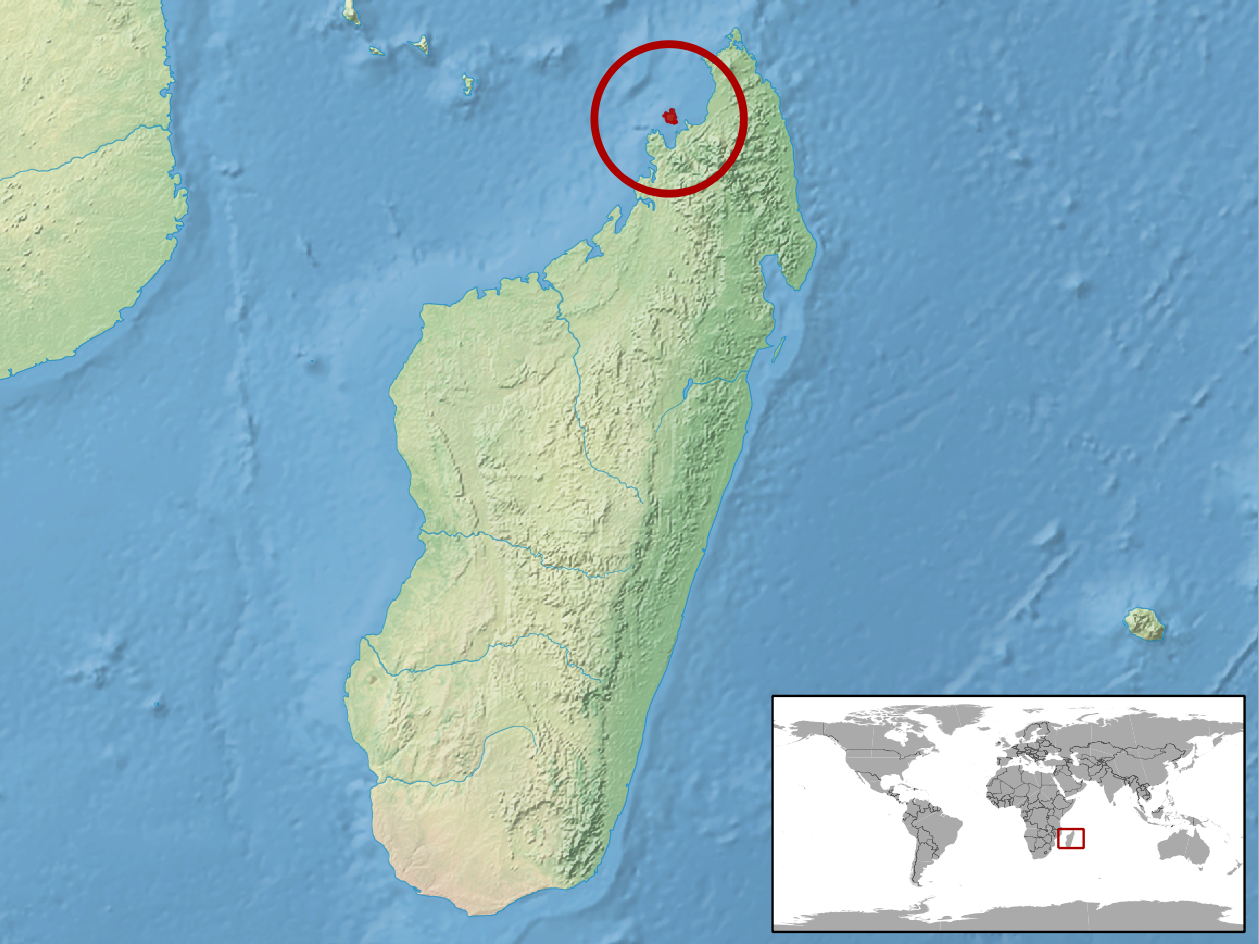

Species of lizard

Trachylepis lavarambo is a species of skink found in Madagascar.
