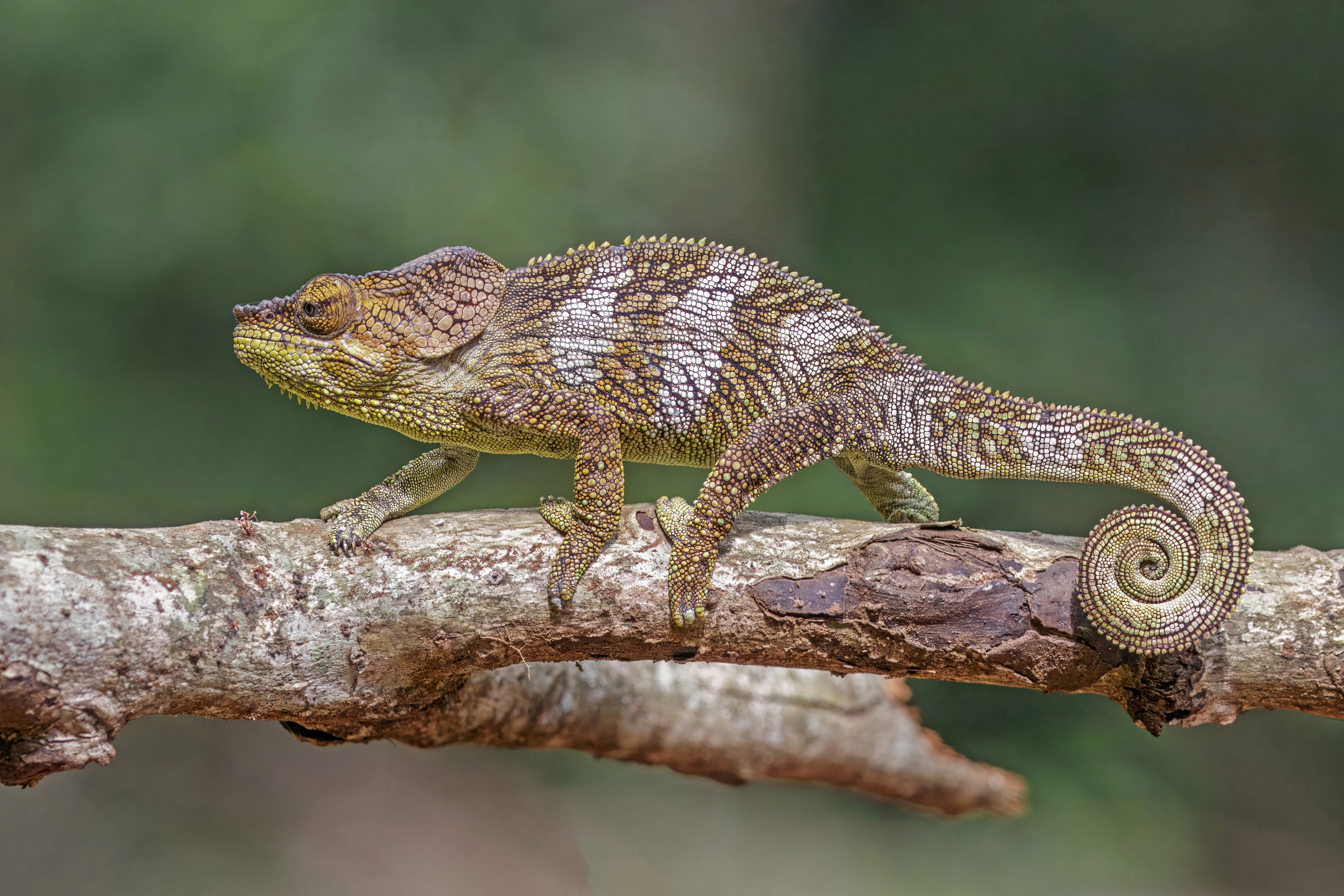
- male, Montagne d'Ambre National Park

Conservation status
- Near Threatened (IUCN 3.1)

Scientific classification
- Kingdom: Animalia
- Phylum: Chordata
- Class: Reptilia
- Order: Squamata
- Suborder: Iguania
- Family: Chamaeleonidae
- Genus: Calumma
- Species: C. amber

Binomial name
- Calumma amber Raxworthy & Nussbaum, 2006
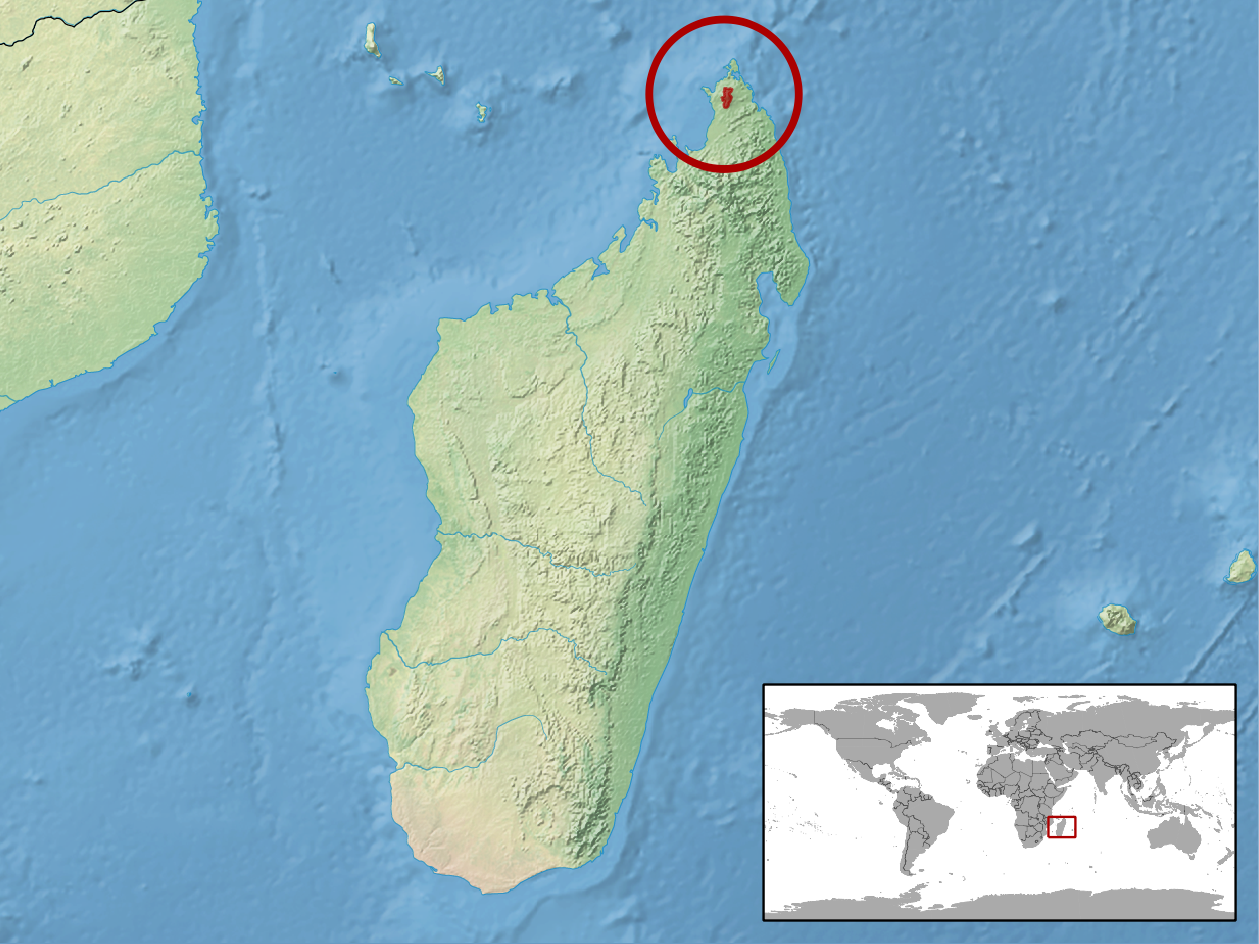

= Calumma amber =

Species of lizard

Calumma amber, commonly known as the Amber Mountain chameleon, is a species of chameleons endemic to Antsiranana Province, Madagascar. The species was first observed in 1989 and was first described in 2006, and can only be found in the northernmost portion of the northern Diana Region of Madagascar, on and around Montagne d'Amber National Park. C. amber was originally considered to be a population of C. brevicorne.
