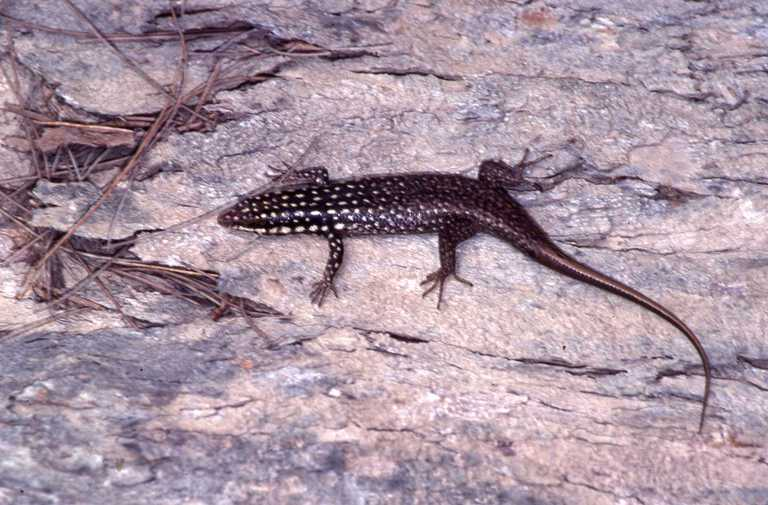

Conservation status
- Least Concern (IUCN 3.1)

Scientific classification
- Kingdom: Animalia
- Phylum: Chordata
- Class: Reptilia
- Order: Squamata
- Suborder: Scinciformata
- Infraorder: Scincomorpha
- Family: Mabuyidae
- Genus: Trachylepis
- Species: T. vato

Binomial name
- Trachylepis vato (Nussbaum & Raxworthy, 1994)
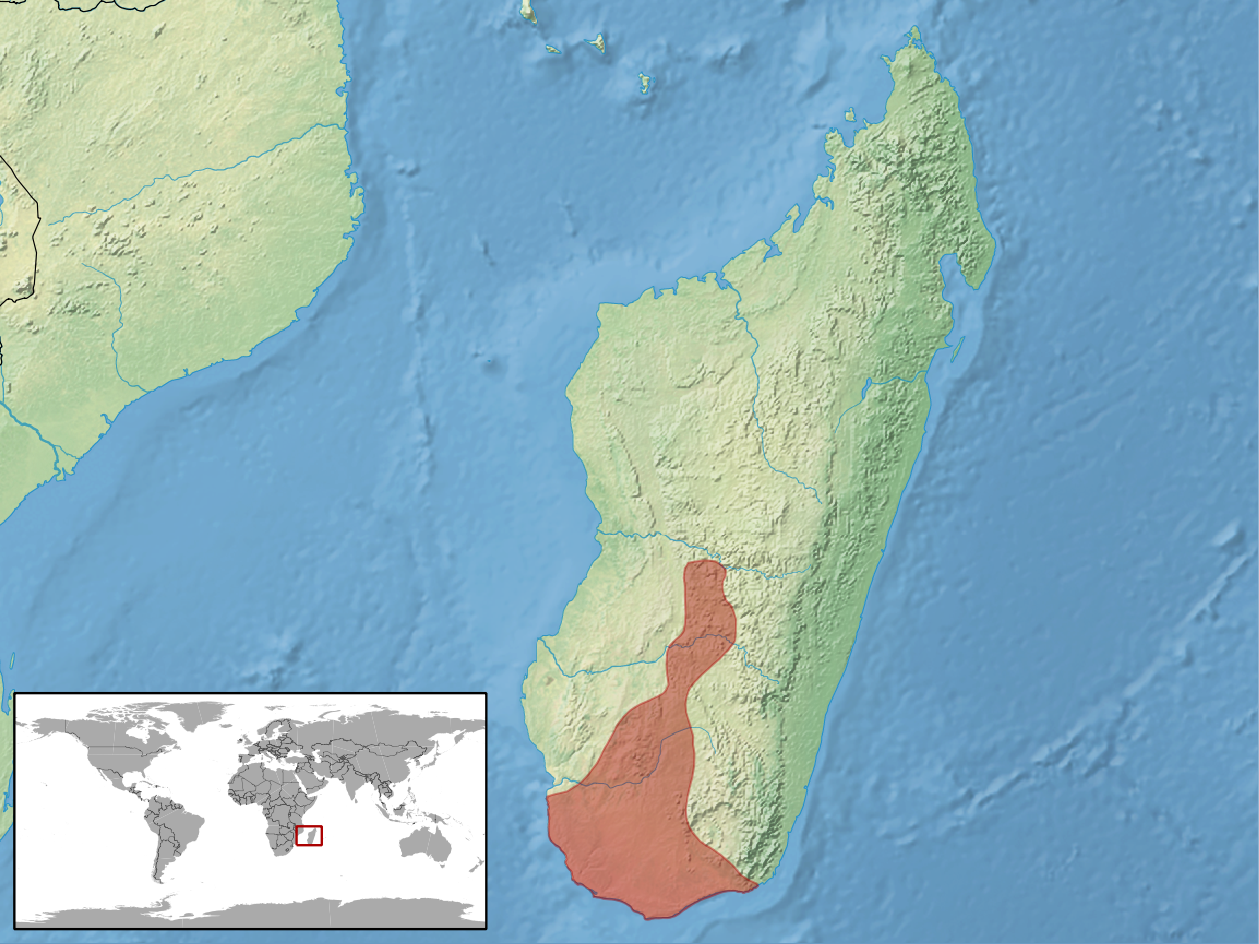

= Trachylepis vato =

Species of lizard

The boulder mabuya (Trachylepis vato) is a species of skink found in Madagascar.
