= Flexiseps mandokava =

Conservation status
- Vulnerable (IUCN 3.1)

Scientific classification
- Domain: Eukaryota
- Kingdom: Animalia
- Phylum: Chordata
- Class: Reptilia
- Order: Squamata
- Family: Scincidae
- Genus: Flexiseps
- Species: F. mandokava

Binomial name
- Flexiseps mandokava Raxworthy & Nussbaum, 1993

Synonyms
- Amphiglossus mandokava

Species of lizard

Flexiseps mandokava is a species of skink endemic to Madagascar.
