= Christopher John Raxworthy =

- Born: February 5, 1964 (age 62); England
- Education: Royal Holloway, University of London; The Open University
- Known for: Herpetological research on Madagascar
- Scientific career
- Fields: Herpetology
- Workplaces: American Museum of Natural History

Christopher John Raxworthy (born 5 February 1964) is an English herpetologist and curator at the American Museum of Natural History in New York City.

== Biography ==
Christopher John Raxworthy studied at the University of London (Royal Holloway and Bedford New College). He received his bachelor's degree in 1985 and his doctorate from The Open University in 1989. In 1996, he became an assistant professor at the University of Kansas, and from 1998 to 2000 he worked at Columbia University. In 2000, he became an associate professor and curator at the American Museum of Natural History.

He specializes in the study of the herpetofauna of Madagascar, particularly geckos and chameleons. As part of his field research, he has worked in Vietnam, Ghana, and Mali. He works on the application of geographic information systems and satellite data to species conservation and ecological questions. In 2010, he had been credited with describing 50 species of reptiles.

== Described taxa ==
Raxworthy has particularly studied the fauna of Madagascar, especially its herpetological fauna. He has described a number of taxa in collaboration with other researchers.

- With Ronald Archie Nussbaum:
  - Amphiglossus anosyensis, Amphiglossus mandokava and Amphiglossus punctatus, 1993.
  - Madascincus minutus, 1993.
  - Paroedura masobe, 1994.
  - Trachylepis vato, 1994.
  - Paragehyra gabriellae, 1994.
  - Brookesia ambreensis, Brookesia antakarana, Brookesia bekolosy, Brookesia brygooi, Brookesia lineata and Brookesia lolontany, 1995.
  - Trachylepis dumasi, 1995.
  - Ebenavia maintimainty, 1998.
  - Trachylepis lavarambo and Trachylepis nancycoutuae, 1998.
  - Paroedura karstophila, Paroedura maingoka, Paroedura tanjaka and Paroedura vazimba, 2000.
  - Zonosaurus anelanelany, Zonosaurus bemaraha and Zonosaurus tsingy, 2000.
  - Heteroliodon lava, 2000.
  - Calumma amber, Calumma crypticum, Calumma hafahafa, Calumma jejy, Calumma peltierorum and Calumma tsycorne, 2006.
- With Nussbaum and Jean-Baptiste Ramanamanjato: Trachylepis tandrefana, Trachylepis tavaratra and Trachylepis vezo, 1999.
- With Steven M. Goodman, C. P. Maminirina and Link E. Olson: Microgale jobihely, 2006.

== Selected publications ==
- "Reptiles, rainforest and conservation in Madagascar". Biological Conservation. 43 (3): 181–211. 1988.
- A review of the Madagascar snake genera Pseudoxyrhopus, Pararhadinaea, and Heteroliodon (Squamata: Colubridae). Ann Arbor: Museum of Zoology, University of Michigan. 1994.
- Systematic revision of the genus Paroedura Günther (Reptilia: Squamata: Gekkonidae): with the description of five new species. Ann Arbor: Museum of Zoology, University of Michigan. 2000.
- With Paulina D. Jenkins and Steven M. Goodman: "The Shrew Tenrecs (Microgale) (Insectivora: Tenrecidae) of the Réserve Naturelle Intégrale d'Andringitra, Madagascar". Fieldiana Zoology. 85: 191–217. 1996.
