= Brachyseps punctatus =

Conservation status
- Least Concern (IUCN 3.1)

Scientific classification
- Domain: Eukaryota
- Kingdom: Animalia
- Phylum: Chordata
- Class: Reptilia
- Order: Squamata
- Family: Scincidae
- Genus: Brachyseps
- Species: B. punctatus

Binomial name
- Brachyseps punctatus Raxworthy & Nussbaum, 1993
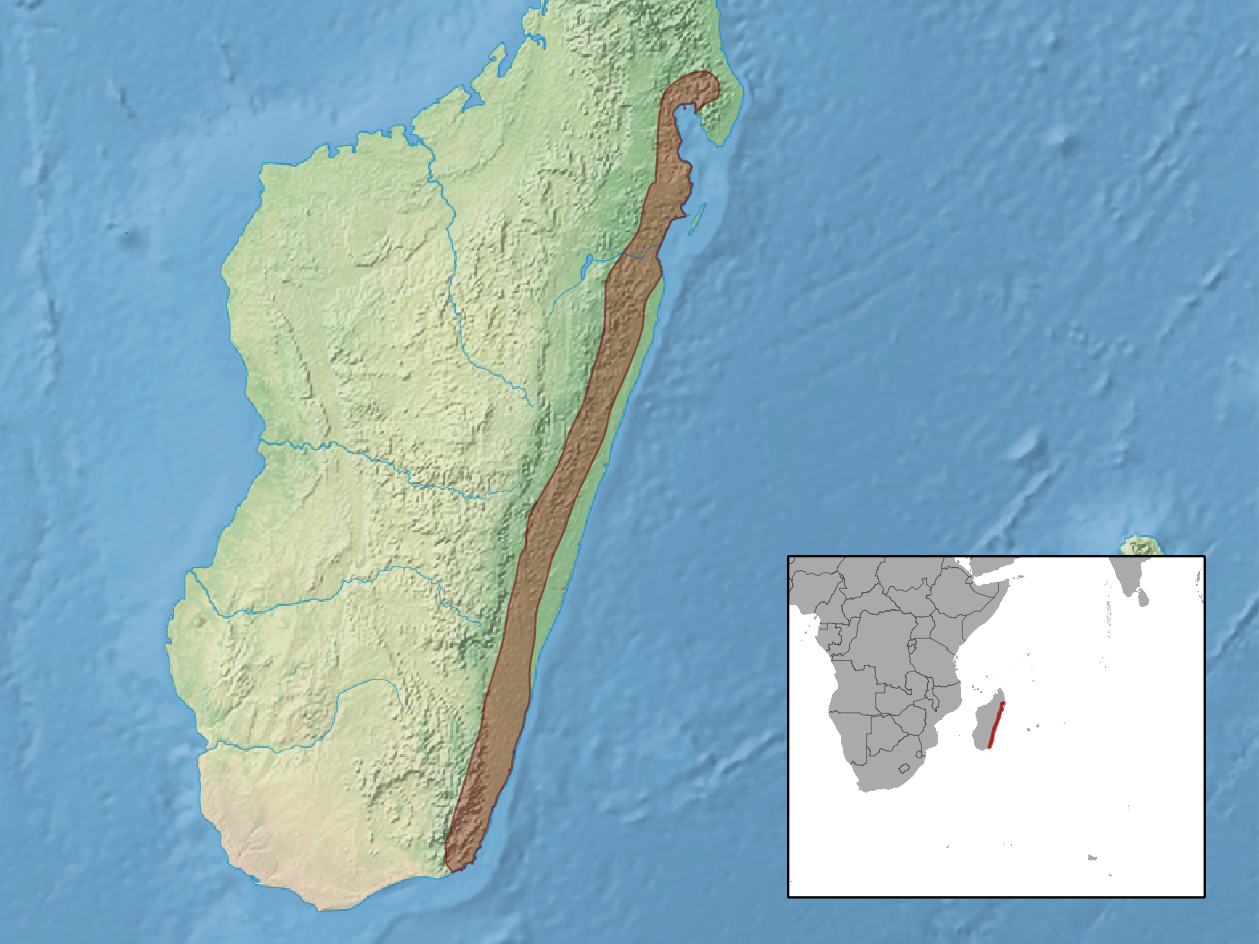

Synonyms
- Amphiglossus punctatus

Species of lizard

Brachyseps punctatus is a species of skink endemic to Madagascar.
