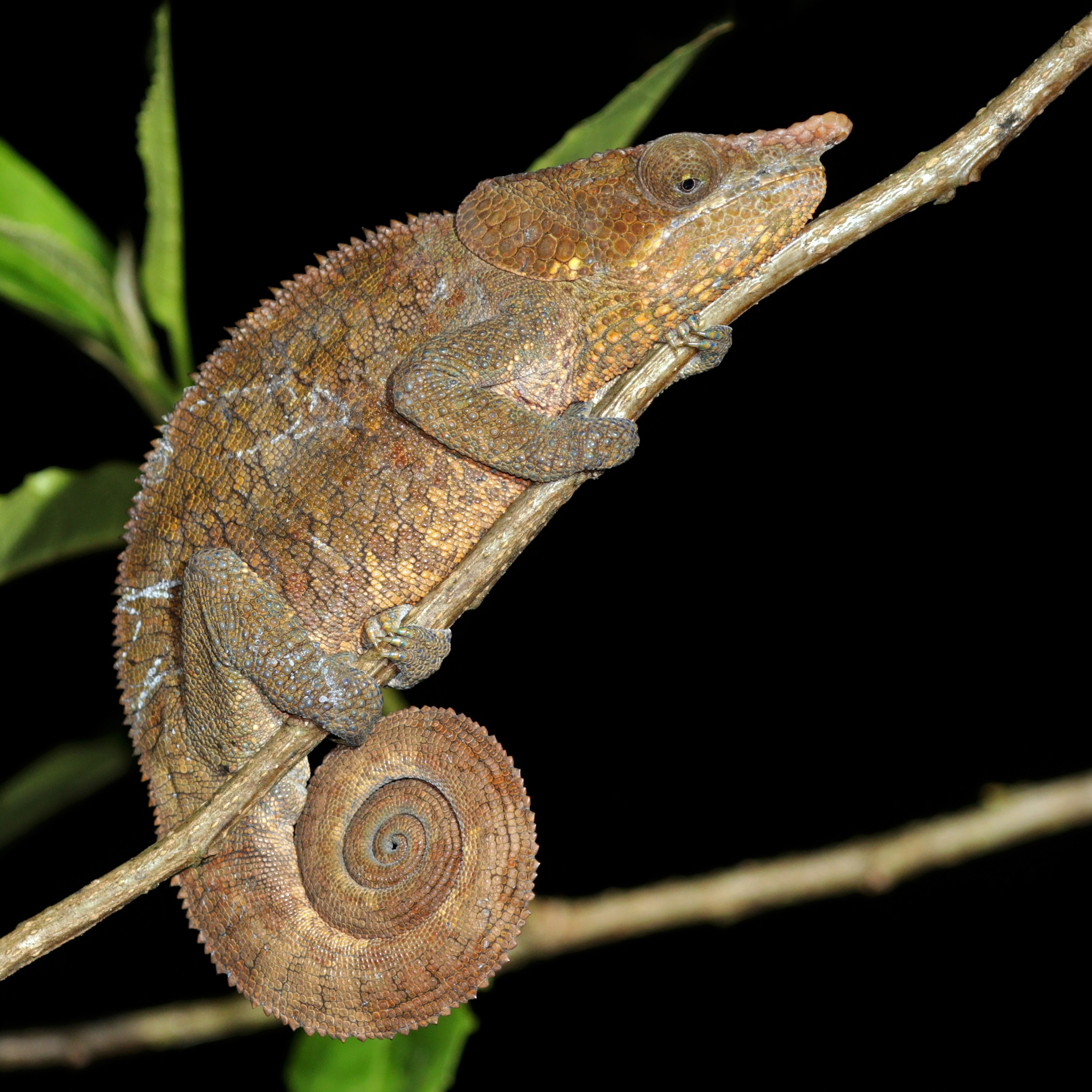
- Male
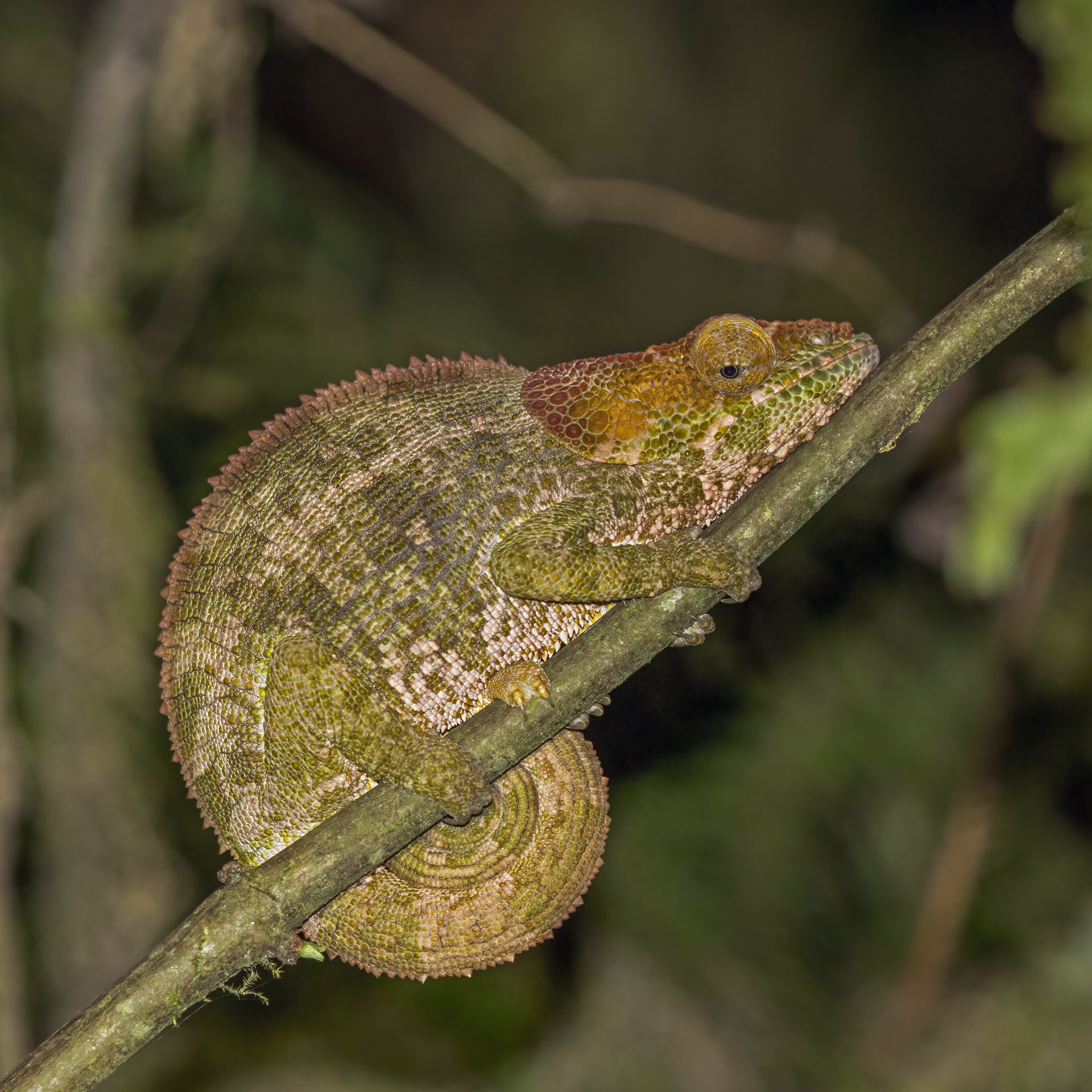
- Female

Conservation status
- Least Concern (IUCN 3.1)

Scientific classification
- Kingdom: Animalia
- Phylum: Chordata
- Class: Reptilia
- Order: Squamata
- Suborder: Iguania
- Family: Chamaeleonidae
- Genus: Calumma
- Species: C. crypticum

Binomial name
- Calumma crypticum Raxworthy & Nussbaum, 2006
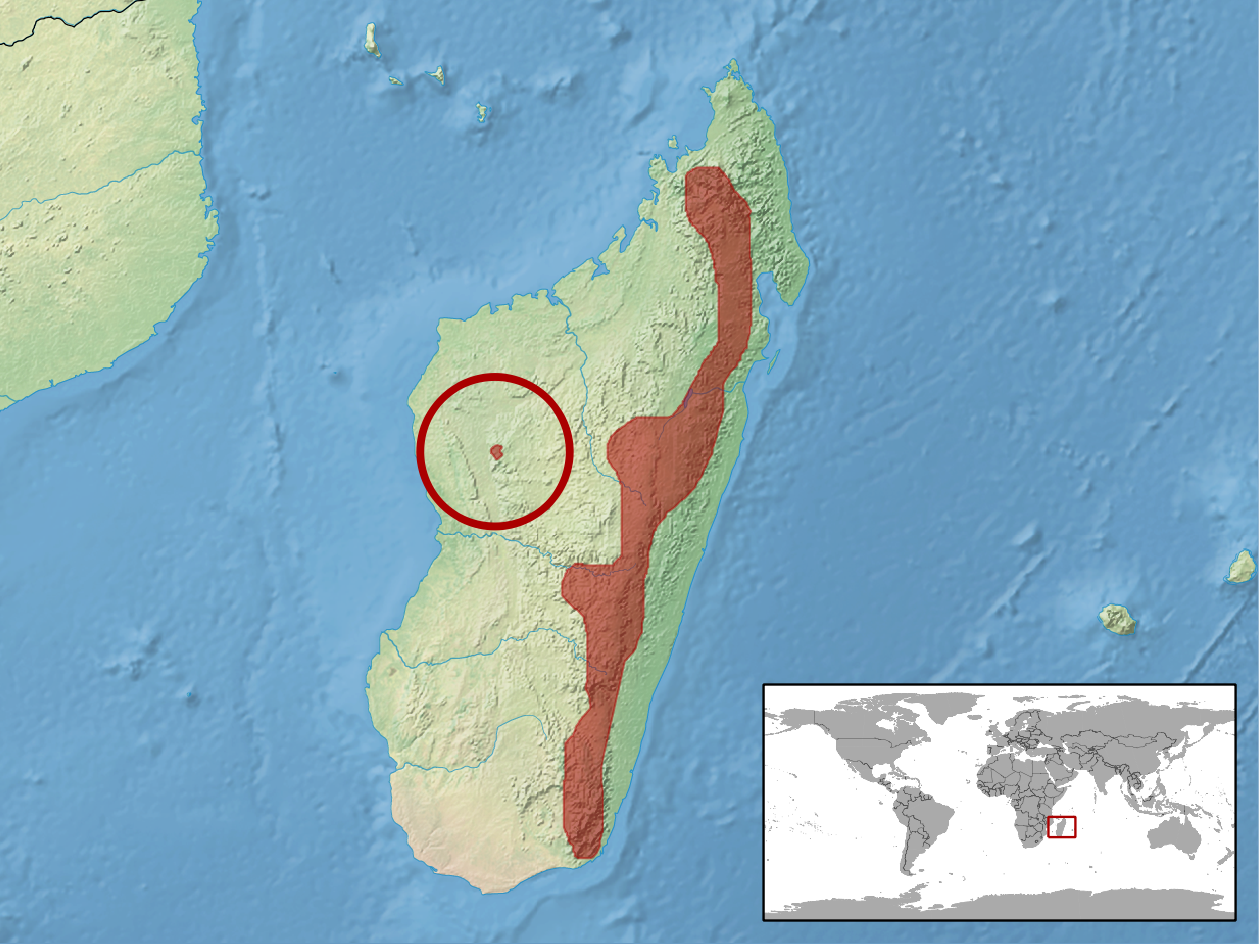

= Calumma crypticum =

Species of lizard

Calumma crypticum, commonly known as the cryptic chameleon or blue-legged chameleon, is a species of chameleon found in eastern Madagascar.

== Taxonomy ==
This species was first described in 2006 as Calumma crypticum by Raxworthy & Nussbaum, one of six new species from mountain regions of Madagascar. It is very similar to, and was previously included in, the short-horned chameleon (Calumma brevicorne), but in 2007, Boumans et al. confirmed that it was sufficiently genetically distinct to be considered a valid species.

== Description ==
Calumma crypticum grows to a length of about 12 cm (5 in) and has large flap-like lobes at the back of the head. The species is sexually dimorphic, the male having a longer snout with a horn-like protrusion on its upper surface, which the female lacks. As with other chameleon species, the colour is variable, depending on the colour of the surroundings, the ambient temperature, and variations in the level of light, but this species is usually quite colourful with rich browns, blues and greens, and the legs are often marked with blue.

== Distribution and habitat ==
Calumma crypticum is endemic to eastern Madagascar where it is a mid-altitude species occurring between 1,050 and 1,850 m (3,445 and 6,070 ft) above sea level. Its range extends from the Tsaratanana Massif and the Ivakoany Massif. It is an arboreal species, living in humid forests; its distribution is patchy because of forest clearance on the central highlands between the mountain blocks, but there is a subpopulation around Ambohitantely in the central west of the island.

== Status ==
This chameleon has a widespread distribution and occurs in a number of protected areas. Suitable habitat is being cleared for agriculture and the population is gradually declining, however the species is sufficiently common that the International Union for Conservation of Nature has assessed its conservation status as being of least concern.

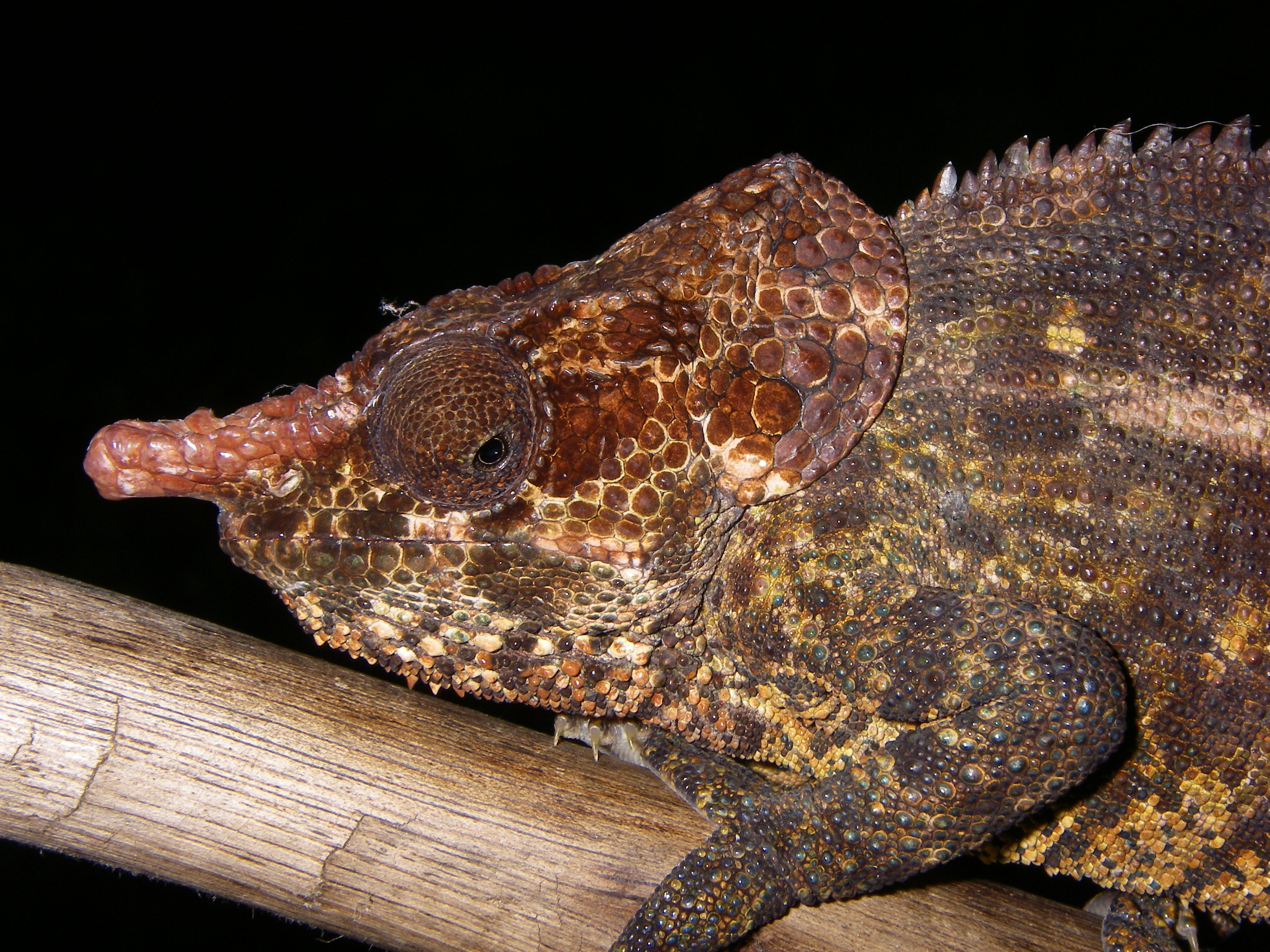
Male, Ranomafana

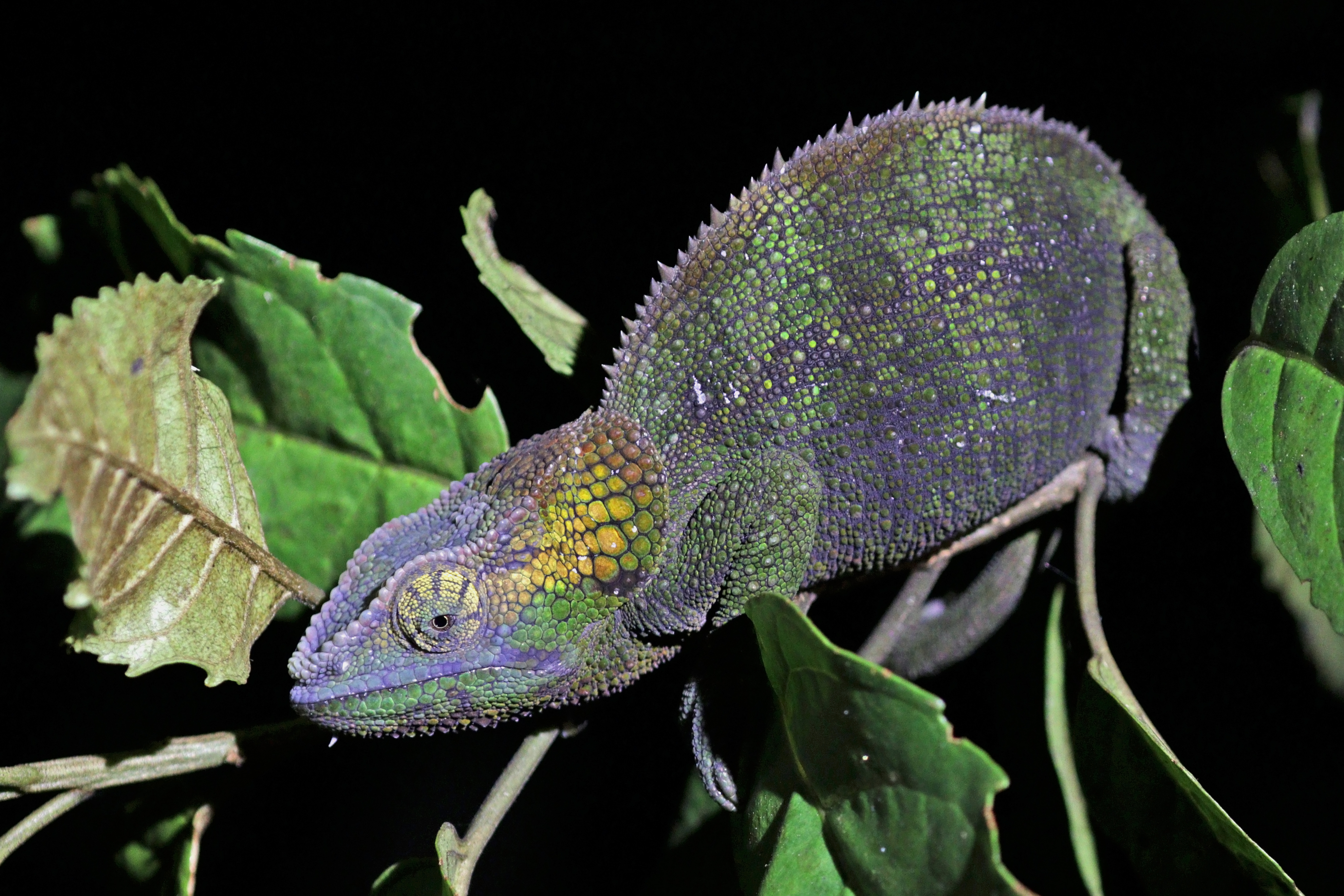
Female, Ranomafana
