= Furcifer monoceras =

Scientific classification
- Kingdom: Animalia
- Phylum: Chordata
- Class: Reptilia
- Order: Squamata
- Suborder: Iguania
- Family: Chamaeleonidae
- Genus: Furcifer
- Species: F. monoceras

Binomial name
- Furcifer monoceras Boettger, 1913

Species of chameleon

The long-nosed rhinoceros chameleon (Furcifer monoceras) is a species of chameleon endemic to Madagascar. It is capable of changing colors, but usually only displays one color all throughout their body. They can be all-orange, all light brown, all-purple, all red with some green lines, and all green with brown stripes.

They have three toes stuck together on one side of their foot, and on the other side, they have two stuck together toes. They rely on camouflage to catch their food with a long sticky tongue. Their tail is prehensile like most other chameleons in the Furcifer genus. They are arboreal.

It is only known from one holotype specimen from Betsako, east of Mahajanga. Long considered conspecific with the rhinoceros chameleon (F. rhinoceratus), a 2018 study of minor details of its morphology indicated that it was a distinct species.

== Sources ==
1. What Reptile? A Buyer's Guide For Reptiles and Amphibians, by Chris Mattison
2. Chameleons, by Chris Mattison and Nick Garbutt
3. The Chameleon Handbook, by Francois Le Berre
4. G.M.S. Industries Book Series
