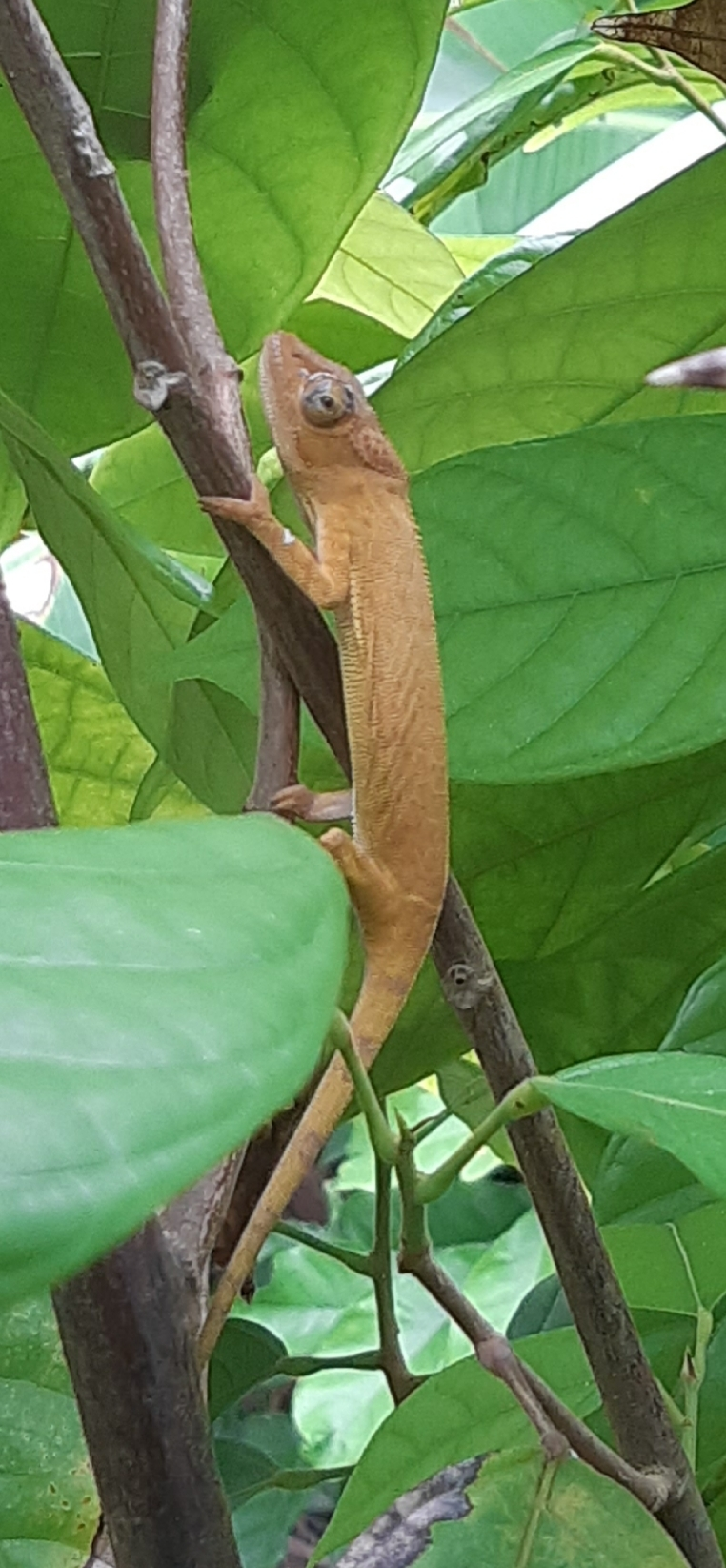

Conservation status
- Least Concern (IUCN 3.1)

Scientific classification
- Kingdom: Animalia
- Phylum: Chordata
- Class: Reptilia
- Order: Squamata
- Suborder: Iguania
- Family: Chamaeleonidae
- Genus: Furcifer
- Species: F. polleni

Binomial name
- Furcifer polleni (Peters, 1874)
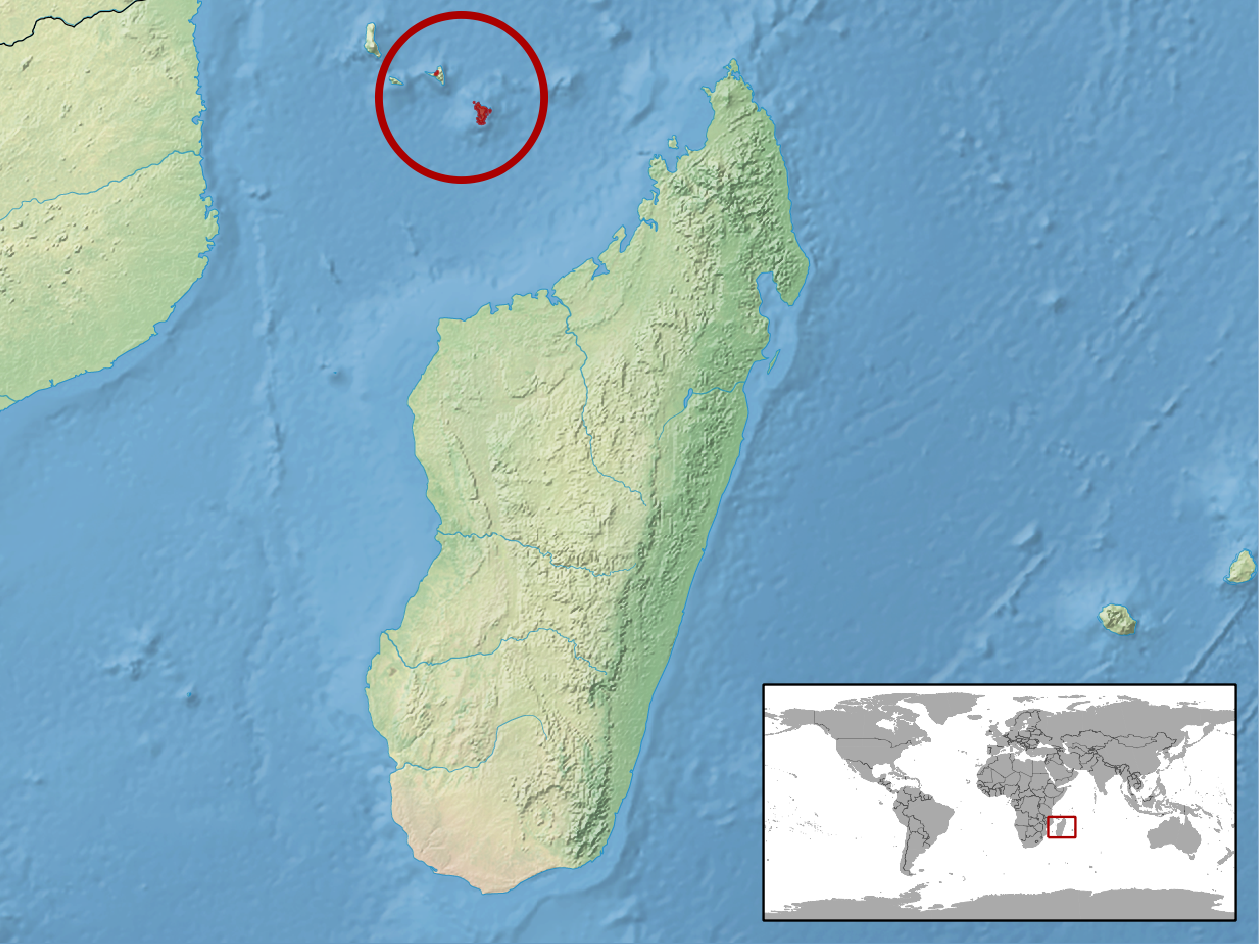

Synonyms
- Chamaeleon polleni Peters, 1874

= Mayotte chameleon =

Species of lizard

The Mayotte chameleon (Furcifer polleni) is a species of chameleon that is endemic to Mayotte in the Comoros Islands. It was first described by Wilhelm Peters in 1874.

== Etymology ==
The specific name, polleni, is in honor of Dutch naturalist François Pollen.

== Distribution and habitat ==
Furcifer polleni is endemic to the island of Mayotte, one of the Comoros Islands in the Indian Ocean. It is found over most of the island, an area of 376.5 square kilometres (145.4 square miles). It was introduced by humans onto the Comoran island of Anjouan, where it became established in the town of Hombo. This species is ranked as being of Least Concern by the International Union for Conservation of Nature (IUCN), and has been found at between 27 and 459 metres (89 and 1,506 feet) above sea level. This species is found in a range of habitats. It is protected by law in Mayotte and is included in Appendix II of the CITES treaty.

In an integrated field study on Mayotte, 35 specimens of Furcifer polleni were found in a range of habitats at altitudes of up to 459 metres (1,506 ft). These included (in approximately equal numbers) pristine forests, degraded woodlands, plantations and scrubby dry vegetation. No individuals were found in mangrove forests but several were found in urban areas. During the ten years starting in 2000, the number of Mayotte chameleons exported from the island was 1,562. This does not seem to have had much influence on the population size and was in contrast to the endemic chameleon species on Grand Comoro, Furcifer cephalolepis, which suffered a much heavier trade. Over 14,000 specimens were exported from there during the same period and this seems to have impacted wild populations. The study concluded that the population of the Mayotte chameleon is stable, and that despite the small area in which it occurs, it is likely to survive due to its ability to live in non-natural habitats.

== Description ==
The Mayotte chameleon is varying shades of light and dark green in colour.

== Taxonomy ==
The species was initially described by Wilhelm Peters in 1874 as Chamaeleon polleni. In 1986, it was transferred to genus Furcifer by Charles Klaver & Wolfgang Böhme. It is commonly known as the Mayotte chameleon.
