= Furcifer tuzetae =

Conservation status
- Data Deficient (IUCN 3.1)

Scientific classification
- Kingdom: Animalia
- Phylum: Chordata
- Class: Reptilia
- Order: Squamata
- Suborder: Iguania
- Family: Chamaeleonidae
- Genus: Furcifer
- Species: F. tuzetae

Binomial name
- Furcifer tuzetae (Brygoo, Bourgat & Domergue, 1972)
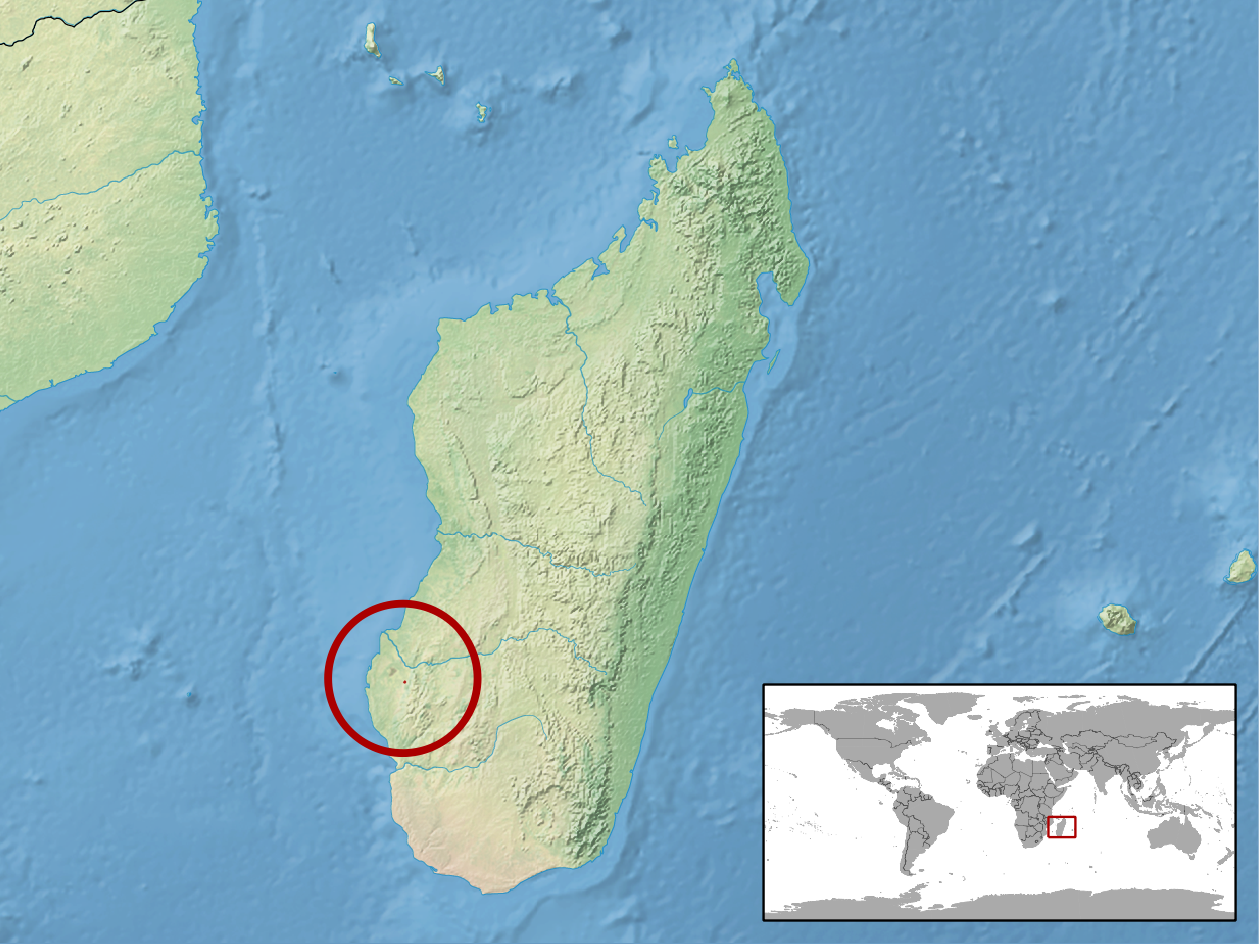

Synonyms
- Chamaeleo tuzetae Brygoo, Bourgat & Domerque, 1972; Furcifer tuzetae — Glaw & Vences, 1994

Species of lizard

Furcifer tuzetae is a species of chameleon that is endemic to Madagascar. It is only known from its type locality, Andrenalamivola near Befandriana Sud. It was described by Édouard-Raoul Brygoo, Robert M. Bourgat and Charles Antoine Domergue in 1972. The International Union for Conservation of Nature have rated this species as "data deficient".

== Etymology ==
The specific name, tuzetae, is in honor of French parasitologist Odette Tuzet (1906–1976).

== Distribution and habitat ==
Furcifer tuzetae is found in Madagascar. Its type locality is Andrenalamivola (Befandriana Sud). Furcifer tuzetae is known from an area of dry forest; it might occur in gallery forests. Only a single specimen of the species has been collected in Andrenalamivola, although it may be found elsewhere in Befandriana Sud, where there is a large area of suitable habitat.

== Reproduction ==
Furcifer tuzetae is oviparous.

== Conservation status ==
The species F. tuzetae was rated as "data deficient" by the International Union for Conservation of Nature (IUCN) as not enough data have been collected. It is likely that the population of the species is declining because it has only been found once, despite multiple surveys being carried out to find the species. It may be affected by the slash-and-burn method of agriculture and logging for charcoal.

== Taxonomy ==
Furcifer tuzetae was described initially by Brygoo, Bourgat and Domergue in 1972 under the name Chamaeleo tutzetae. It became known as Furcifer tuzetae when Glaw and Vences transferred it to the genus Furcifer in 1994.
