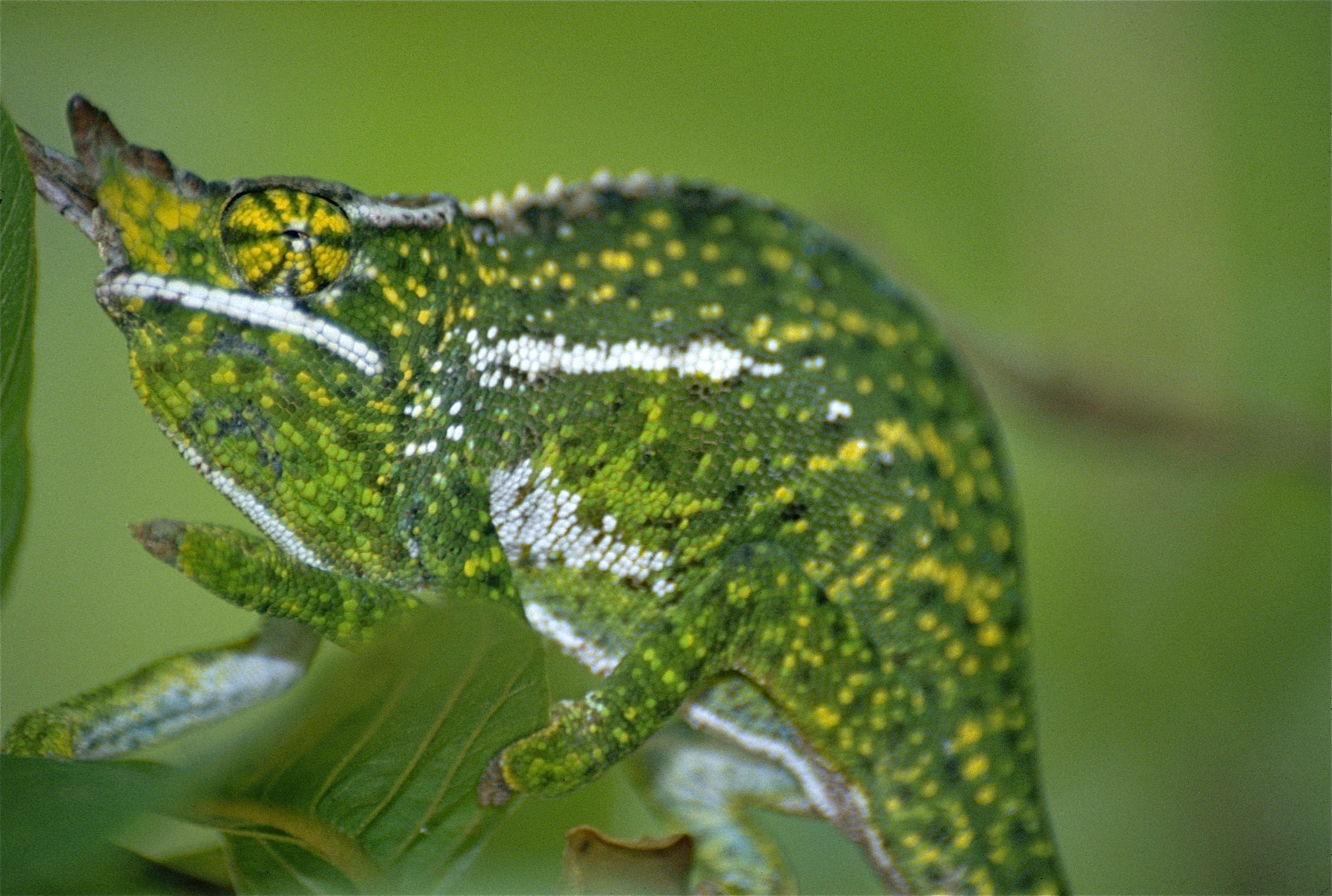
- male

Conservation status
- Least Concern (IUCN 3.1)

Scientific classification
- Kingdom: Animalia
- Phylum: Chordata
- Class: Reptilia
- Order: Squamata
- Suborder: Iguania
- Family: Chamaeleonidae
- Genus: Furcifer
- Species: F. willsii

Binomial name
- Furcifer willsii (Günther, 1890)
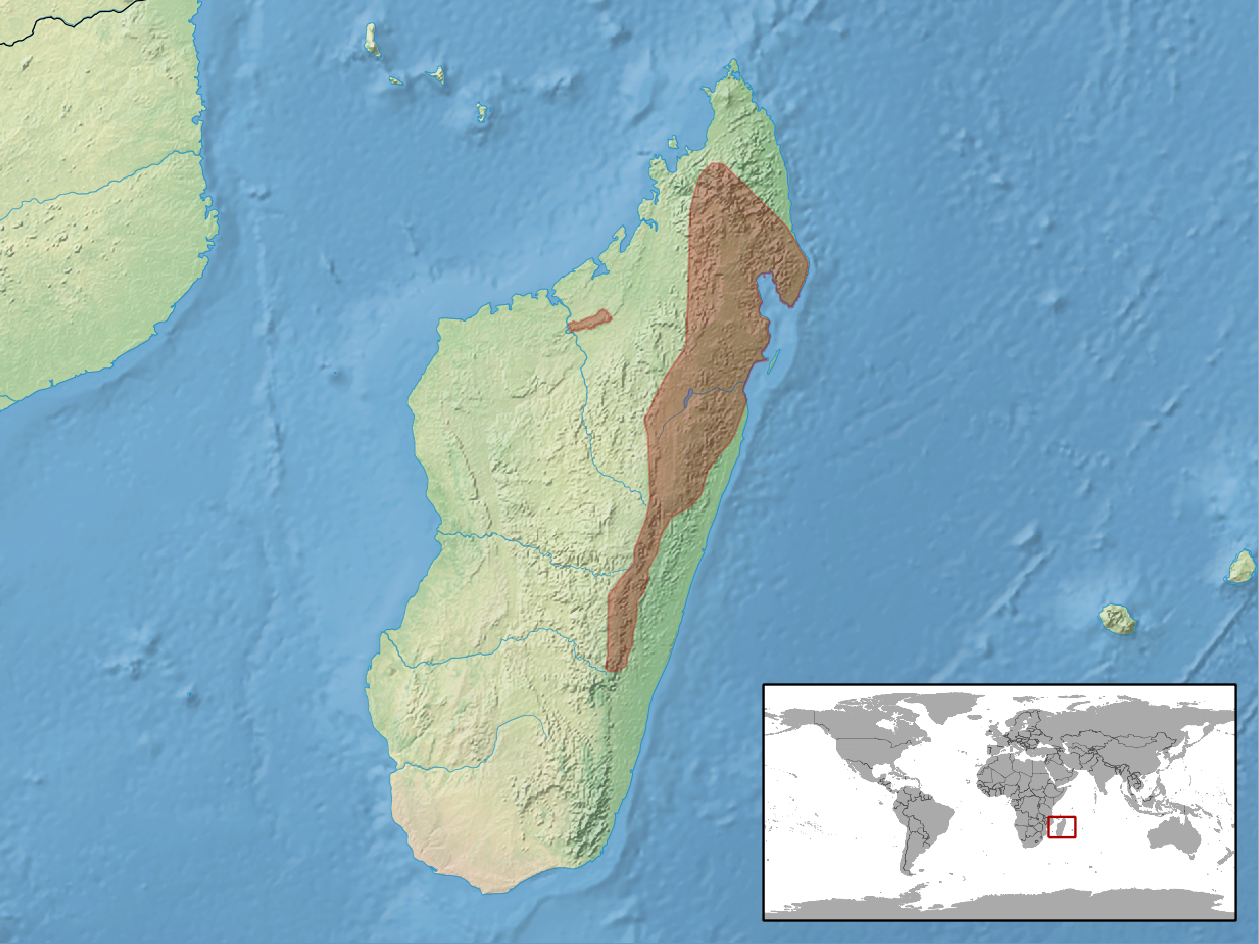
- Geographic range of Furcifer willsii

Synonyms
- Chamaeleon willsii Günther, 1890; Furcifer willsii — Klaver & Böhme, 1986

= Canopy chameleon =

Species of lizard

The canopy chameleon (Furcifer willsii), also known commonly as Wills's chameleon or incorrectly as Will's chameleon, is a species of lizard in the family Chamaeleonidae. The species is endemic to Madagascar. The species was originally described by Albert Günther in 1890.

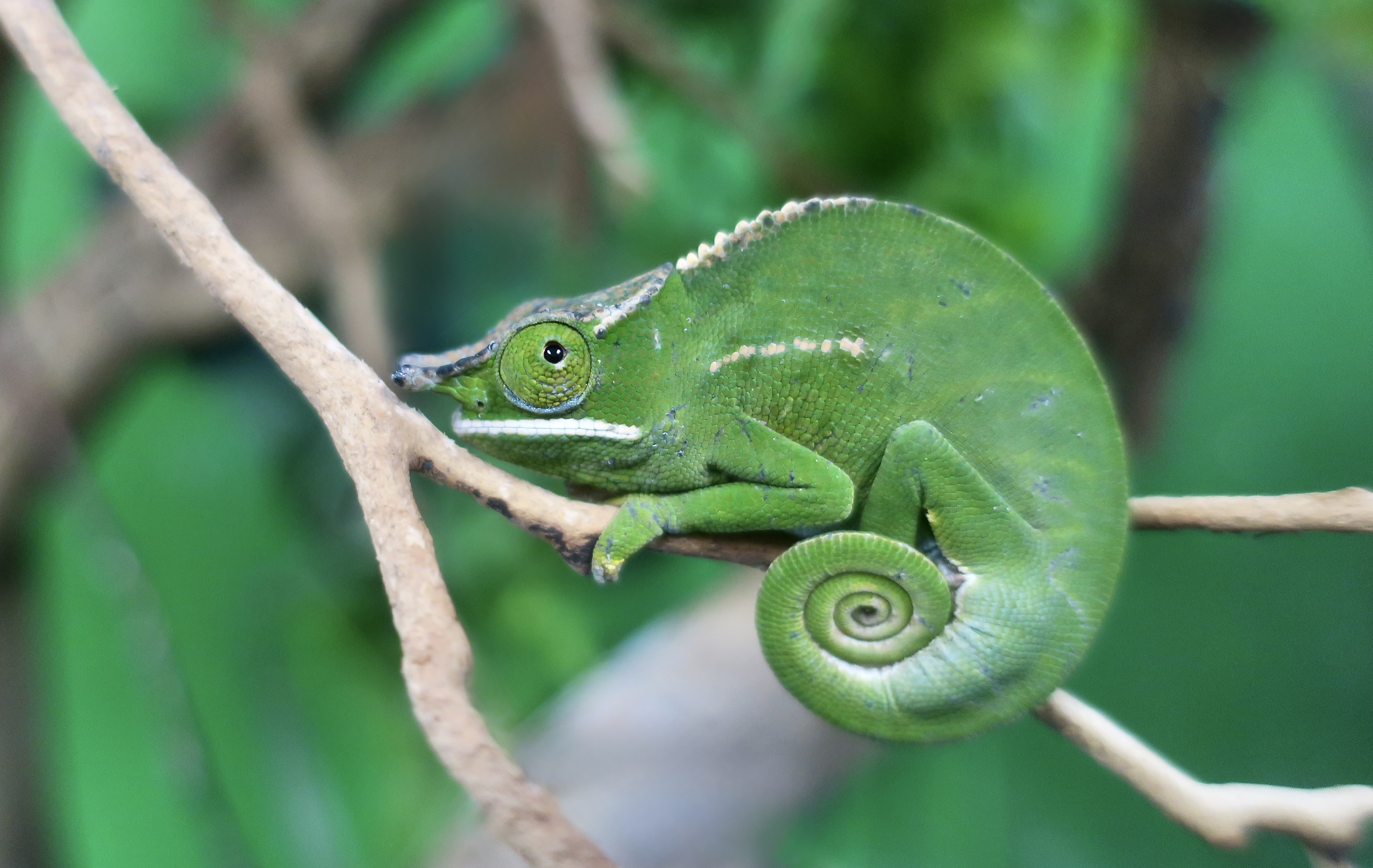
A male at LLL Reptiles, a reptile store in Henderson, Nevada.

== Etymology ==
The specific name, willsii, is in honour of English ornithologist Rev. James Wills (1836–1898), who was a missionary in Madagascar from 1870 to 1898.

== Geographic range and habitat ==
Furcifer willsii is endemic to east-central and northeastern Madagascar, along with an isolated range in the north-central part of the island. The type locality of west Imerina Imady, in a forest region. The species can be found at between 600 and 1,300 metres (2,000 and 4,300 feet) above sea level and is estimated to be found over an area of 100,350 square kilometres (38,750 square miles). Records show that this species has been found Tsingy de Bemaraha Strict Nature Reserve. F. willsii may have been sighted once in western Madagascar at Ankarafantsika National Park, although this observation has not been verified as of 2007. Reports from Tsingy de Bemaraha Strict Nature Reserve are uncertain: they may be of F. willsii, F. petteri, or a similar, undescribed species.

== Conservation status ==
The International Union for Conservation of Nature (IUCN) believe that the population of the canopy chameleon is declining. However, it is rated as Least Concern as there is not enough evidence that this species is declining fast enough to become endangered or threatened. Furcifer willsii is threatened by agricultural clearance and logging.

Furcifer willsii is an arboreal species often found high in the canopy mostly in humid forests. It seems to be able to adapt to degraded habitats at the edge of native forests. Large numbers of this species were exported from Madagascar between 1989 and 1993 before the trade from Madagascar was banned by the CITES multilateral treaty.

== Description ==
Furcifer willsii is green and white in colour, sometimes with a hint of brown along the back and head.

== Reproduction ==
F. willsii is oviparous.

== Taxonomy ==
Furcifer willsii was initially described in 1890 by Albert Günther as Chamaeleon willsii. In 1986, it was transferred to the genus Furcifer by Charles Klaver & Wolfgang Böhme. It is commonly known as the canopy chameleon.
