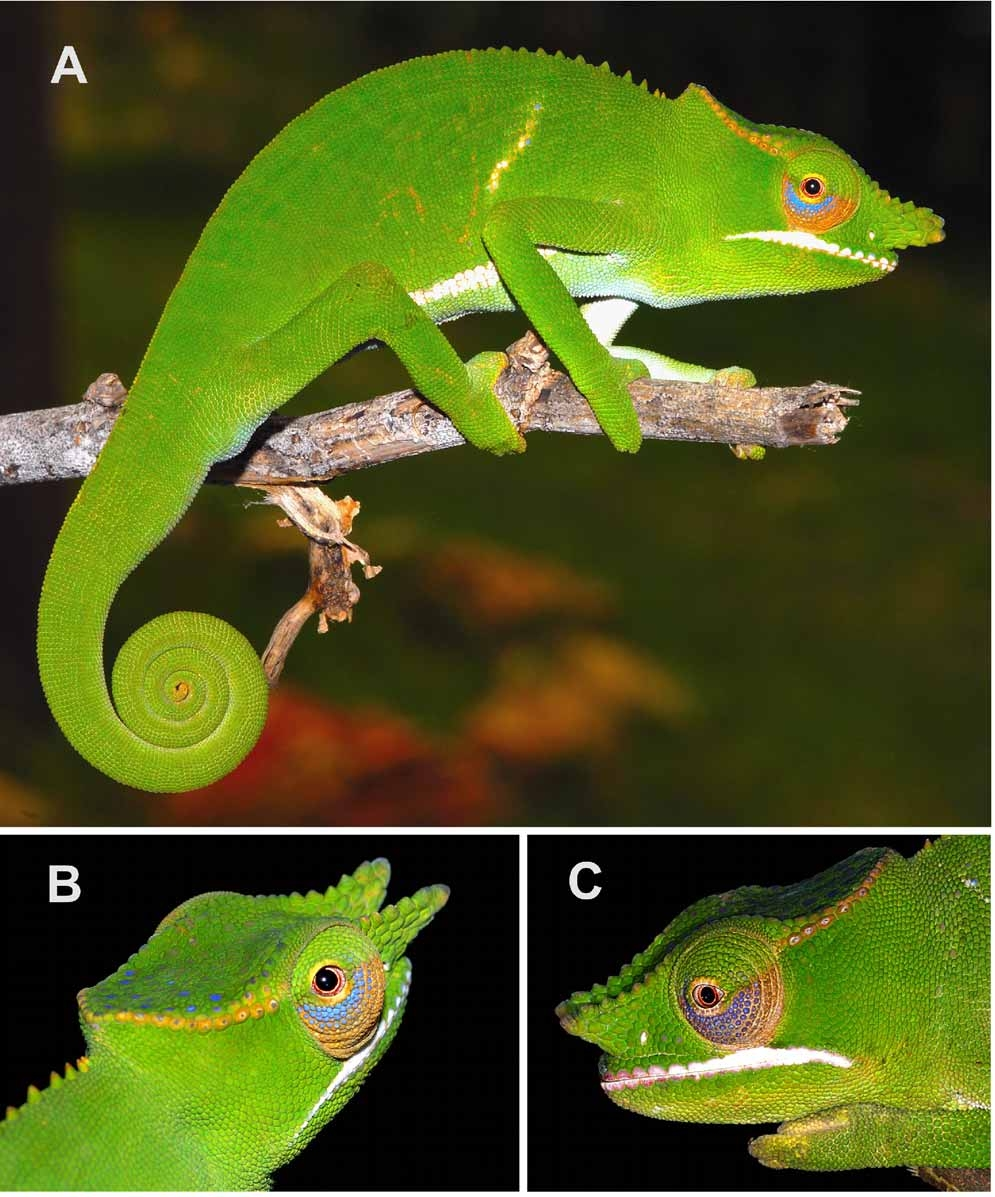
- Male holotype of Furcifer timoni

Conservation status
- Near Threatened (IUCN 3.1)

Scientific classification
- Kingdom: Animalia
- Phylum: Chordata
- Class: Reptilia
- Order: Squamata
- Suborder: Iguania
- Family: Chamaeleonidae
- Genus: Furcifer
- Species: F. timoni

Binomial name
- Furcifer timoni Glaw, J. Köhler & Vences, 2009
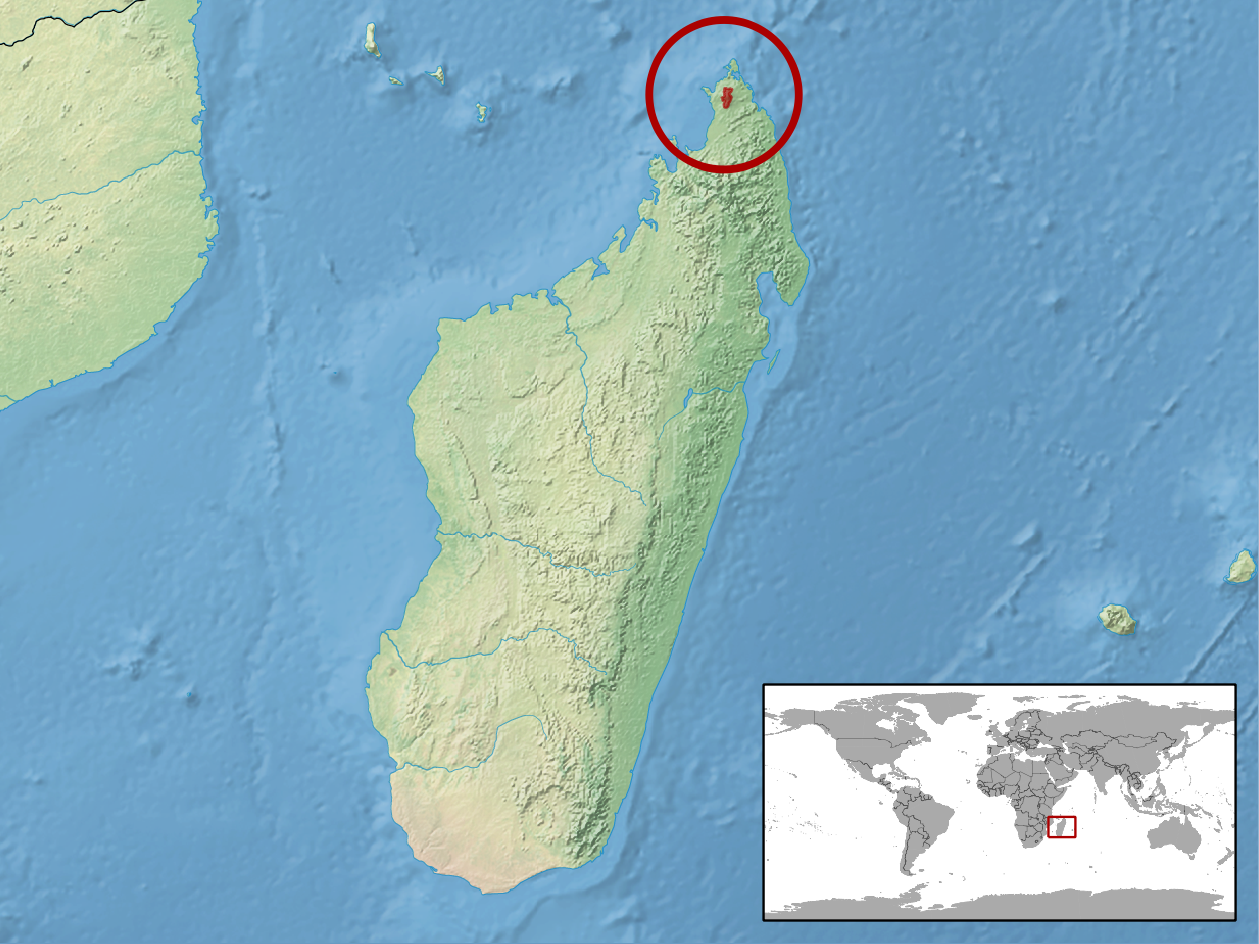

= Furcifer timoni =

Species of lizard

Furcifer timoni is a species of chameleon, a lizard in the family Chamaeleonidae. The species is endemic to Madagascar.

== Etymology ==
The specific name, timoni, is in honor of Timon Robert Glaw (born 2004), who is the son of German herpetologist Frank Glaw, senior author of this species.

== Geographic range and habitat ==
Furcifer timoni is endemic to the Montagne d'Ambre National Park (Amber Mountain National Park) near the northern tip of Madagascar. Its geographic range probably extends to 385 square kilometres (149 square miles) at a height of between 750 and 900 metres (2,460 and 2,950 feet) above sea level. Based on some photographic records, it may also be found in the Marojejy National Park (Marojejy Massif), although this fact has not been confirmed. Its preferred natural habitat is forest.

== Conservation status ==
Furcifer timoni has been ranked by the International Union for Conservation of Nature (IUCN) to be Near Threatened, and it is one of several species of chameleon discovered since 1999. It has been listed by the IUCN as Near Threatened because there is a possible threat which may affect the species. If the threat were to become active, Furcifer timoni would not become Critically Endangered. Instead, as it has a range of 385 square kilometres (149 square miles) in one place, it would be able to be classified as endangered. There are also threats of logging for charcoal and the collection of rosewood.

== Description ==
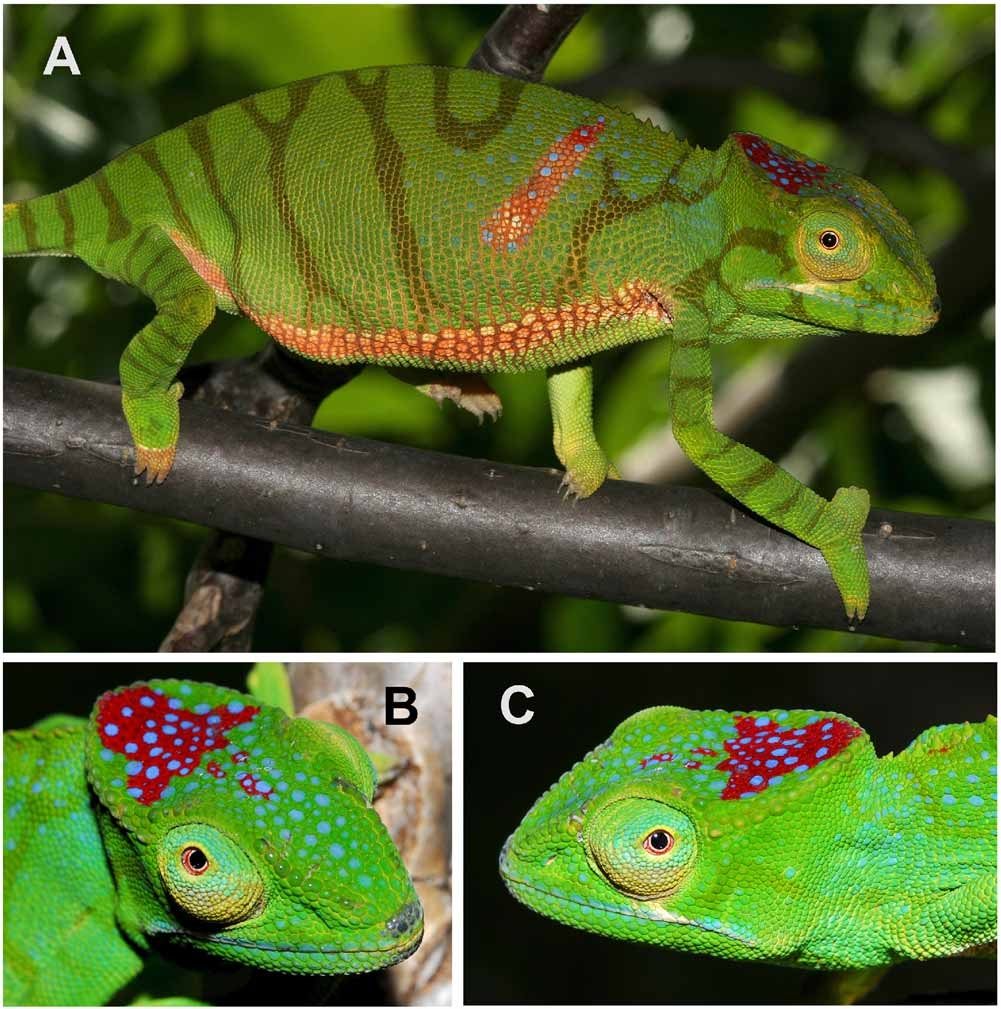
Gravid female paratype of Furcifer timoni

Female specimens of F. timoni have a base colour of green, and a yellow-orange underside. The body is covered in blue spots, and the top of the head is red with blue spots. The head of males of the species is green with purplish spots.

== Reproduction ==
Furcifer timoni is oviparous. Female specimens have been found with up to 14 eggs.

== Taxonomy ==
Furcifer timoni was initially described as a new species in 2009 by German herpetologists Frank Glaw, Jörn Köhler, and Miguel Vences.
