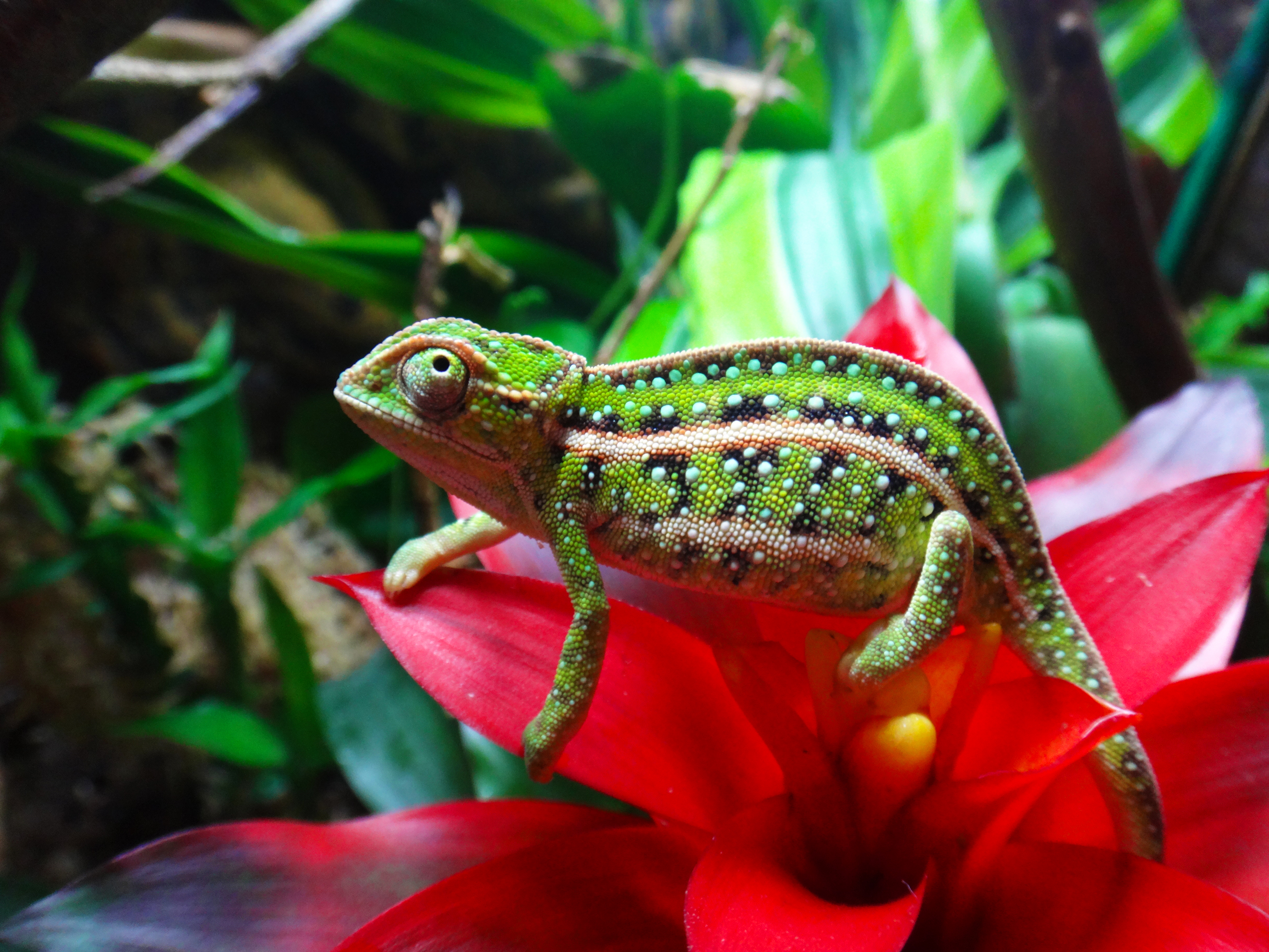

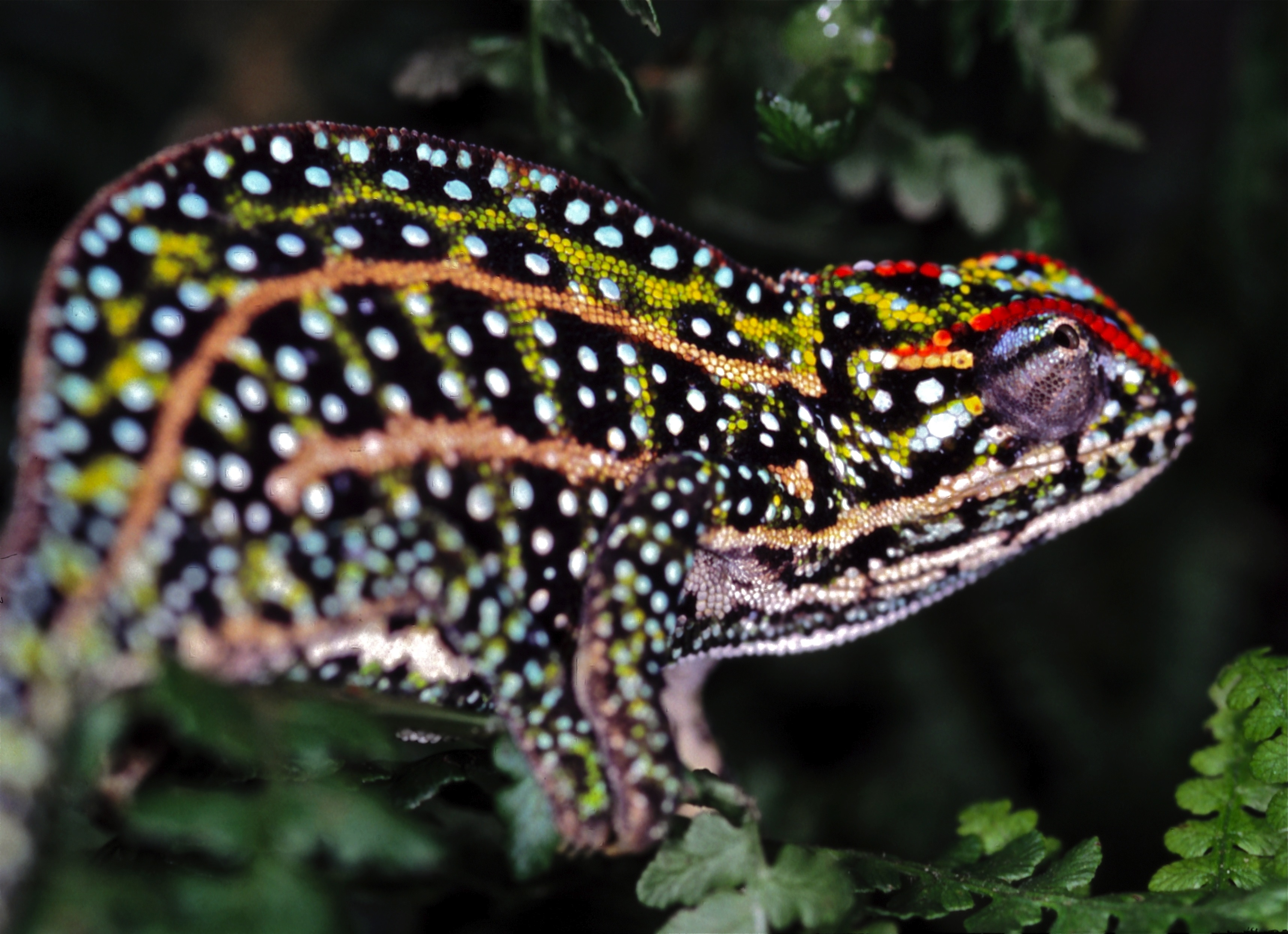

Conservation status
- Vulnerable (IUCN 3.1)

Scientific classification
- Kingdom: Animalia
- Phylum: Chordata
- Class: Reptilia
- Order: Squamata
- Suborder: Iguania
- Family: Chamaeleonidae
- Genus: Furcifer
- Species: F. campani

Binomial name
- Furcifer campani (Grandidier, 1872)
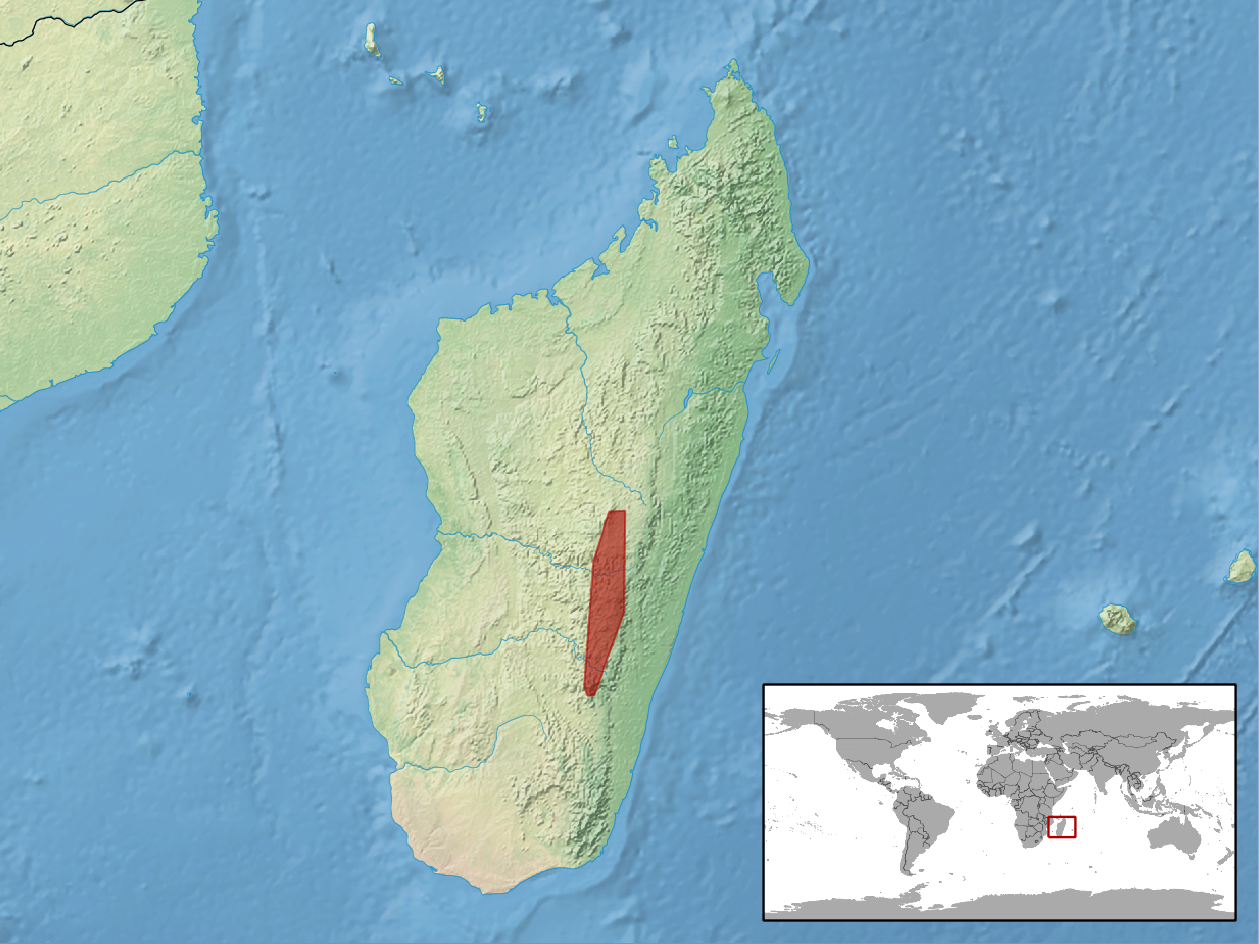

Synonyms
- Chamæleo Campani Grandidier, 1872; Chameleo octotaeniatus Boettger, 1881; Furcifer campani — Glaw & Vences, 1994

= Jewelled chameleon =

Species of lizard

The jewelled chameleon (Furcifer campani), also commonly known as Campan's chameleon or the Madagascar forest chameleon, is a species of lizard in the family Chamaeleonidae. The species is endemic to the central highlands of Madagascar, where it is threatened by bush fires and habitat loss.

== Etymology ==
The specific name, campani, is in honour of Dominique Campan, a French resident of Madagascar.

== Description ==
F. campani grows to a total length (including tail) of about 14 centimetres (5.5 in). The background colour varies from pale green through dark green to brown. There are three pale brown, lateral stripes running along each side of the body and numerous small bright-coloured spots between them. The head is often decorated with small red spots. This chameleon has a crest running along its back composed of small projecting granules.

== Distribution and habitat ==
F. campani is endemic to the central mountainous region of Madagascar where it lives at altitudes of 1,850 to 2,300 metres (6,070 to 7,550 ft). Its range extends from Ankaratra, an extinct volcano, to the Andringitra National Park, an area of 14,500 square kilometres (5,600 sq mi). However, only part of this is suitable habitat, and its population is fragmented. It is a terrestrial species and its habitat is mountain grass and heathland with shrubs and isolated trees.

== Behaviour and diet ==
Chameleons are ambush predators, standing still and waiting for suitable prey to come within reach. The diet of a chameleon consists largely of insects which it catches by shooting out its long tongue which has a sticky tip.

== Reproduction ==
Reproduction in F. campani takes place two or three times a year. Clutches of eight to twelve eggs are laid in concealed locations. When reared in the laboratory, incubation takes about nine months at a temperature of 20 °C (68 °F), and the emerging juveniles are about 23 mm (0.9 in) long. The young grow fast and are sexually mature at three months. Some reports say that this chameleon hibernates, burying itself in leaves during the winter months.

== Conservation status ==
In some areas of shrubby savannah grassland F. campani is reported to be common, but no real assessment of its abundance has been made. The IUCN Red List of Threatened Species lists it as being "Vulnerable". This is because its habitat is being cleared for agricultural production, and there is an annual cycle of burning. It shares its range with the white-lined chameleon (F. lateralis), and that species seems better able to cope with the disturbance and degradation to the habitat caused by humans. It should be safe from human disturbance in the national park, but this is not the case on the Ankaratra mountains. Exports of F. campani peaked in 1994 when over five thousand were removed from the island. Although the export of most species of chameleons from Madagascar, including F. campani, has been banned since then, some may still be being collected. The IUCN consider that steps should be taken to limit the damage done by fires to the grassland where F. campani is found.
