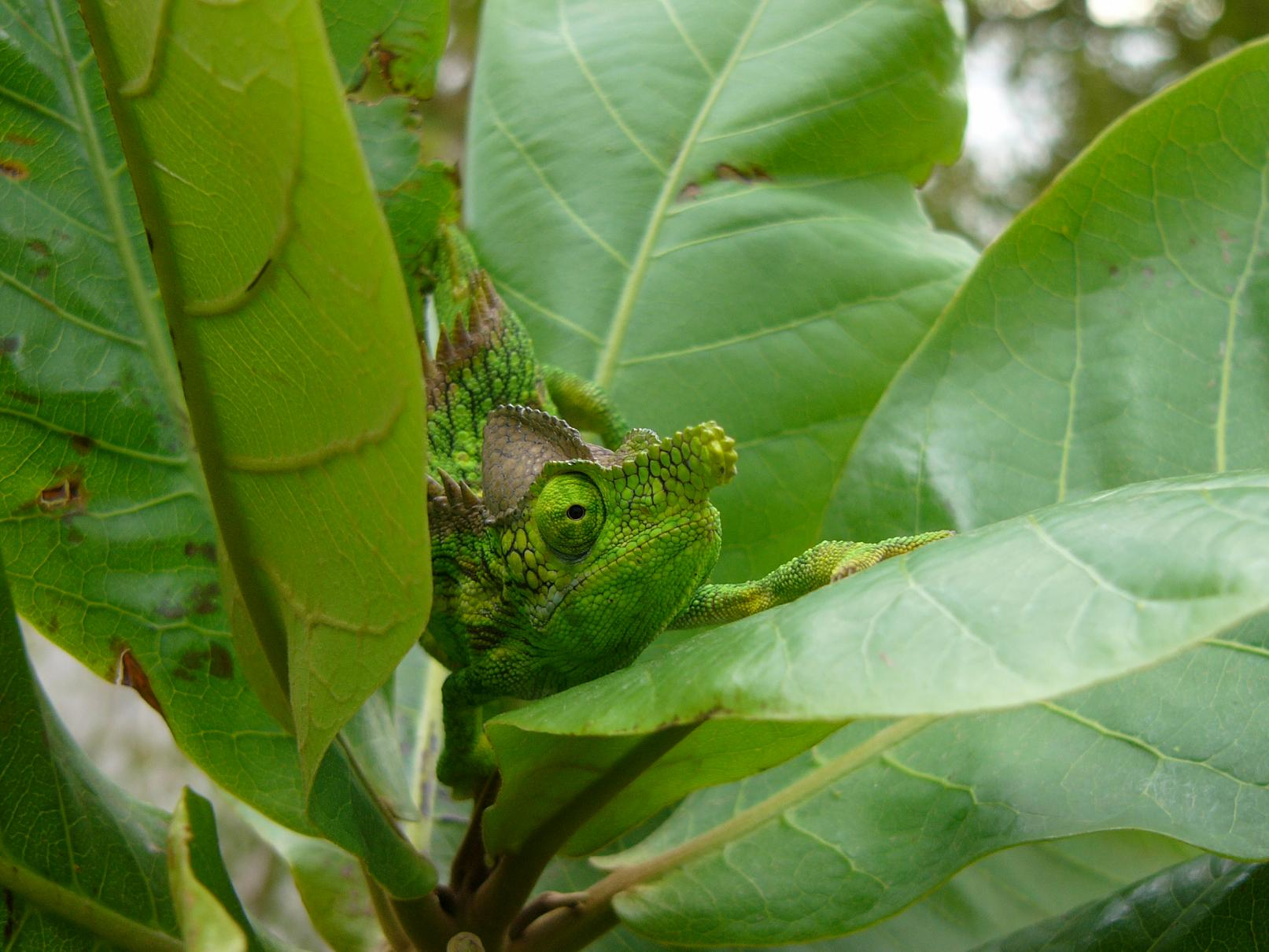
- male

Conservation status
- Vulnerable (IUCN 3.1)

Scientific classification
- Kingdom: Animalia
- Phylum: Chordata
- Class: Reptilia
- Order: Squamata
- Suborder: Iguania
- Family: Chamaeleonidae
- Genus: Furcifer
- Species: F. antimena

Binomial name
- Furcifer antimena (Grandidier, 1872)
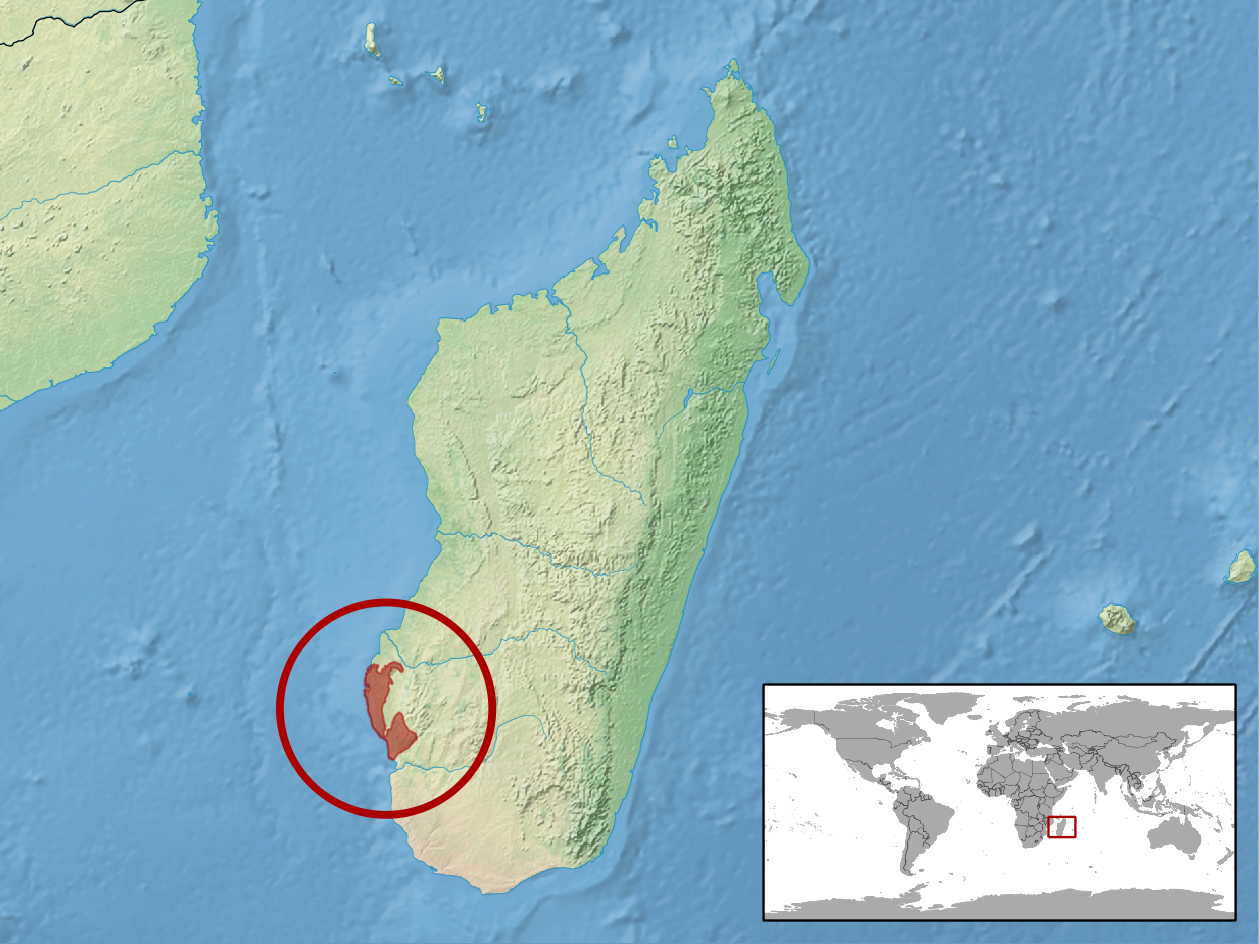

Synonyms
- Chamaeleo antimena Grandidier 1872

= Antimena chameleon =

Species of lizard

The Antimena chameleon (Furcifer antimena) is a species of chameleon that is endemic to southwest Madagascar. It was initially described by French naturalist Alfred Grandidier in 1872.

== Distribution and habitat ==
Furcifer antimena can be found in southwest Madagascar, more specifically between 5 and 80 metres (16 and 262 feet) above sea level mainly around Antsokay, Toliara and Ankotapiky. It is believed to occur over an area of 6,310 square kilometres (2,440 sq mi); the Onilahy River and Mangoky River both seem to be natural boundaries to the range of this species. Furcifer antimena was ranked as a Vulnerable species by the International Union for Conservation of Nature (IUCN) because it is found in an area where there is massive clearing of the forest for agriculture and charcoal production and because the population is believed to be declining.

== Description ==
Furcifer antimena males have a dorsal crest formed of about thirty cone-shaped scales, each of which is between 3 and 6 millimetres (0.12 and 0.24 inches) in length. The males are green with yellow and/or whitish stripes, and females are fully dark green. Males can grow to a maximum length of 34 centimetres (13 inches), and females to 17 centimetres (6.7 inches). There is a projection on the tip of the snout which is larger in males than in females.

== Biology ==
Furcifer antimena typically lives among thorny scrub in dry savannah locations. The female lays a clutch of between ten and fifteen eggs in a concealed position, burying them in sandy soil. The young hatch out about a year later.

== Taxonomy ==
Furcifer antimena was first described in 1872 by French naturalist and explorer Alfred Grandidier. It is commonly known as the Antimena chameleon after the name of the species. There are several synonyms: Chamaeleo antimena (Grandidier, 1872), Chamaeleon rhinoceratus lineatus (Methuen & Hewitt, 1913), and Furcifer antimena (Glaw & Vences, 1944).
