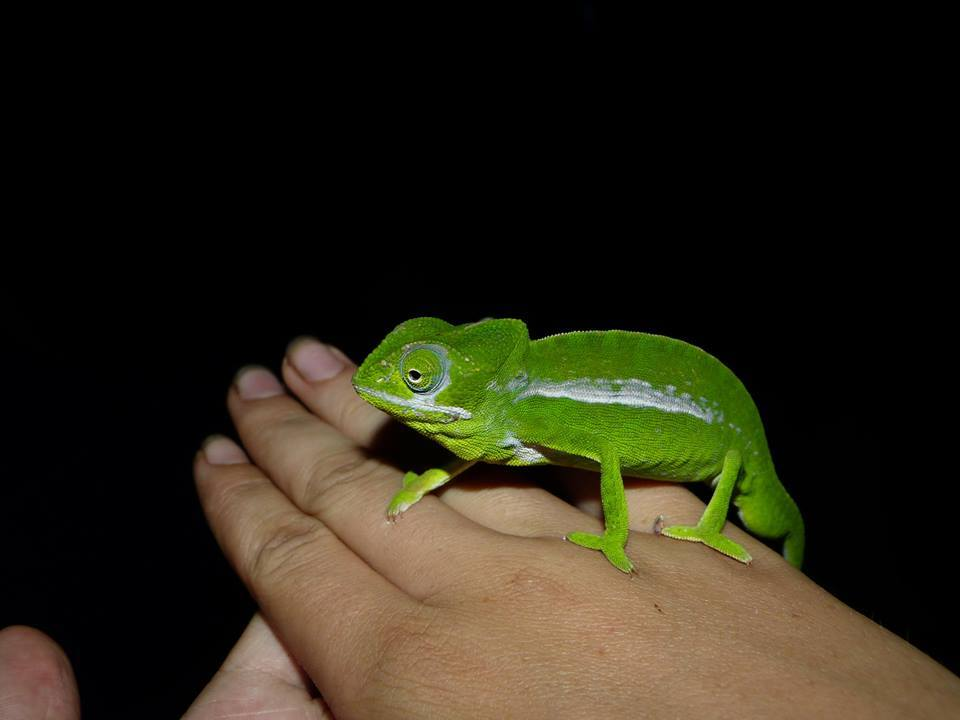
- male

Conservation status
- Least Concern (IUCN 3.1)

Scientific classification
- Kingdom: Animalia
- Phylum: Chordata
- Class: Reptilia
- Order: Squamata
- Suborder: Iguania
- Family: Chamaeleonidae
- Genus: Furcifer
- Species: F. viridis

Binomial name
- Furcifer viridis Florio, Ingram, Rakotondravony, Louis Jr., & Raxworthy, 2012
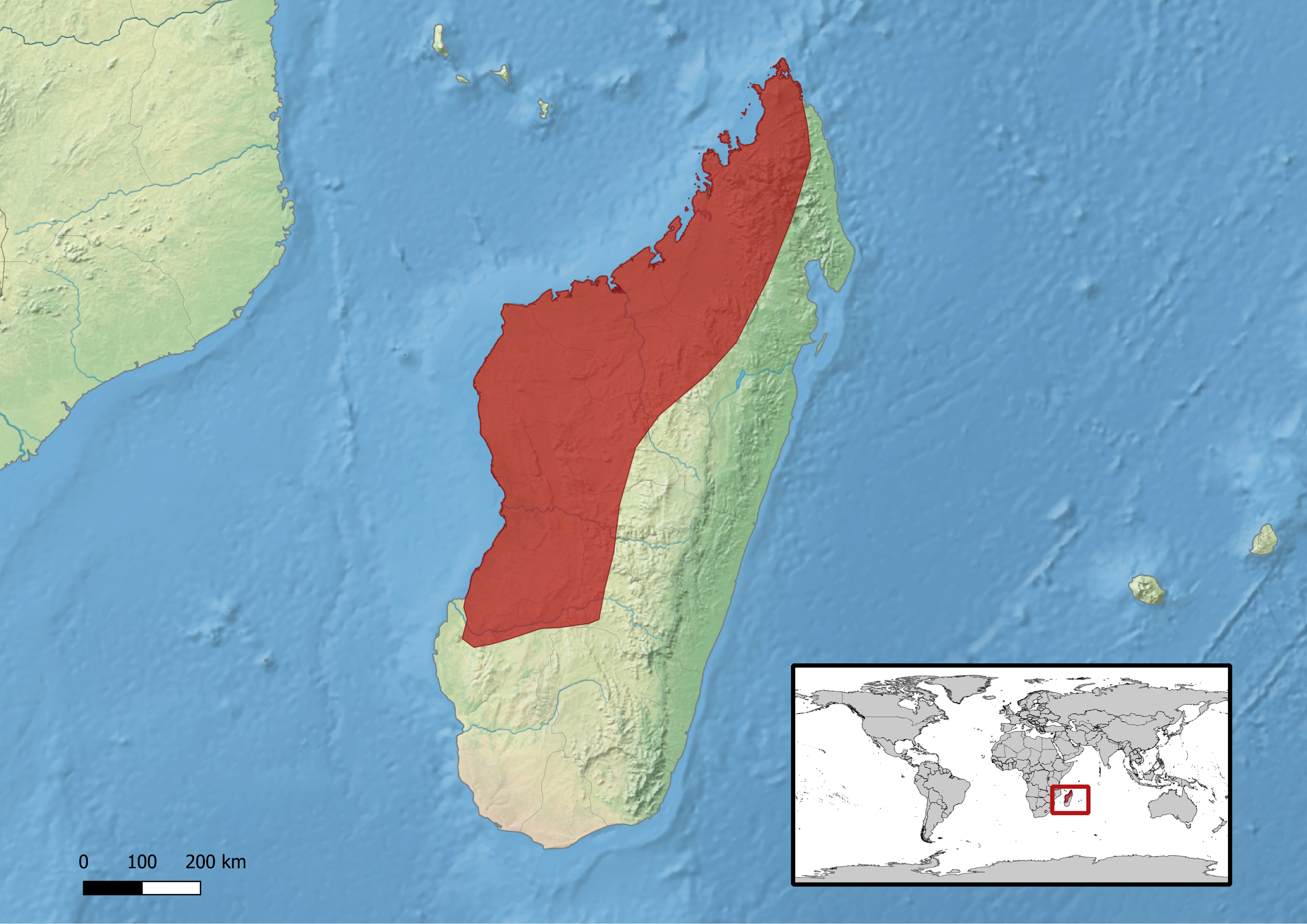

= Furcifer viridis =

Species of lizard

Furcifer viridis, the green chameleon, is a species of chameleon found widely in forest, scrub and grasslands in western and northern Madagascar. Females are up to 19 cm (7.5 in) in total length and typically mottled or banded in pinkish and green, whereas males are up to 28 cm (11 in) in total length are mostly greenish, typically with pale edging to their mouth and a pale horizontal stripe along the middle of their body. It was formerly considered a part of F. lateralis, but was recognized as a separate species in 2012.

They have three toes stuck together on one side of their foot, and on the other side, they have two stuck together toes. They rely on camouflage to catch their food with a long sticky tongue. Their tail is prehensile (Prehensile meaning: their tail can curl up like a spiral and hang onto branches) like most other chameleons in the Furcifer genus. They are arboreal, which means that they climb in trees.
