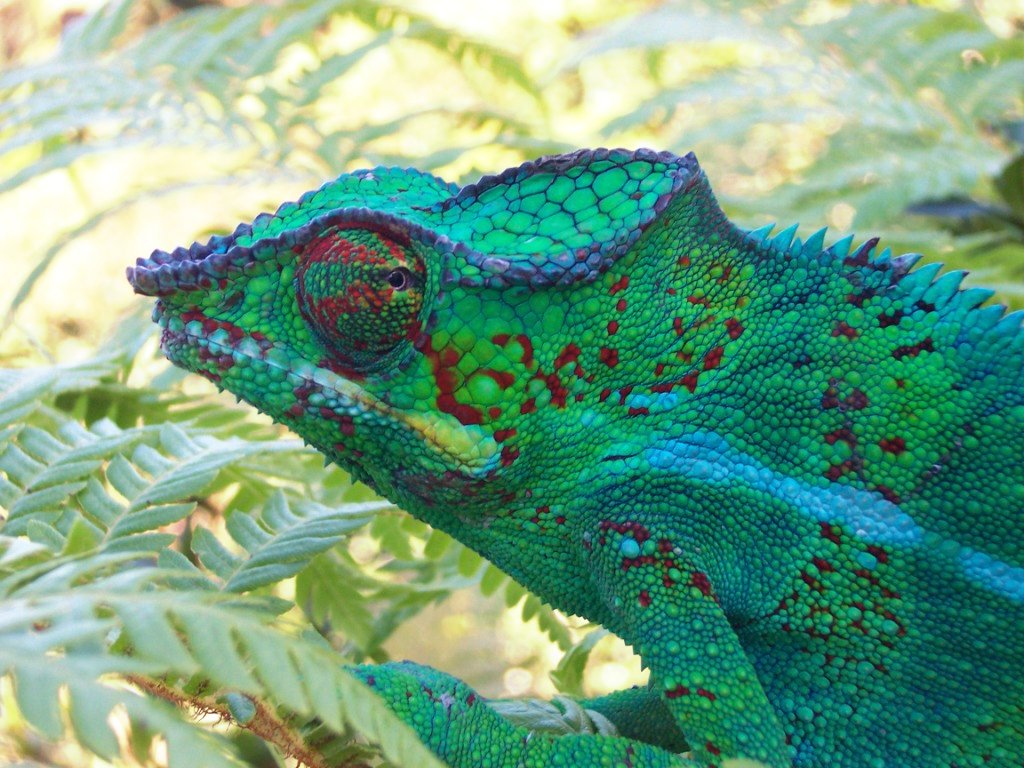
- Furcifer pardalis, panther chameleon

Scientific classification
- Kingdom: Animalia
- Phylum: Chordata
- Class: Reptilia
- Order: Squamata
- Suborder: Iguania
- Family: Chamaeleonidae
- Subfamily: Chamaeleoninae
- Genus: Furcifer; Fitzinger, 1843

Type species
- Chamaeleo bifidus Brongniart, 1800

Diversity
- 24 species

= Furcifer =

Genus of lizards

Furcifer is a genus of chameleons whose member species are mostly endemic to Madagascar, but F. cephalolepis and F. polleni are endemic to the Comoros. Additionally, F. pardalis has been introduced to Réunion, Mauritius and Florida, while F. oustaleti has been introduced to Kenya and Florida.

== Taxonomy ==
The generic name (Furcifer) is derived from the Latin root furci- meaning "forked" and refers to the shape of the animal's feet.

The genus contains 24 species.

== Species ==
The following species are recognized as being valid.

Image	Scientific name	Common name	Distribution
	Furcifer angeli (Brygoo & Domergue, 1968)	Angel's chameleon	northwest Madagascar
	Furcifer antimena (Grandidier, 1872)	Antimena chameleon	southwest Madagascar
	Furcifer balteatus (A.M.C. Duméril & Bibron, 1851)	two-banded chameleon	Madagascar
	Furcifer belalandaensis (Brygoo & Domergue, 1970)	Belalanda chameleon	Madagascar.
	Furcifer bifidus (Brongniart, 1900)	two-horned chameleon	Madagascar
	Furcifer campani (Grandidier, 1872)	jewelled chameleon	central highlands of Madagascar
	Furcifer cephalolepis (Günther, 1880)	Comoro Islands chameleon	Grande Comore.
	Furcifer labordi (Grandidier, 1872)	Labord's chameleon	Madagascar.
	Furcifer lateralis (Gray, 1831)	carpet chameleon	Madagascar.
	Furcifer major (Brygoo, 1971)	Southern Carpet Chameleon	Tanandava, Madagascar
	Furcifer minor (Günther, 1879)	lesser chameleon	Central Madagascar.
	Furcifer monoceras (Boettger, 1913)		Madagascar.
	Furcifer nicosiai Jesu, Mattioli & Schimmenti, 1999		western Madagascar.
	Furcifer oustaleti (Mocquard, 1894)	Malagasy giant chameleon	Madagascar
	Furcifer pardalis (Cuvier, 1829)	panther chameleon	eastern and northern parts of Madagascar
	Furcifer petteri (Brygoo & Domergue, 1966)	Petter's chameleon	northern Madagascar
	Furcifer polleni (W. Peters, 1874)	Mayotte chameleon	Mayotte.
	Furcifer rhinoceratus (Gray, 1845)	rhinoceros chameleon	dry forests in Madagascar.
	Furcifer timoni Glaw, Köhler & Vences, 2009	Timon's chameleon	Madagascar.
	Furcifer tuzetae (Brygoo, Bourgat & Domergue, 1972)	Ambiky chameleon	Madagascar.
	Furcifer verrucosus (Cuvier, 1829)	warty chameleon	Madagascar.
	Furcifer viridis Florio et al., 2012	green chameleon	northwest Madagascar, from the central highlands and Maevatanana to Ambanja
	Furcifer voeltzkowi (Boettger, 1893)	Voeltzkow's chameleon	Madagascar.
	Furcifer willsii (Günther, 1890)	canopy chameleon	eastern Madagascar

Nota bene: A binomial authority in parentheses indicates that the species was originally described in a genus other than Furcifer.
