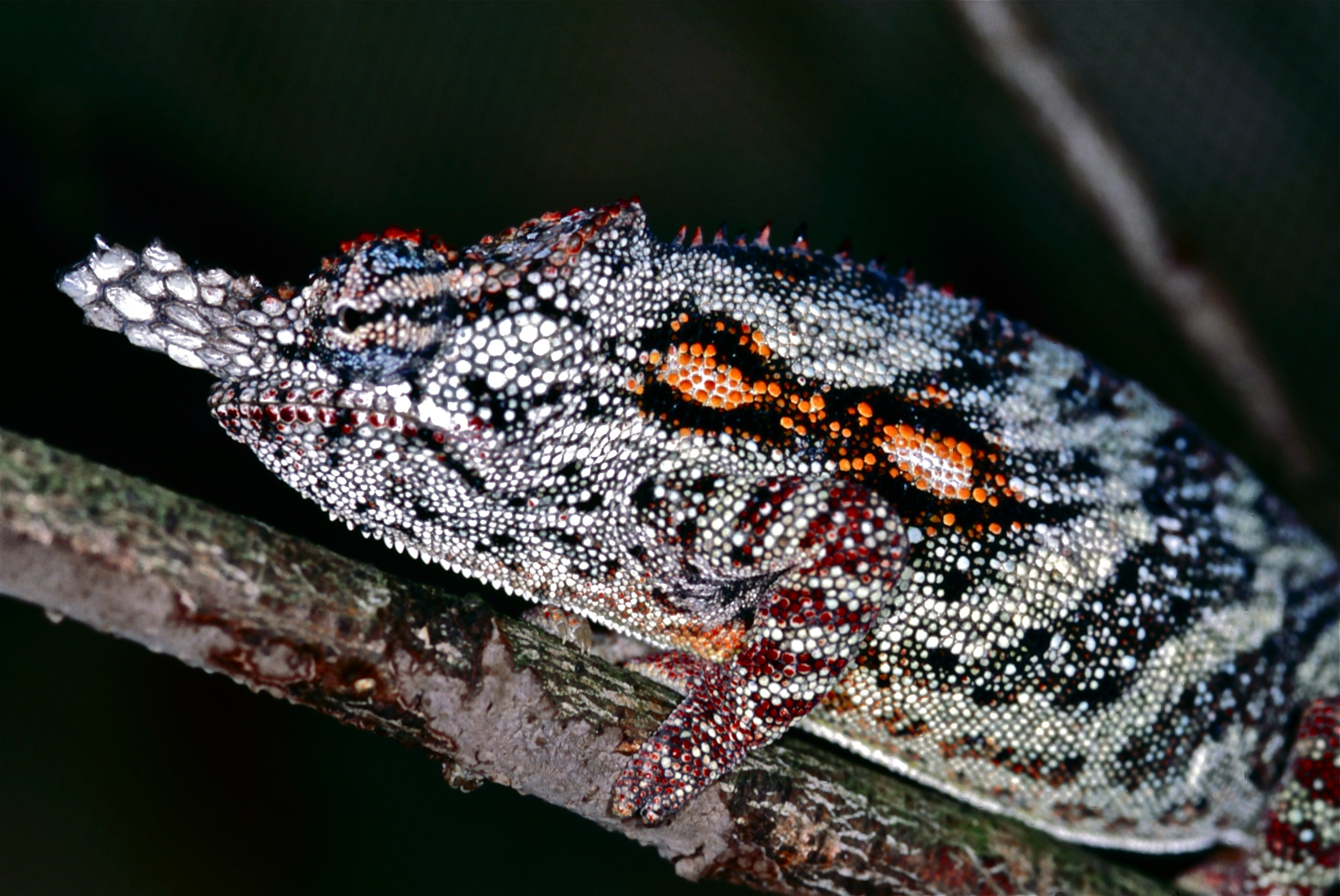
- Male
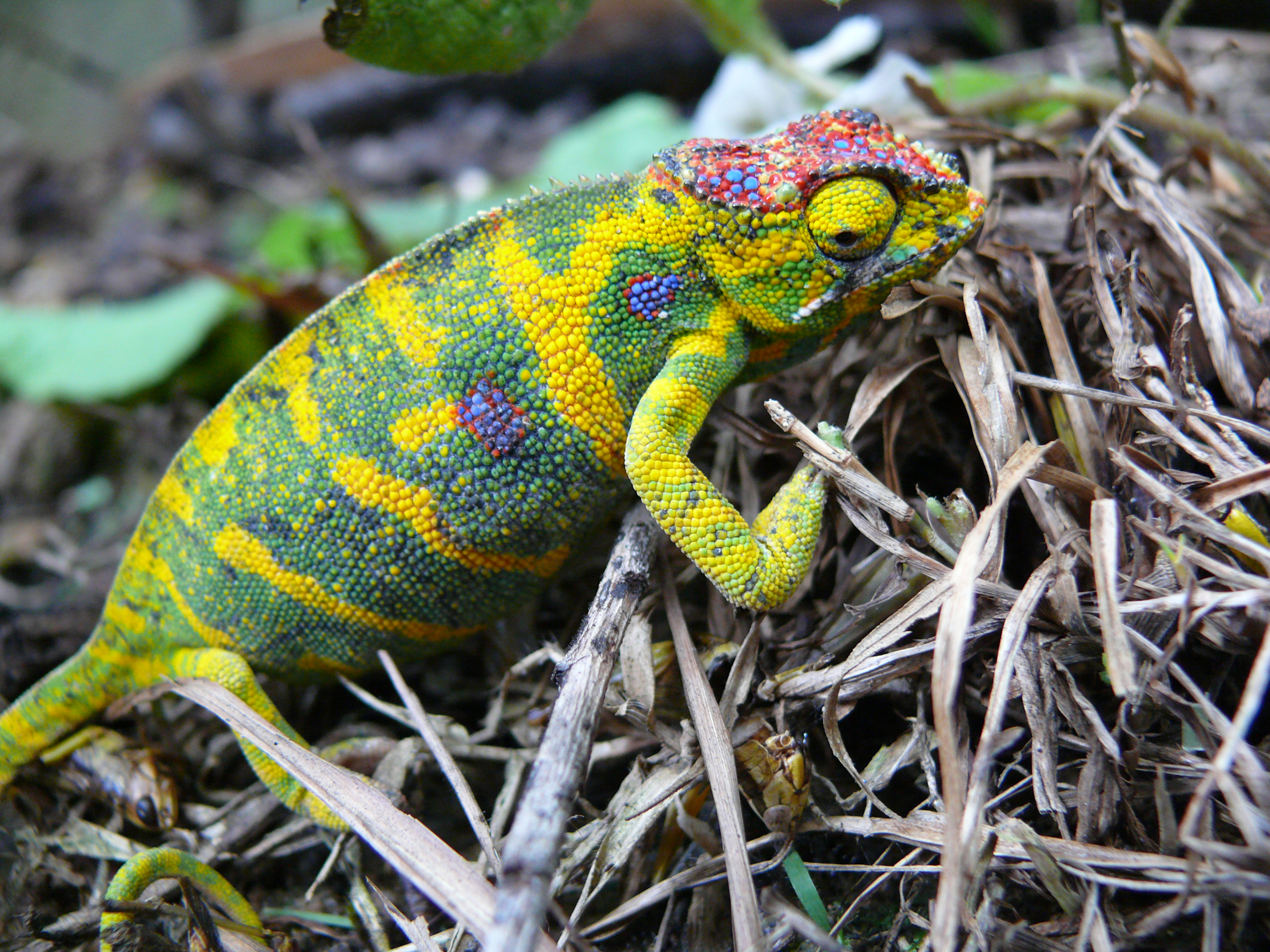
- Female

Conservation status
- Endangered (IUCN 3.1)

Scientific classification
- Kingdom: Animalia
- Phylum: Chordata
- Class: Reptilia
- Order: Squamata
- Suborder: Iguania
- Family: Chamaeleonidae
- Genus: Furcifer
- Species: F. minor

Binomial name
- Furcifer minor (Günther, 1879)
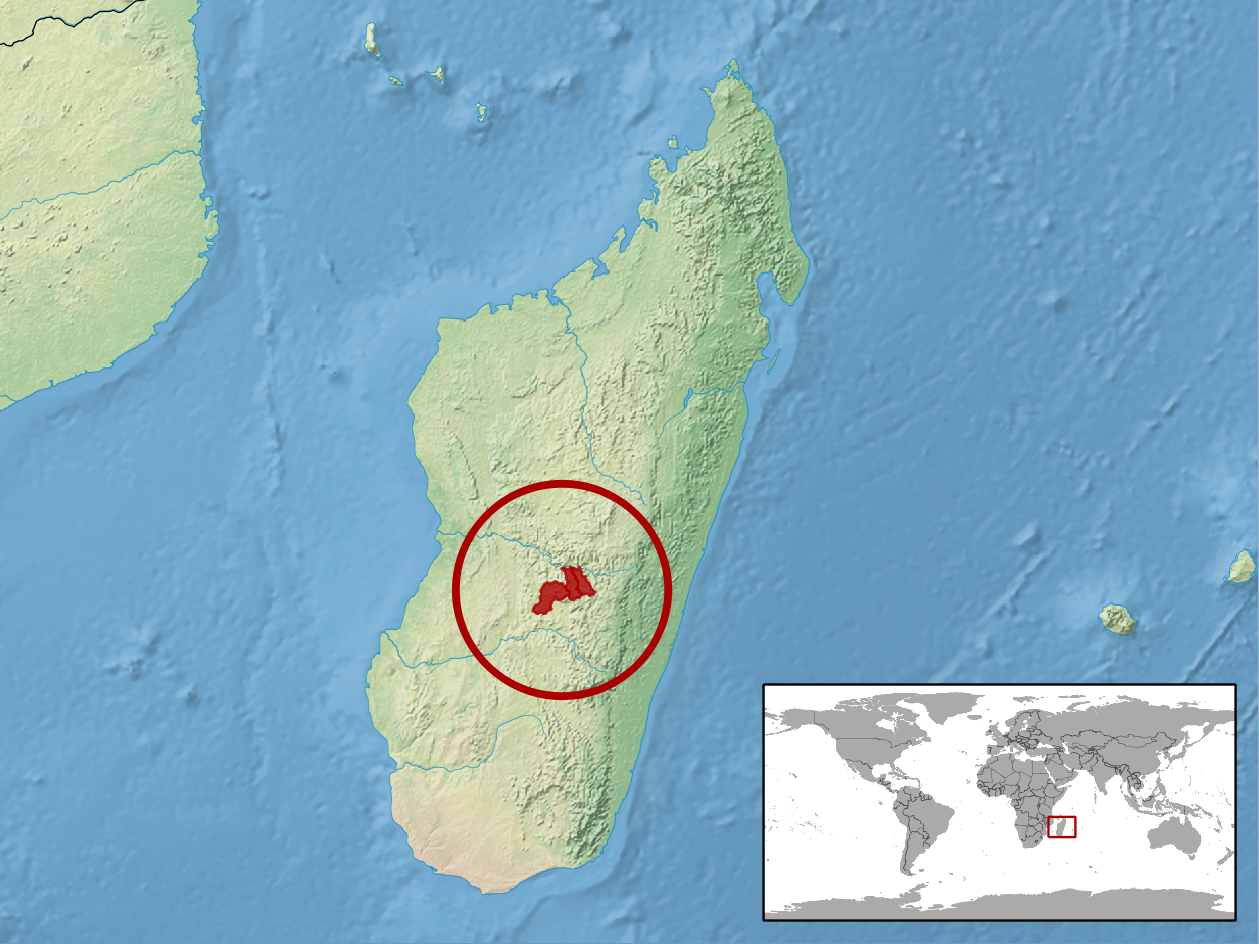

= Lesser chameleon =

Species of lizard

The lesser chameleon (Furcifer minor) or minor chameleon is a species of lizards in the family Chamaeleonidae. It is endemic to Madagascar.

== Basic information ==
The lesser chameleon lives in a dry arboreal habitat, fragmented by grasslands. Generally it leads a solitary lifestyle, often aggressive towards other members of its own species. They hunt opportunistically. Unlike most chameleons, the female is the more colourful sex, gravid females are adorned with alternating greenish-black and yellow bands and yellow speckling highlighting darker areas. Blue-Violet, Red-black spots adorn each side of its chest, whilst the lower jaw is covered in red. While resting the female has yellowish banding. Males are adorned with shades of brown, black, white and reddish-orange patterning although at display they may adopt a darker black and white banded coloration. The most noticeable feature of the male is the rostral appendage which protrudes from the end of its snout. Males may be up to 24 cm in size whilst females tend to be approximately 16 cm in size.

== Habitat ==
The lesser chameleon mainly inhabits the arboreal habitat of tapia forest, dominated by the Uapaca bojeri tree, as well as other endemic habitats such as humid montane habitats between the ranges of 1,000 and 1,650 metres above sea level in the region of Madagascar. They have also been known to colonise pastureland as well as coffee and cocoa plantations, and as a result may be more abundant in these locations. The habitat of the species has been fragmented by large swathes of unsuitable savanna grassland.

== Population ==
The species is recorded as being abundant in its unfragmented and undisturbed habitat, with a density estimate of 16.4 per hectare being recorded in these regions.

== Reproduction ==
The lesser chameleon is oviparous, with 4 to 16 eggs laid in a single clutch and in recorded captivity as many as 3 clutches have been known to be laid per year although this number is typically closer to 1 clutch per year. A dissected female contained 12 eggs measuring 12 by 7 mm. The eggs require an incubation time of 8 to 9 months at a constant temperature of 23 degrees Celsius. Sexual maturity is typically reached from between 5 and 8 months.

Once the females have completed the courtship and mating process they will display a new coloration scheme and act extremely aggressively towards males. Gestation requires 2 to 3 months and the chameleon may die during its first egg laying experience due to egg binding.

== Conservation and threats ==
It is threatened by habitat loss as a result of quartz and tourmaline mining, logging as well as the clearing of its habitat through slash-and-burn techniques for subsistence agriculture. There are signs that it appears to tolerate habitat loss, although there is a lack of basic information on its ecology to support whether these new habitats can be suitable for breeding. There is evidence that collection of the species still occurs in the Itremo region, and although its impact has yet to be studied it is estimated that it is unlikely to be a major threat to populations due to the process being highly localised and in small quantities.

In 1994, CITES reported that 1,257 lesser chameleons had been exported from Madagascar for sale on the western pet market, It was banned for export from Madagascar that same year. The lesser chameleon is currently listed in Appendix II of CITES, limiting trade in this species. Part of its range in Itremo is currently in the process of being protected.
