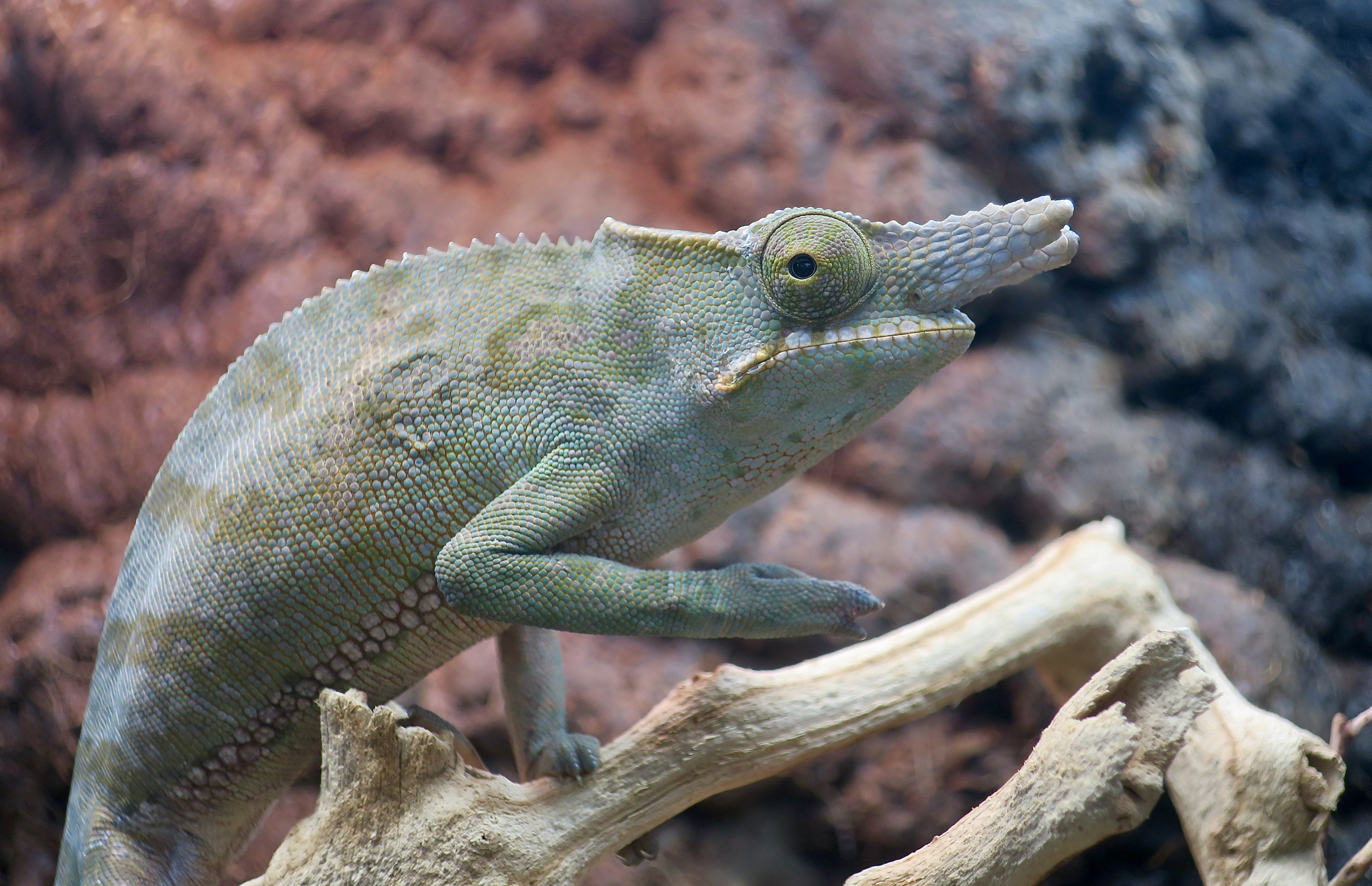

Conservation status
- Least Concern (IUCN 3.1)

Scientific classification
- Kingdom: Animalia
- Phylum: Chordata
- Class: Reptilia
- Order: Squamata
- Suborder: Iguania
- Family: Chamaeleonidae
- Genus: Furcifer
- Species: F. bifidus

Binomial name
- Furcifer bifidus Brongniart, 1800
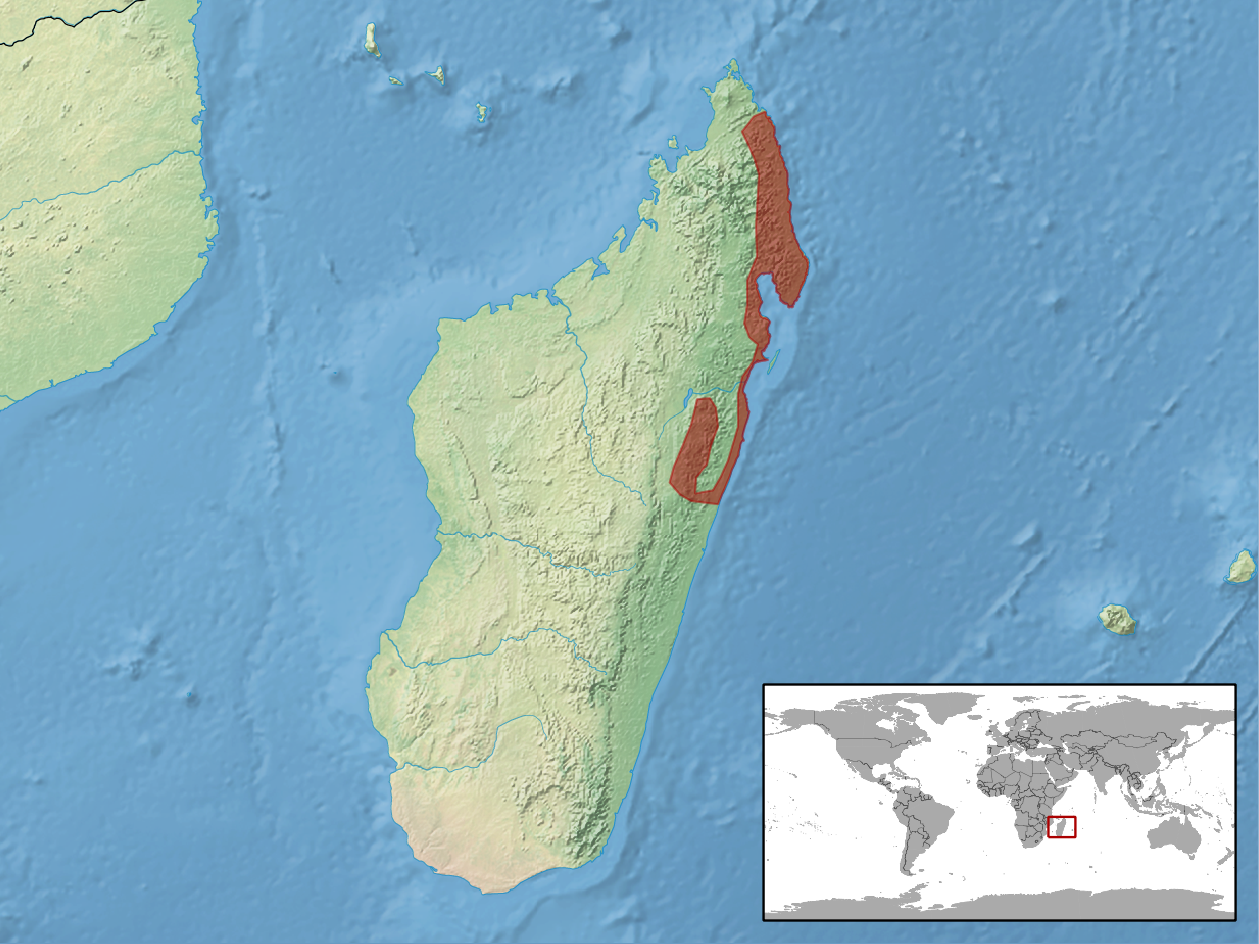

Synonyms
- Dicranosaura bifurca var. crassicornis (Gray, 1865); Chamaeleo bifurcus (Kuhl, 1820); Chamaeleo bifurcatus (Swainson, 1839); Chamaeleo bifidus (Duméril & Bibron, 1836); Dicranosaura bifurca var. crassirostris (Brygoo, 1971); Furcifer bifidus (Glaw & Vences, 1994); Furcifer bifidus (Necas, 1999)

= Furcifer bifidus =

Species of lizard

Furcifer bifidus, also known as the fork-nosed chameleon, is a species of chameleon that is endemic to Madagascar. It was described by Alexandre Brongniart in 1800. The International Union for Conservation of Nature have ranked this species of chameleon as Least Concern.

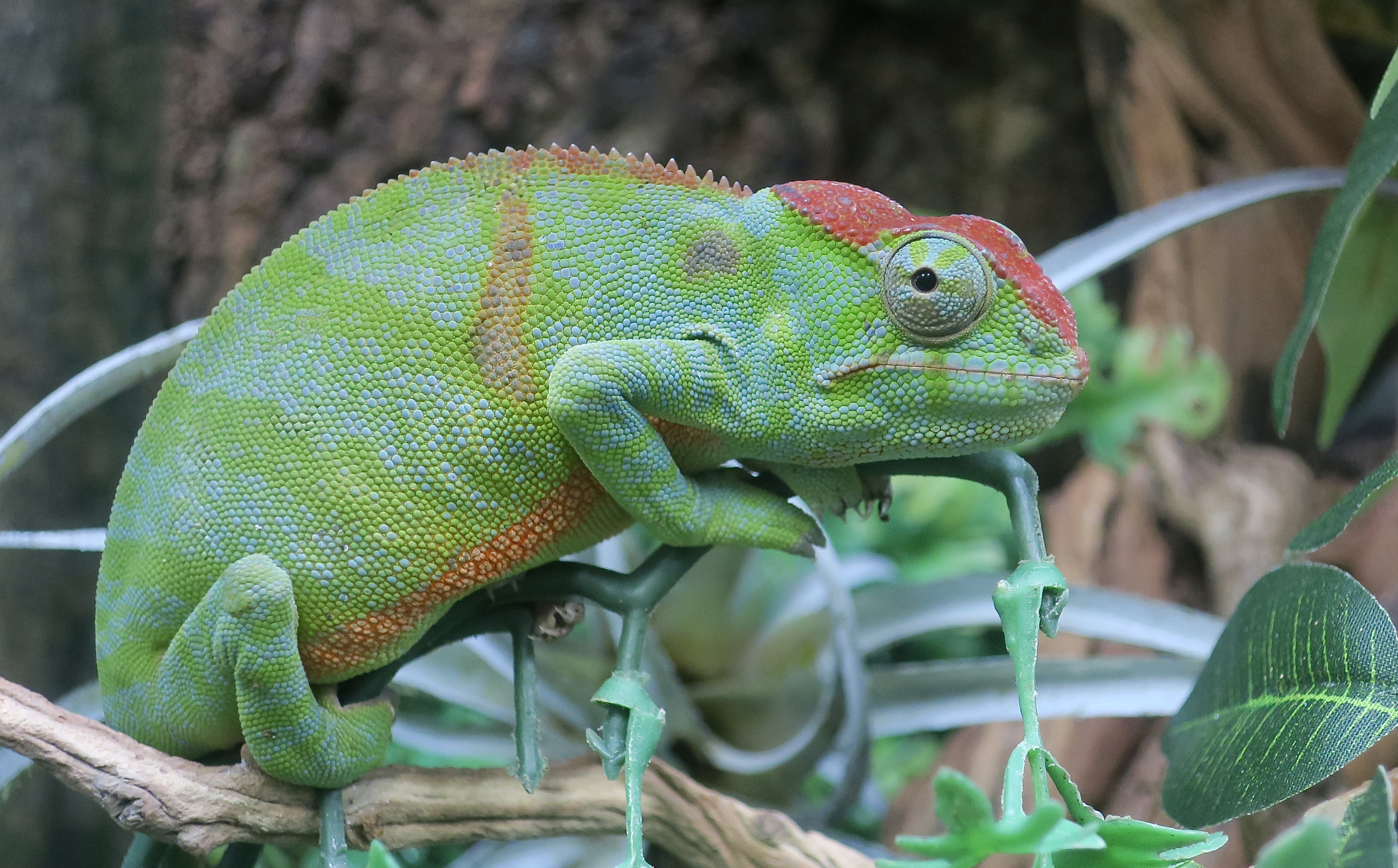
A female at LLL Reptiles, a reptile store in Henderson, Nevada.

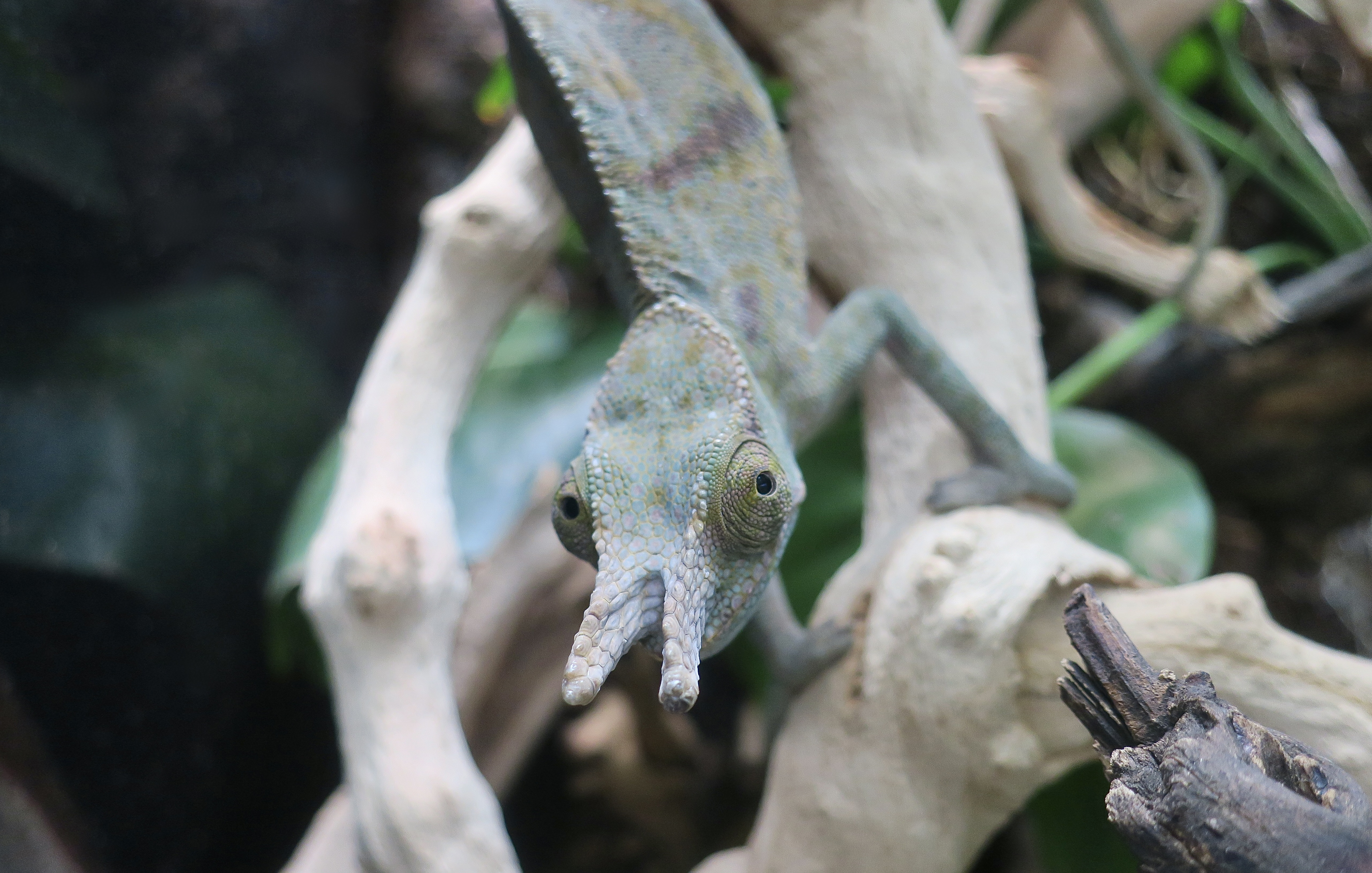
Front view of a male's horns at LLL Reptiles, a reptile store in Las Vegas.

== Distribution and habitat ==
Furcifer bifidus is found in east Madagascar, and there is no known type locality. According to the International Union for Conservation of Nature (IUCN), it can be found over an area of 35,368 square kilometres (13,656 square miles), and is therefore ranked as a Least Concern species of animal, although it is exposed to many threats. It can be found on the east of Madagascar north after the Mangoro River, and as far as Daraina and Marojejy National Park (Marojejy Massif). It has been found at a highest of 700 metres (2,300 feet) above sea level. The two major threats to the Furcifer bifidus are logging for commercial reasons and the slash-and-burn method in agriculture. The species has been listed as protected.

== Taxonomy ==
Furcifer bifidus was initially described by French chemist, mineralogist, and zoologist Alexandre Brongniart in 1800.
