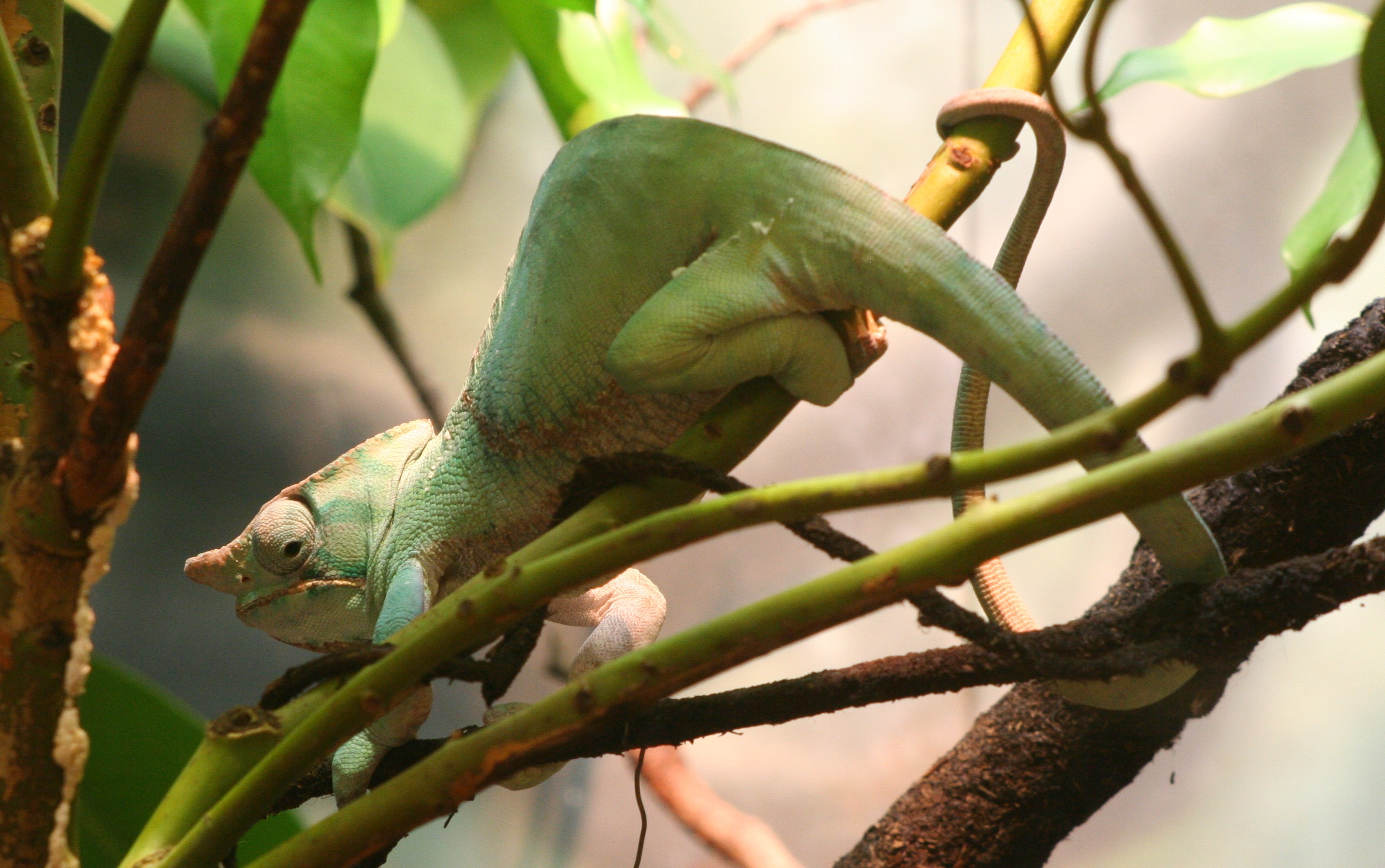
- Furcifer balteatus at Buffalo Zoo

Conservation status
- Endangered (IUCN 3.1)

Scientific classification
- Kingdom: Animalia
- Phylum: Chordata
- Class: Reptilia
- Order: Squamata
- Suborder: Iguania
- Family: Chamaeleonidae
- Genus: Furcifer
- Species: F. balteatus

Binomial name
- Furcifer balteatus Duméril & Bibron, 1851
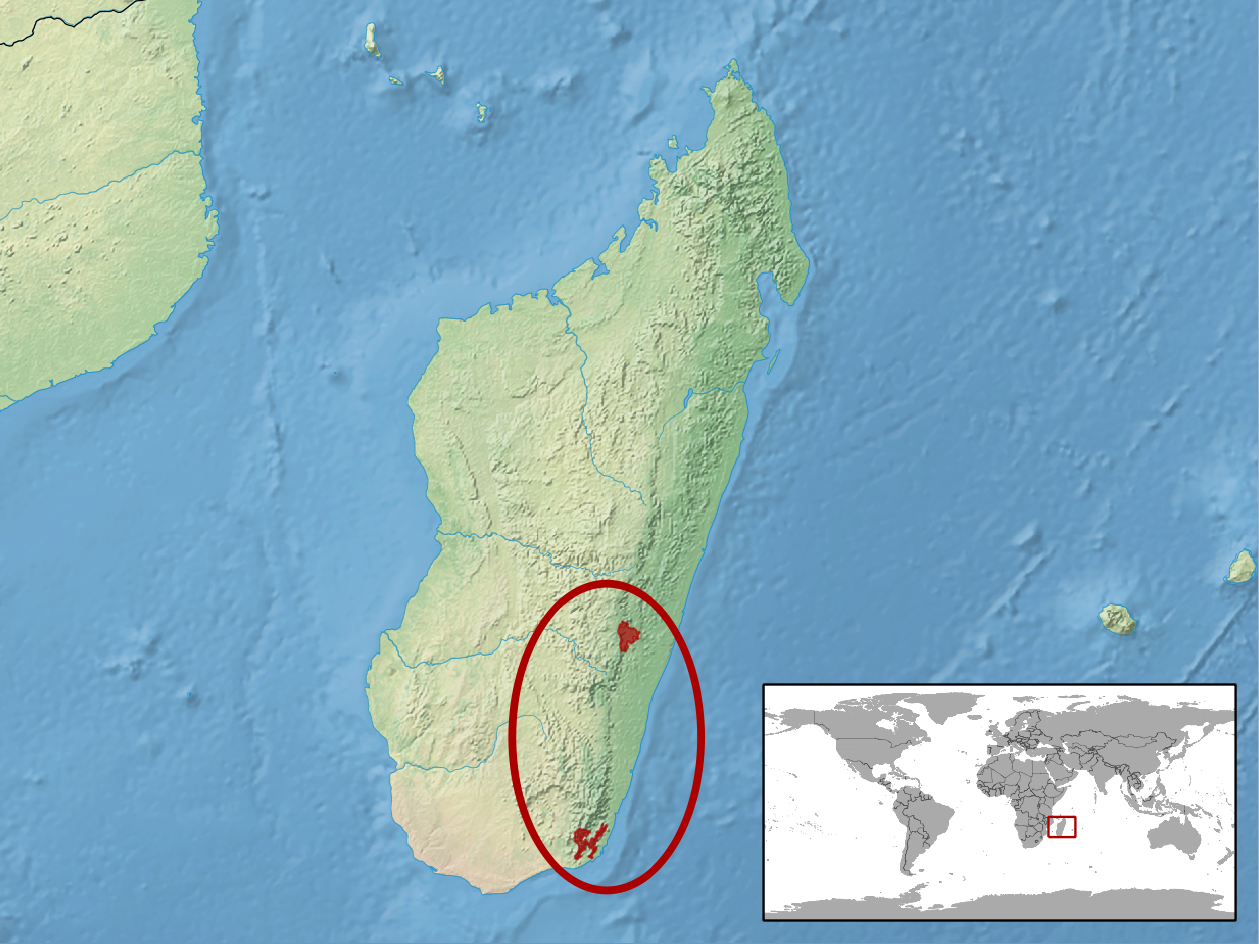

Synonyms
- Chamaeleo balteatus Duméril & Bibron, 1851

= Two-banded chameleon =

Species of lizard

Furcifer balteatus, also known as the two-banded chameleon or the rainforest chameleon, is a species of chameleon that is endemic to Madagascar. It was described by André Marie Constant Duméril and Gabriel Bibron in 1851.

== Distribution and habitat ==
Furcifer balteatus is endemic to southeast Madagascar. It can be found in Ranomafana where the average temperature is between 14 and 20 degrees Celsius (57 and 68 degrees Fahrenheit) and the rainfall is roughly 4,000 millimetres (160 inches) per annum. It has been found over an estimated area of 1,971 square kilometres (761 square miles) but has a "patchy distribution" and is believed by the International Union for Conservation of Nature to be decreasing in population. Most sightings were at a height of 800 to 1,050 metres (2,620 to 3,440 ft) above sea level but some were at lower altitudes. It is a rare species and most of the sightings were of single individuals. Some surveys have failed to locate any individuals and it is ranked as an Endangered species by the IUCN. The major threat to this species is degradation of its forest habitat. It is a CITES-listed species and export from Madagascar has been banned since 1994. Nevertheless, it is believed to be highly desirable to the pet trade and illegal exports are a threat.

== Description ==
Though basically green, Furcifer balteatus is variable in colour and is well camouflaged in its arboreal surroundings. It often has darker green diagonal stripes with paler bands between and usually has a characteristic buff-coloured diagonal streak. The body length can be as much as 24 cm (9 in) and the tail as least as long again. The males have a pair of horny projections 1.5 cm (0.6 in) long on their heads. It is commonly known as the two-banded chameleon or the rainforest chameleon.

== Taxonomy ==
The species was initially described in Duméril & Duméril 1851: 32 by Duméril and Bibron. It was described as the Dicranosaura bifurca var. crassicornis by Gray in 1865, and then as Chamaeleon balteatus in 1865: 347 by the same person. It was next described by Angel in 1942 as Chamaeleo balteus. Werner in 1911: 27 later described it under Chamaeleon bifidus, and then it was described as Chamaeleo bifidus fifty-five years later in Mertens 1966. Brygoo and Domergue described it as Chamaeleo balteatus in 1969, and then Brygoo described it under the same name in 1971 and 1978. In 1986, it became known as the Furcifer balteatus. Klaver and Böhme described it as this in 1986, and it was later described under the same name by Glaw and Vences in 1994. Furcifer balteatus was most recently described by Necas in 1999 as Furcifer balteatus.

== Gallery ==
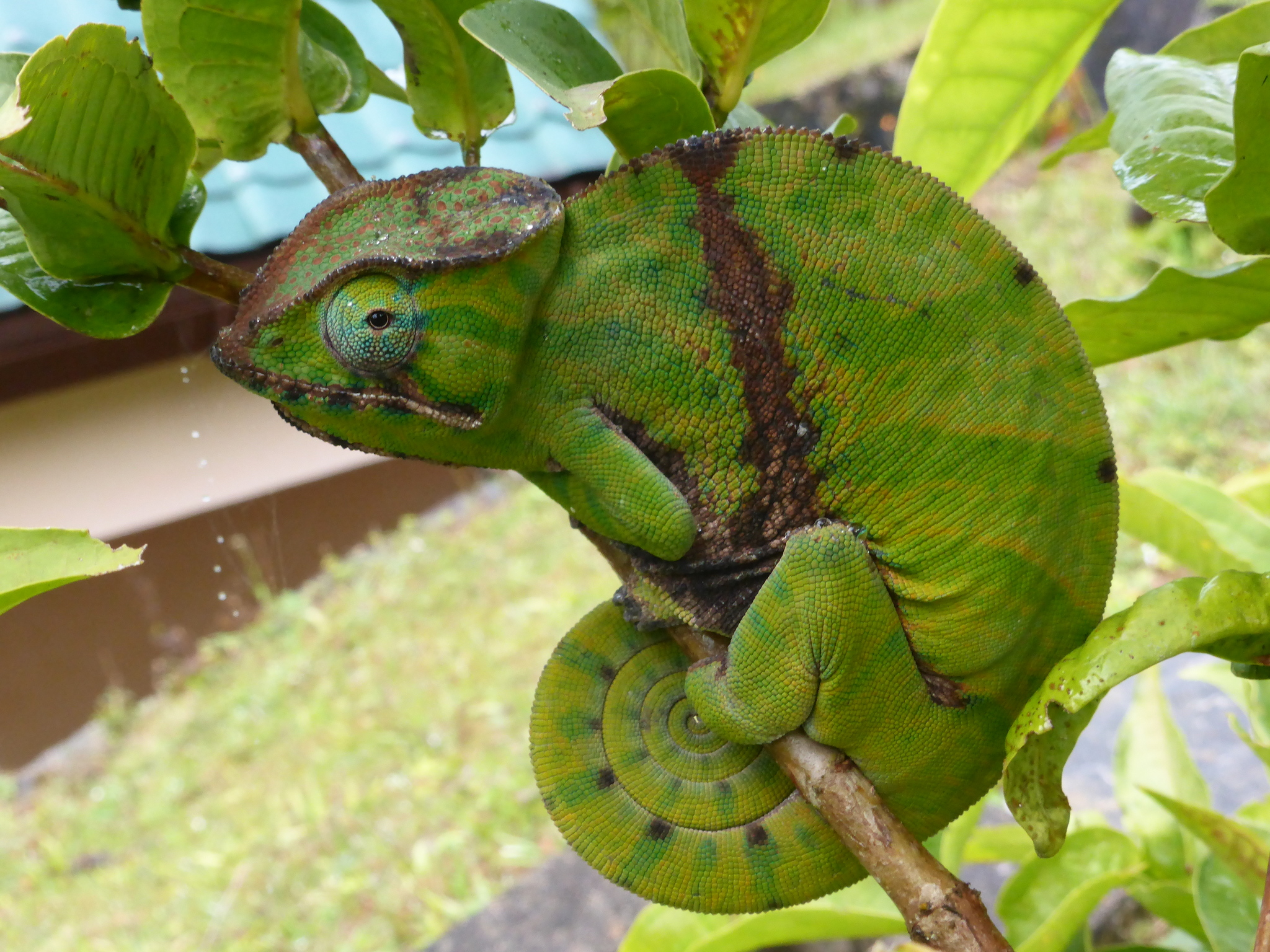
Furcifer balteatus found in Haute Matsiatra, Madagascar

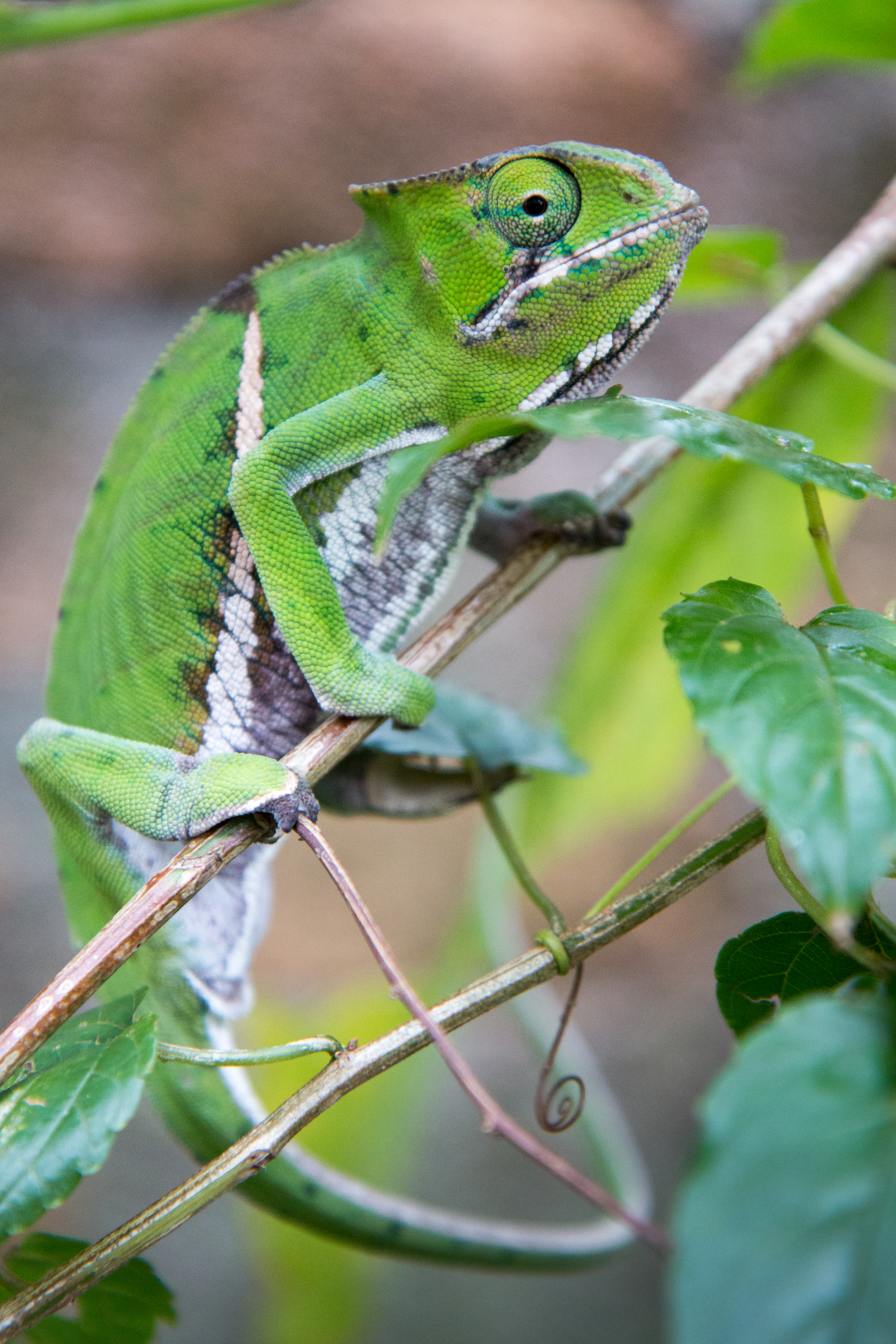

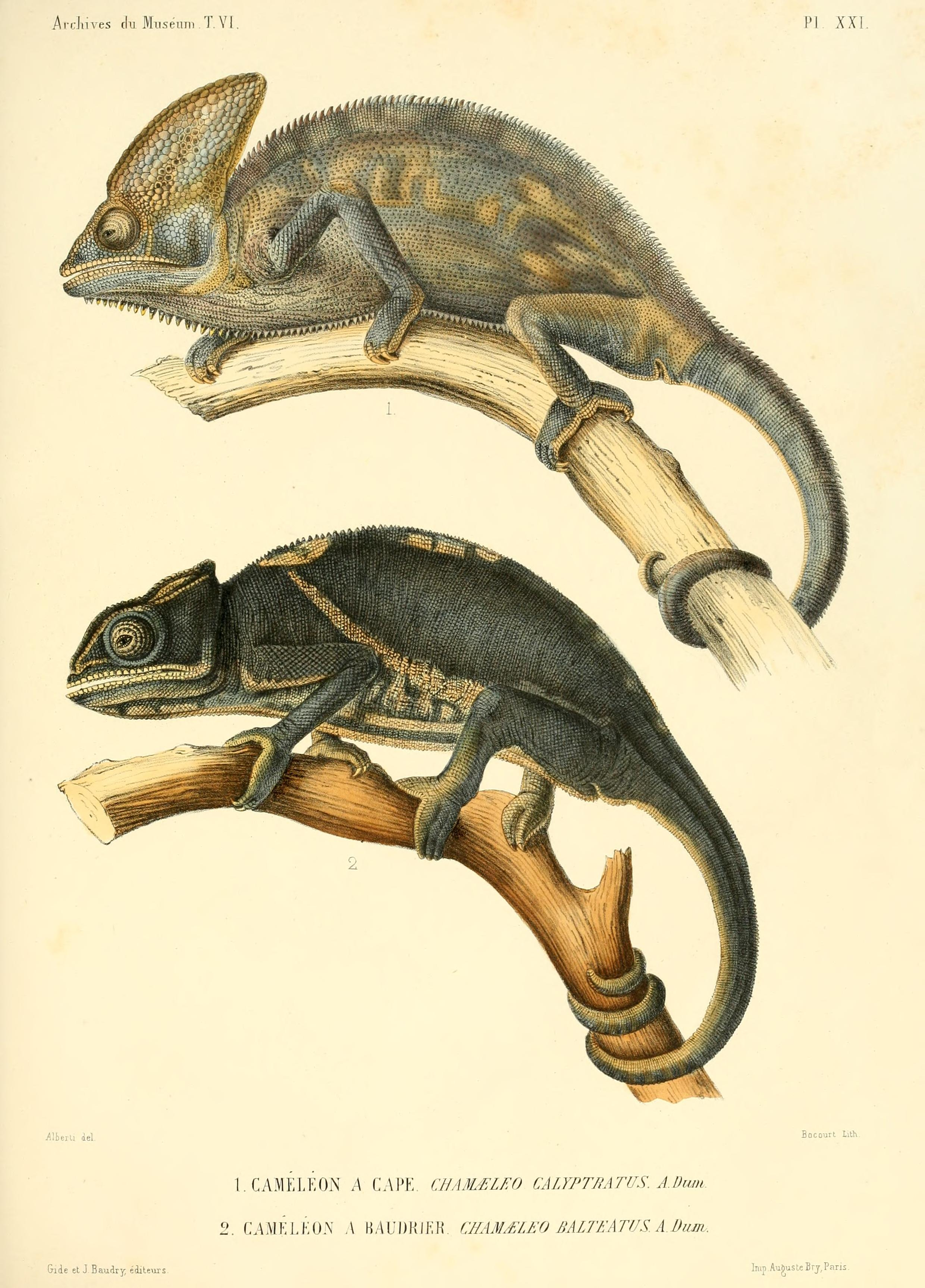
An 1852 illustration of Furcifer balteatus by Auguste Duméril (bottom)
