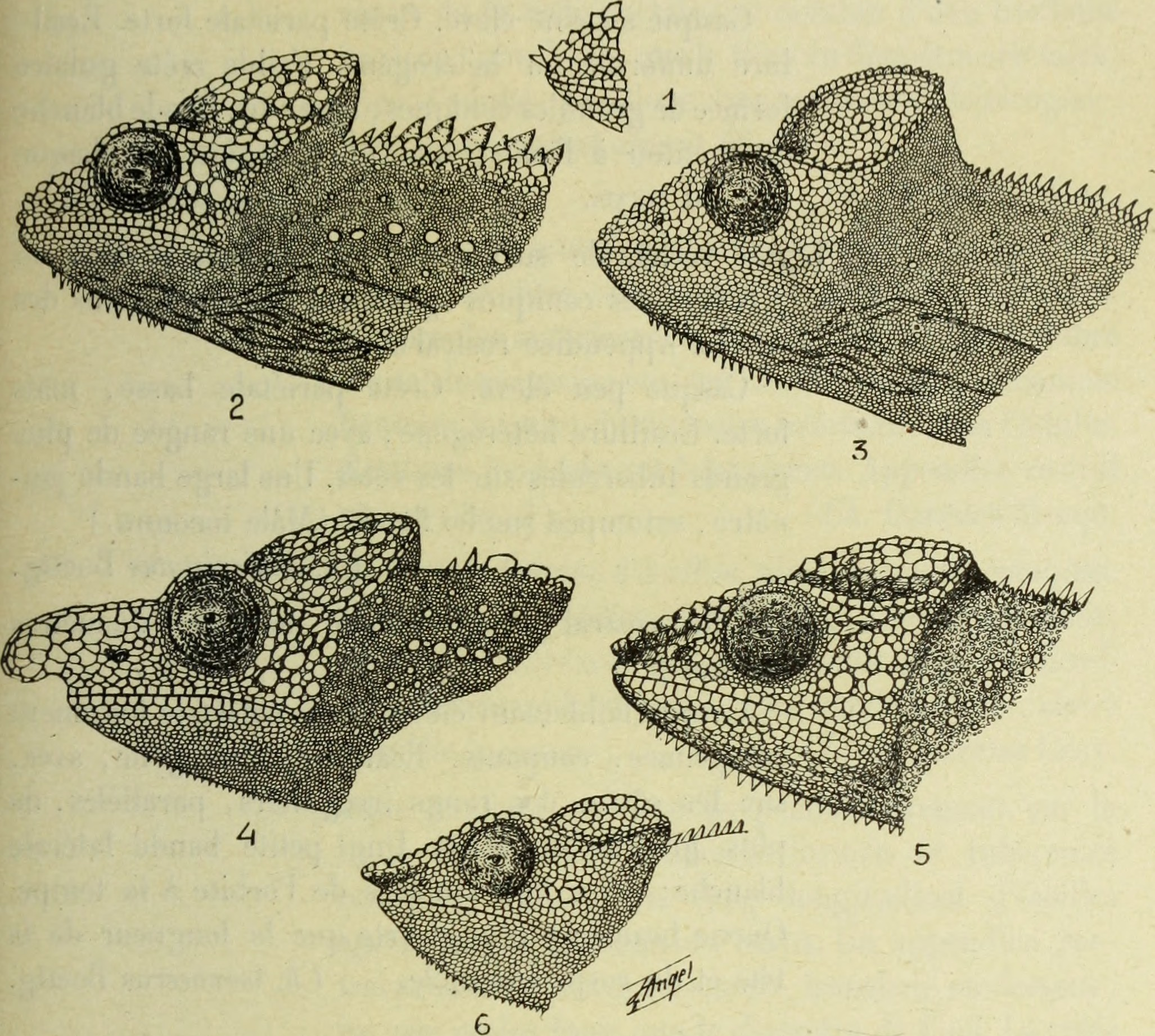
- Furcifer cephalolepis (illustration 1 at top, only showing nose)

Conservation status
- Least Concern (IUCN 3.1)

Scientific classification
- Kingdom: Animalia
- Phylum: Chordata
- Class: Reptilia
- Order: Squamata
- Suborder: Iguania
- Family: Chamaeleonidae
- Genus: Furcifer
- Species: F. cephalolepis

Binomial name
- Furcifer cephalolepis Günther, 1880
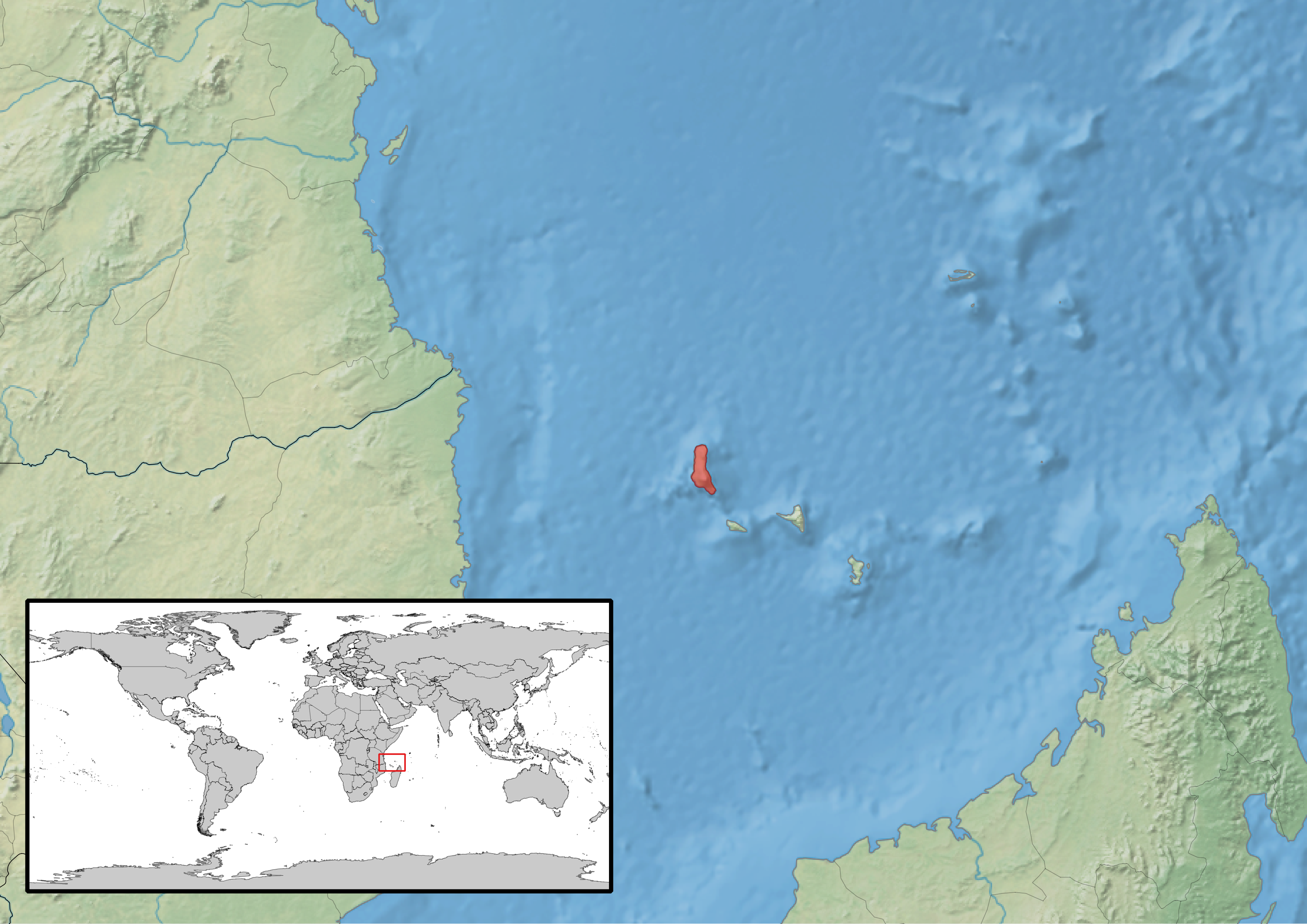

Synonyms
- Chamaeleon cephalolepis (Günther, 1880)

= Furcifer cephalolepis =

Species of lizard

Furcifer cephalolepis is a species of chameleon that is endemic to Grande Comore. It was described by Günther in 1880. The International Union for Conservation of Nature ranked the species as Least Concern on the IUCN Red List of Threatened Species as there are no signs that this species is in decline. Furcifer cephalolepis is used in the pet trade, with 8,583 specimens being exported from Grande Comore between 2004 and 2008.

== Distribution and habitat ==
Furcifer cephalolepis is native to Grande Comore (Ngazidja) in the Comoros Islands. It is believed to cover the whole of Grande Comore (Ngazidja), 1,146 square kilometres (442 square miles), although the true coverage of the species is unknown and has not been recorded. It was ranked as Least Concern by the International Union for Conservation of Nature (IUCN) in their Red List of Threatened Species (Red List Data). Despite covering a small area and the fact that it has been used in the pet trade, the species is ranked as Least Concern (LC) because there are no signs that the population of the Furcifer cephalolepis are currently in decline. The population has been confirmed to be stable. It is found in humid regions around the coast of Grande Comore and in forests in and around towns. Between 1994 and 2003, an estimated 7,150 specimens of this chameleon were exported. Between 2004 and 2008, 8,583 living specimens of Furcifer cephalolepis were exported to be kept as pets from Grande Comore. The number of individuals of this species sold in the pet market is controlled.

== Taxonomy ==
Furcifer cephalolepis was initially described by Günther in 1880: 237 as Chamaeleon cephalolepis. It was later described under the name of Furcifer cephalolepis in 1999 by Necas: 210.
