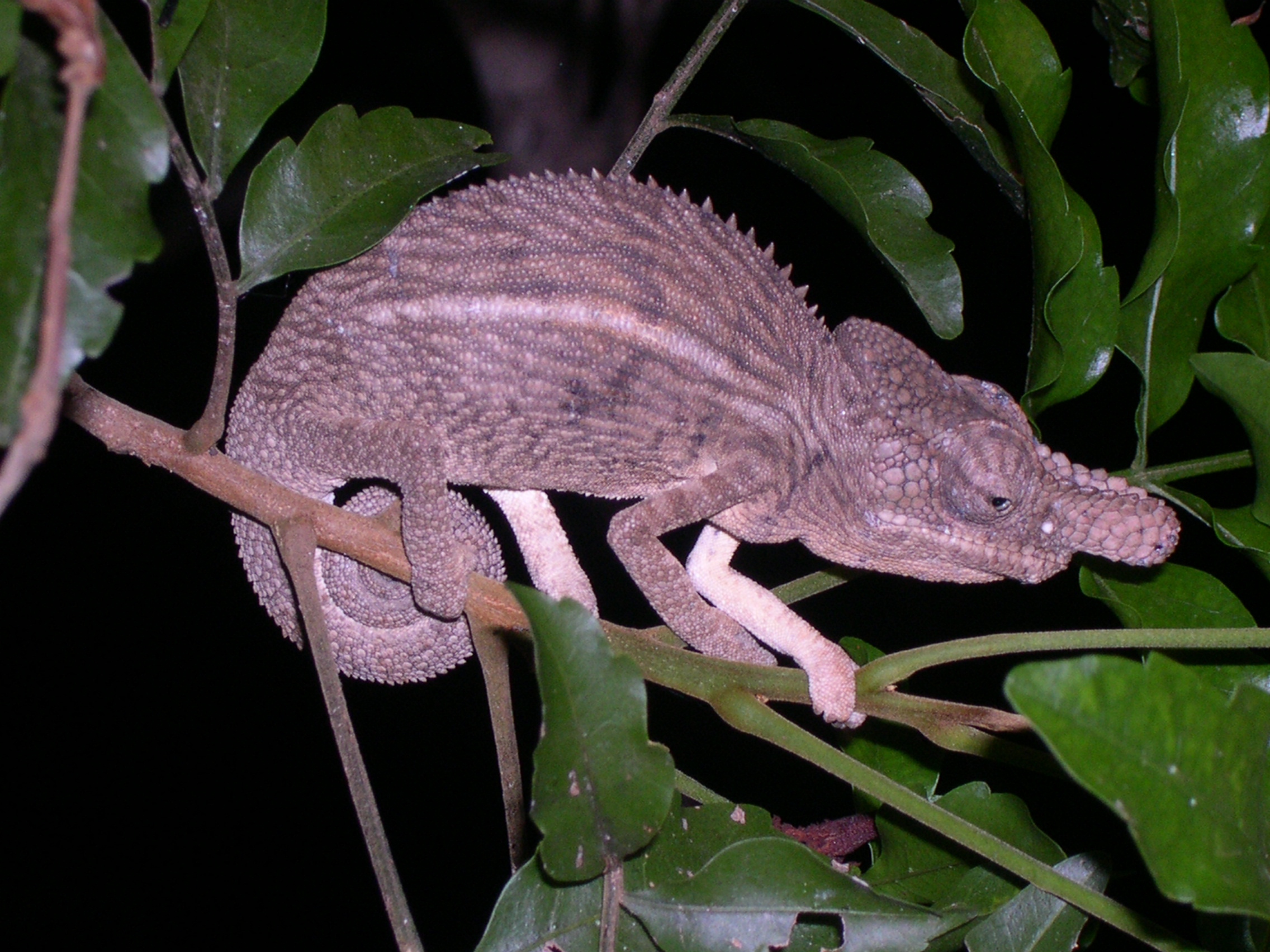
- male

Conservation status
- Vulnerable (IUCN 3.1)

Scientific classification
- Kingdom: Animalia
- Phylum: Chordata
- Class: Reptilia
- Order: Squamata
- Suborder: Iguania
- Family: Chamaeleonidae
- Genus: Furcifer
- Species: F. rhinoceratus

Binomial name
- Furcifer rhinoceratus (JE Gray, 1845)
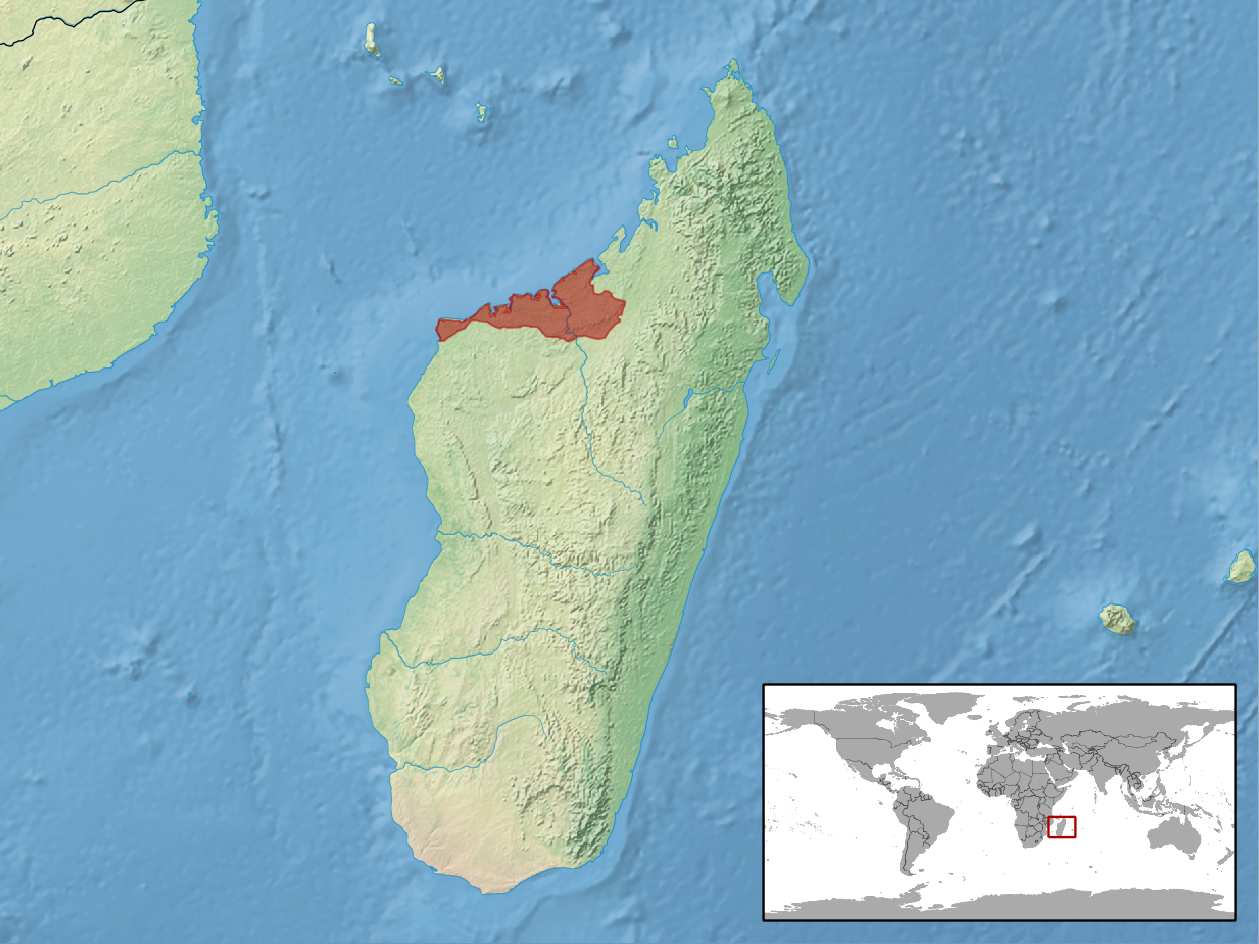

Synonyms
- Chamaeleon rhinoceratus Gray 1845; Chamaeleon monoceras Boettger, 1913; Furcifer monoceras (Boettger, 1913)

= Rhinoceros chameleon =

Species of lizard

The rhinoceros chameleon (Furcifer rhinoceratus) is a species of chameleon that gets its common name from its horn-like nose which is most prominent in males. It is endemic to dry forests in Madagascar.

== Description ==
The male rhinoceros chameleon can grow to about 27 centimetres (11 in), about twice as big as the female. The male's proboscis-like snout projects forward above its mouth and gives it its common name. The female has a smaller snout. On the top of the head there is a small crest of triangular, projecting scales, and a further crest runs part way along the spine. The general colour is grey or light brown with a few darker-coloured transverse bars. The snout is often bluish, the lips pale and a white line runs down each side of the animal. Females are similar in colour but when they are carrying eggs, they turn purple with black bands and an orange or red tail.

== Distribution ==
The rhinoceros chameleon is endemic to dry forests in western Madagascar. Its range extends from the Ankarafantsika National Park in the north west to Soalala in the south west but many of the sightings in the middle of its range were made a long time ago and it is unclear whether it is still to be found in these locations.

== Biology ==
The rhinoceros chameleon is usually a tree-dweller and catches insects by flicking out its sticky tongue with great rapidity. The male guards a territory and probably uses his long snout to do battle with other males. Little is known of the breeding habits of this chameleon but in captivity the female lays clutches of four to eleven eggs which take about forty one weeks to hatch into miniature chameleons.

== Status ==
The rhinoceros chameleon is listed as being "Vulnerable" in the IUCN Red List of Threatened Species. This is because it lives in deciduous forests in the dry west of the island which are being logged to make way for cattle grazing and for the manufacture of charcoal. It should be protected from these threats in the Ankarafantsika National Park but elsewhere is more vulnerable. It is also at risk from bush fires. It has always been an uncommon species but it seems likely that its numbers are in decline. It is unclear whether it is able to adapt to degraded habitats but it may be somewhat adaptable as it is sometimes seen beside paths and roads.
