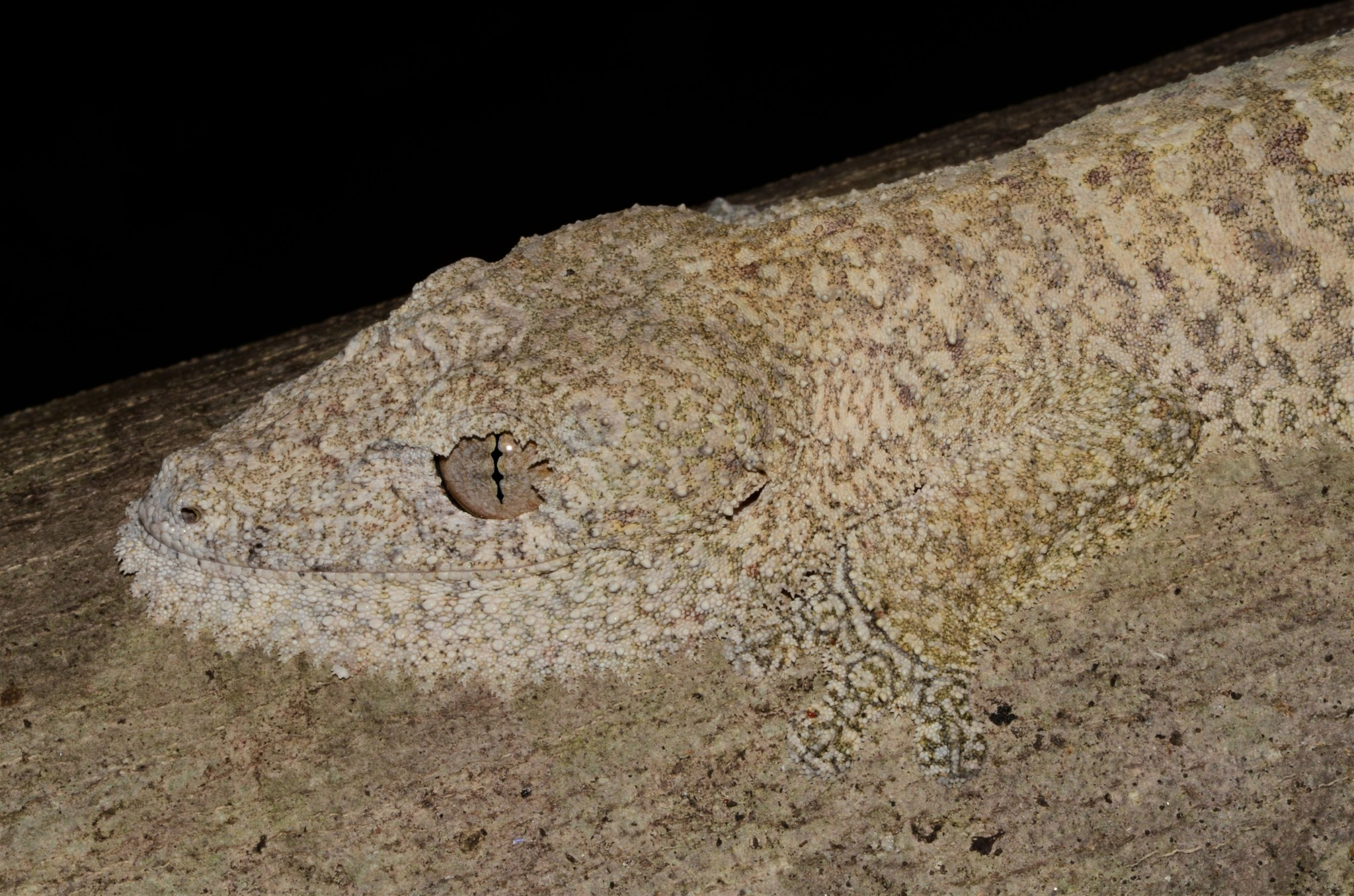

Scientific classification
- Kingdom: Animalia
- Phylum: Chordata
- Class: Reptilia
- Order: Squamata
- Suborder: Gekkota
- Family: Gekkonidae
- Genus: Uroplatus
- Species: U. garamaso

Binomial name
- Uroplatus garamaso Glaw, Köhler, Ratsoavina, Raselimanana, Crottini, Gehring, Böhme, Scherz & Vences, 2023

= Uroplatus garamaso =

Species of lizard

Uroplatus garamaso is a species of lizard in the family Gekkonidae. It is endemic to northern Madagascar.

== Taxonomy ==
Uroplatus garamaso was originally not recognized as a distinct species from Henkel's leaf-tailed gecko, being referred to as a population of the latter species for decades. Though recognized as a distinct genetic lineage in 2007, it would not be taxonomically assessed until 2023 when U. garamaso was described as a separate species based on DNA sequencing and external morphology. The specific name contains the Malagasy word maso (meaning 'eye'), in reference to the lizard's distinct eye color.

Based on molecular phylogenetic relationships and general appearance, U. garamaso is placed into the U. fimbriatus group as the sister species to U. henkeli.

== Description ==
Like other member of the genus Uroplatus (commonly known as leaf-tail geckos), U. garamaso has a wide, flattened tail similar in shape to a leaf. With a snout-vent length of 83–139 mm, it is smaller than the related Henkel's leaf-tailed gecko, and also has more extensive yellow-red coloring in the iris as well as an unpigmented tongue tip (as opposed to the black tongue tip of the Henkel's leaf-tailed gecko). Body color is highly variable within this species, with grey to brown base color and darker reticulated patterns, and some individuals may have large areas of uniform light color.

== Biology ==
Uroplatus garamaso is endemic to northern Madagascar, with known locations including Montagne d'Ambre National Park, Analamerana, Ankarana, Montagne des Français and likely Antsolipa, where it occurs in deciduous dry forests (both in pristine forest and more degraded areas around plantations). In some areas (such as Montagne d'Ambre), it lives alongside the spearpoint leaf-tail gecko, giant leaf-tail gecko, mossy leaf-tailed gecko and northern leaf-tailed gecko, as well as Uroplatus finiavana at lower elevations, but in Antsolipa it is the only observed Uroplatus species.

This reptile is an arboreal and nocturnal species, being active at night on tree trunks and branches around 1 to 4 meters above the ground. It is known to actively crawl in search of prey, which includes insects.

Breeding behaviour of this species is known from reports of captive individuals, though many such reports were made before Uroplatus garamaso was recognized as a distinct species and thus refer to it as Uroplatus henkeli. However, some have been determined to most likely be referring to this species. Like other Uroplatus species, this gecko is oviparous, with the females reported to lay up to eight clutches in a season, each made up of one or two spherical eggs about 14 to 16 mm in diameter, at approximately 4-week intervals. Eggs are laid on the ground under leaves or logs, and may hatch from 70 to as long as 174 days after being laid, with lower temperatures prolonging the incubation time. These incubation conditions differ little from those of U. henkeli.

== Captivity ==
Since at least 2001 (and possibly much longer), Uroplatus garamaso has been in the pet trade under a wide variety of names including 'Diego Suarez Henkeli' and 'Uroplatus aff. henkeli'. It is reported to be imported in low numbers to the US (about 3 to 5 individuals per year since 2010), and is also present in the German pet trade. Because the species has been kept in captivity since before it was recognized as distinct from Henkel's leaf-tailed gecko, it is possible the two species have been unknowingly interbred and hybridized during the selection of breeding groups. Breeders of the geckos have been recommended to inspect the lizards carefully to correctly identify their species and avoid crossbreeding, which can be done by inspecting the mouth and tongue color, so that captive populations can be as species-pure as possible. As hybridization between Henkel's leaf-tailed gecko and the more distantly-related common flat-tail gecko is known, it is assumed that crossbreeding between the former and its sister species U. garamaso is possible.

== Threats ==
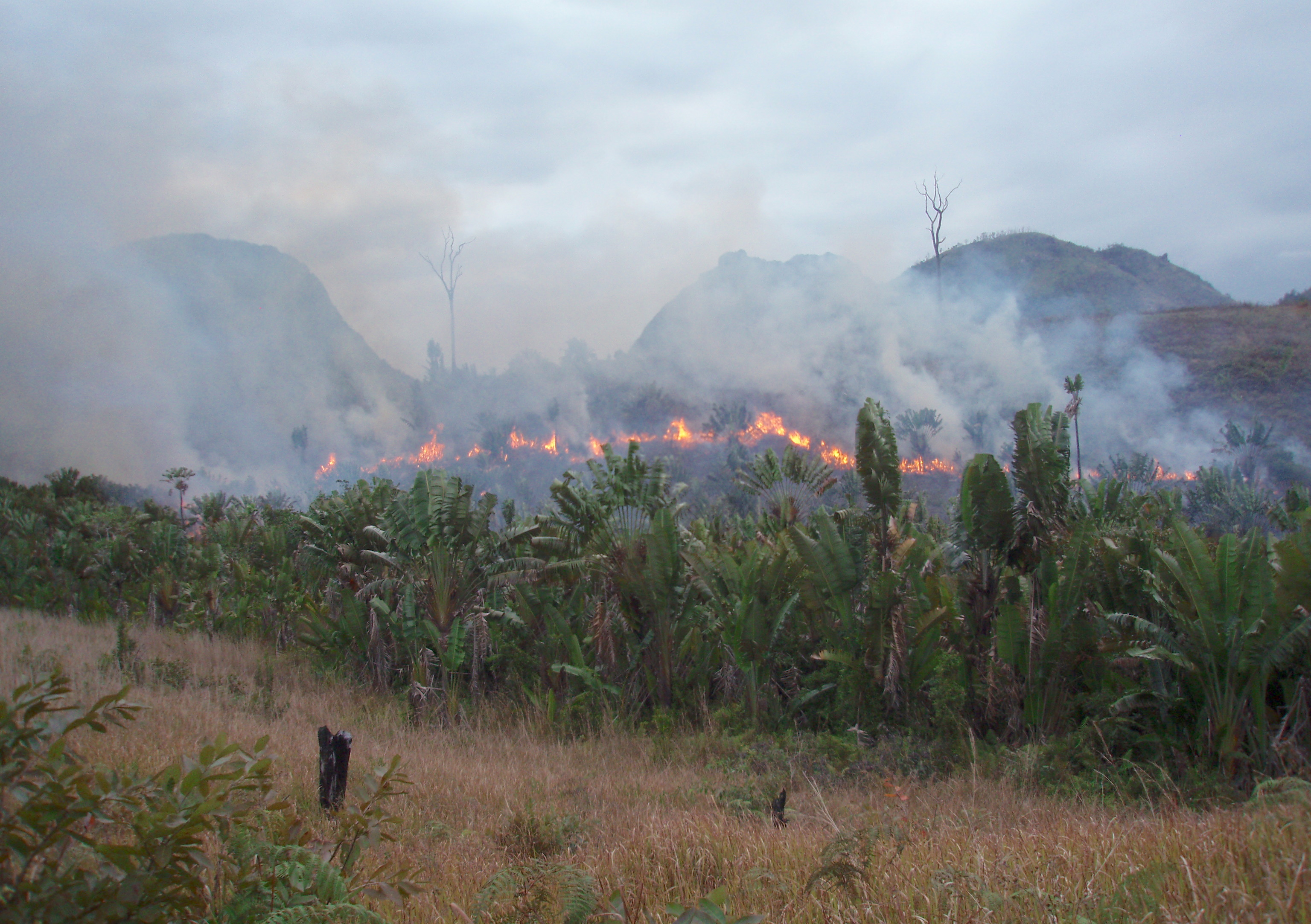
Illegal slash and burn practice in Madagascar.

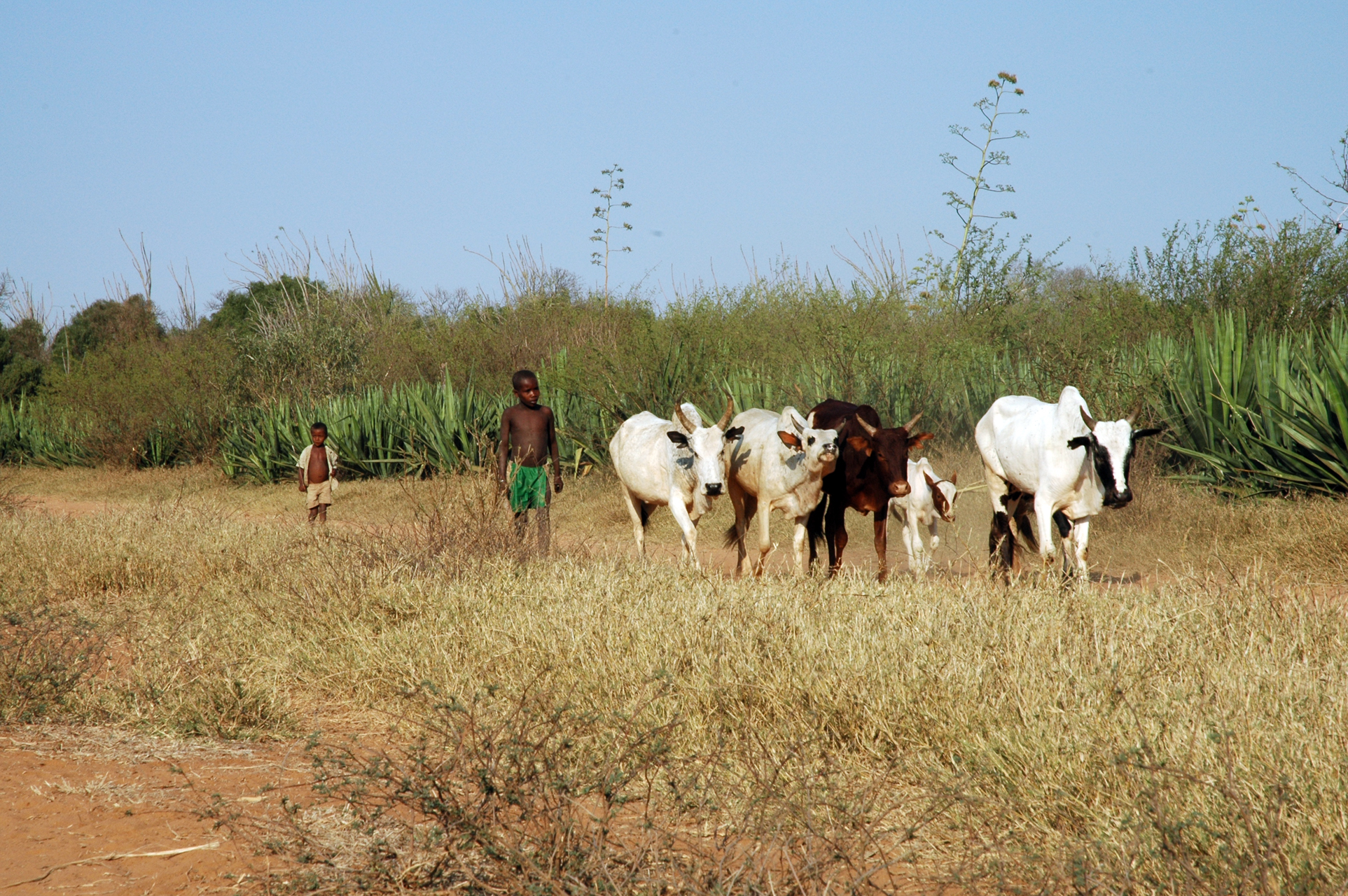
Zebu cattle grazing in Madagascar.

Although it is known to occur in several protected sites, populations of this gecko are under threat from strong human pressure, as slash-and-burn agriculture and cattle grazing take place even within the protected sites. Geckos of the Uroplatus fimbriatus group generally appear to be intolerant towards extensive degradation of their forest habitat, though U. garamaso appears to be rather common in disturbed areas of the Analamerana Special Reserve. This species is also known to be collected for the pet trade, albeit in very low numbers.
