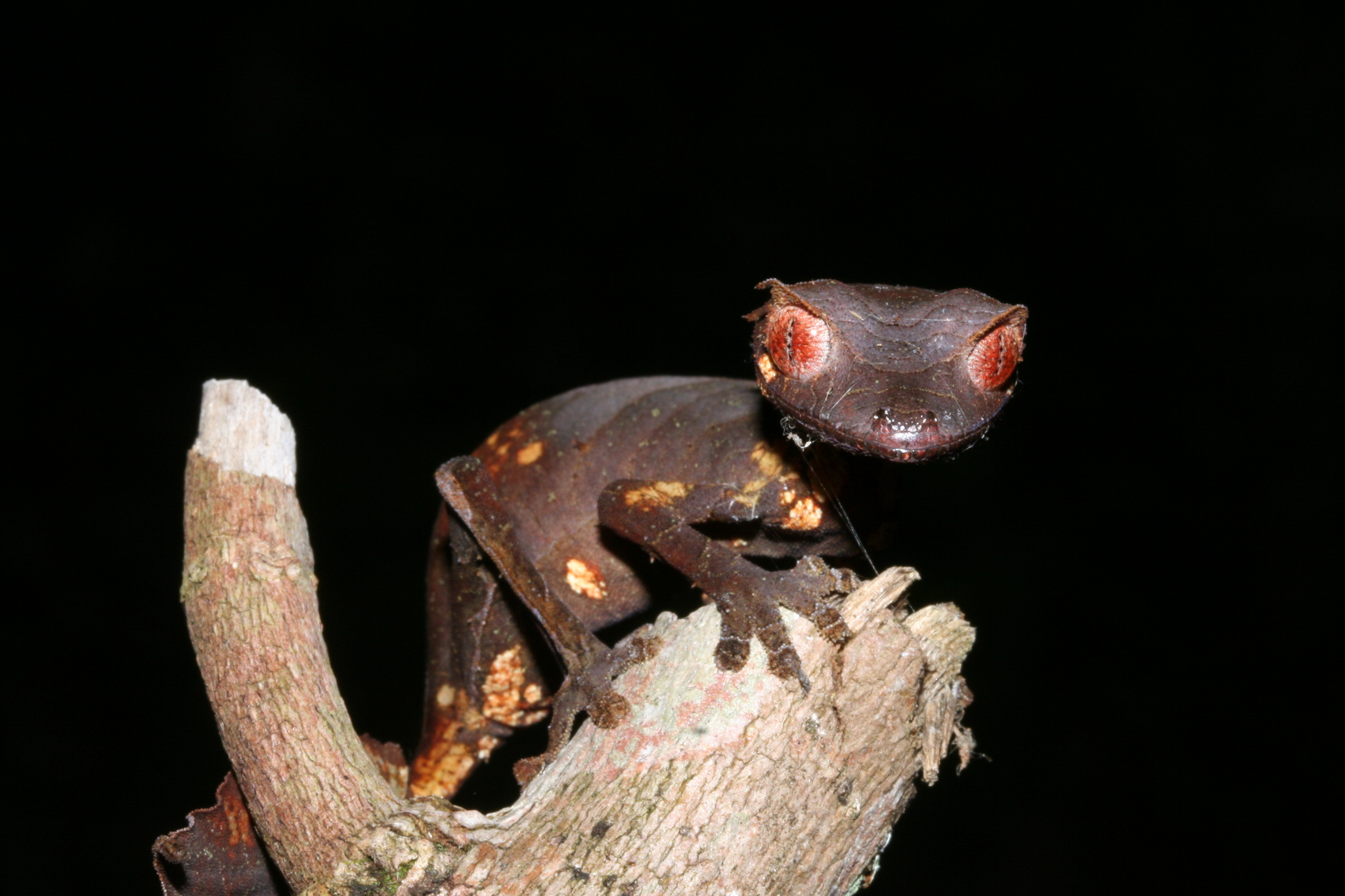

Conservation status
- Least Concern (IUCN 3.1)

Scientific classification
- Kingdom: Animalia
- Phylum: Chordata
- Class: Reptilia
- Order: Squamata
- Suborder: Gekkota
- Family: Gekkonidae
- Genus: Uroplatus
- Species: U. phantasticus

Binomial name
- Uroplatus phantasticus Boulenger, 1888
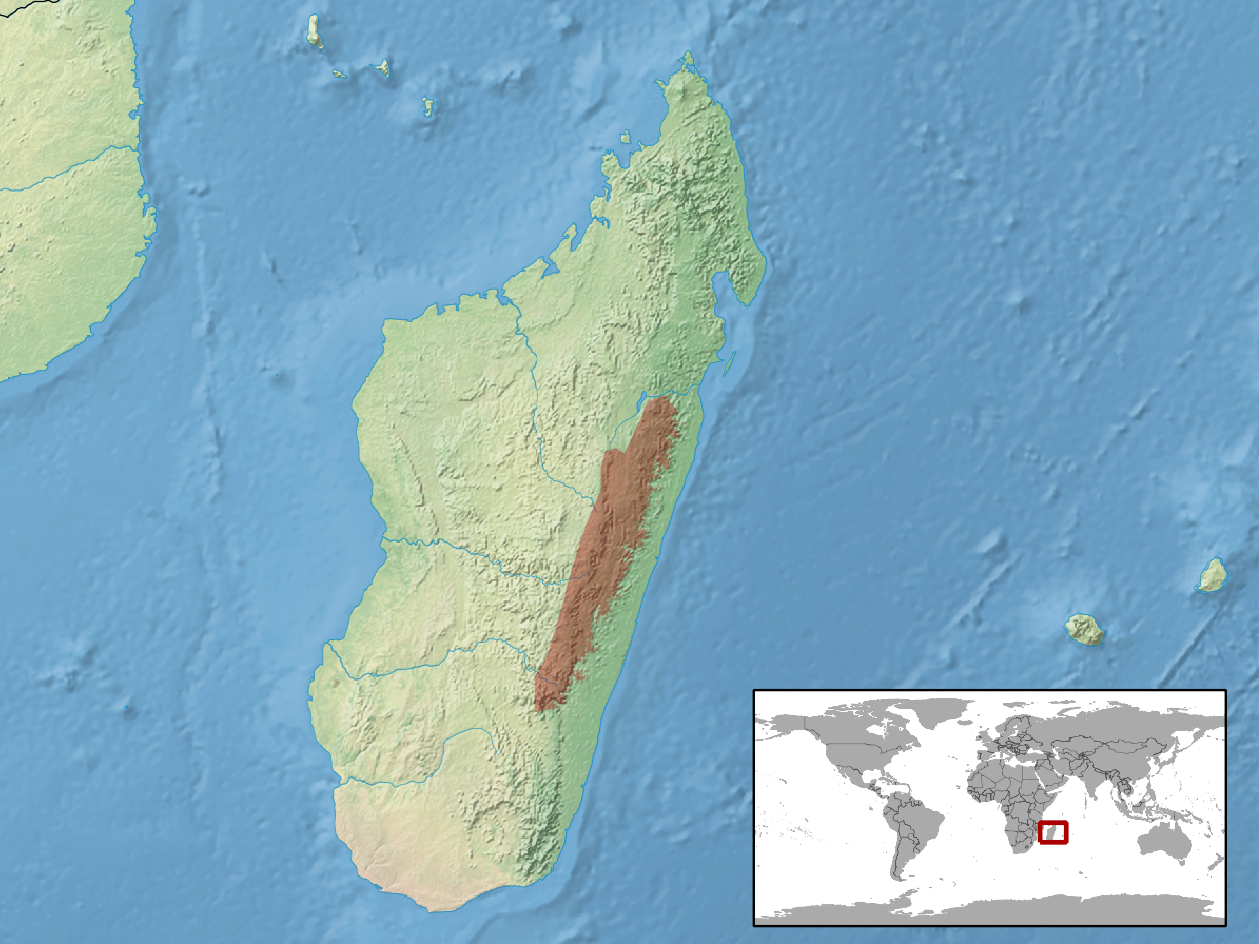

= Uroplatus phantasticus =

Species of gecko endemic to Madagascar

Uroplatus phantasticus, the satanic leaf-tailed gecko, eyelash leaf-tailed gecko or the phantastic leaf-tailed gecko, is a species of gecko indigenous to the island of Madagascar. First described in 1888 by George Albert Boulenger, U. phantasticus is the smallest in body of the Uroplatus geckos, though there is an ongoing debate as to whether one of its cousins, U. ebenaui, is smaller because of its shorter tail.

== Etymology ==
The generic name, Uroplatus, is a Latinization of two Greek words: "ourá" (οὐρά) meaning "tail" and "platys" (πλατύς) meaning "flat". Its specific name phantasticus is the Latin word for "imaginary", based upon the gecko's unique appearance, which led Belgian naturalist George Albert Boulenger to describe it as “mythical” in 1888.

== Distribution and habitat ==
The species is endemic to Madagascar, meaning it is found nowhere else. It is an arboreal animal that relies on its natural camouflage in the northern and central tropical forests of Madagascar.

== Description ==
Its adult size is up to 90mm in total length, including the tail.

As with all Uroplatus geckos the tail is flattened, but the leaf-like appearance is only seen in the ebenaui complex (U. phantasticus, U. ebenaui, and U. malama; although the tail size is much reduced in U. ebenaui). It has often been debated whether U. phantasticus is in fact the same species as U. ebenaui (the Nosy Bé flat-tailed gecko). However U. phantasticus possesses more, and longer, spines on the head, body and trunk. Other members of the genus Uroplatus have flattened tails that serve more to diminish the profile of the gecko while it is inactive. Some U. phantasticus geckos even have notches in their tails to further mimic a decaying leaf. This is also thought to be a form of sexual dimorphism, as the trait seems more common in the males of the species. In addition, U. phantasticus has an eyelash-like projection above each eye. During daylight hours, these adaptations help the gecko blend into its surroundings. At night it helps the gecko hunt for prey by providing camouflage.

Geckos possess no eyelids, just a transparent covering over their eyes, and so they use their long, mobile tongues to wipe away any dust or debris that gets into the eye.

The gecko occurs in a variety of colors, including hues of purple, orange, tan and yellow, but is often mottled brown, with small black dots on the underside that help to distinguish it from similar species.

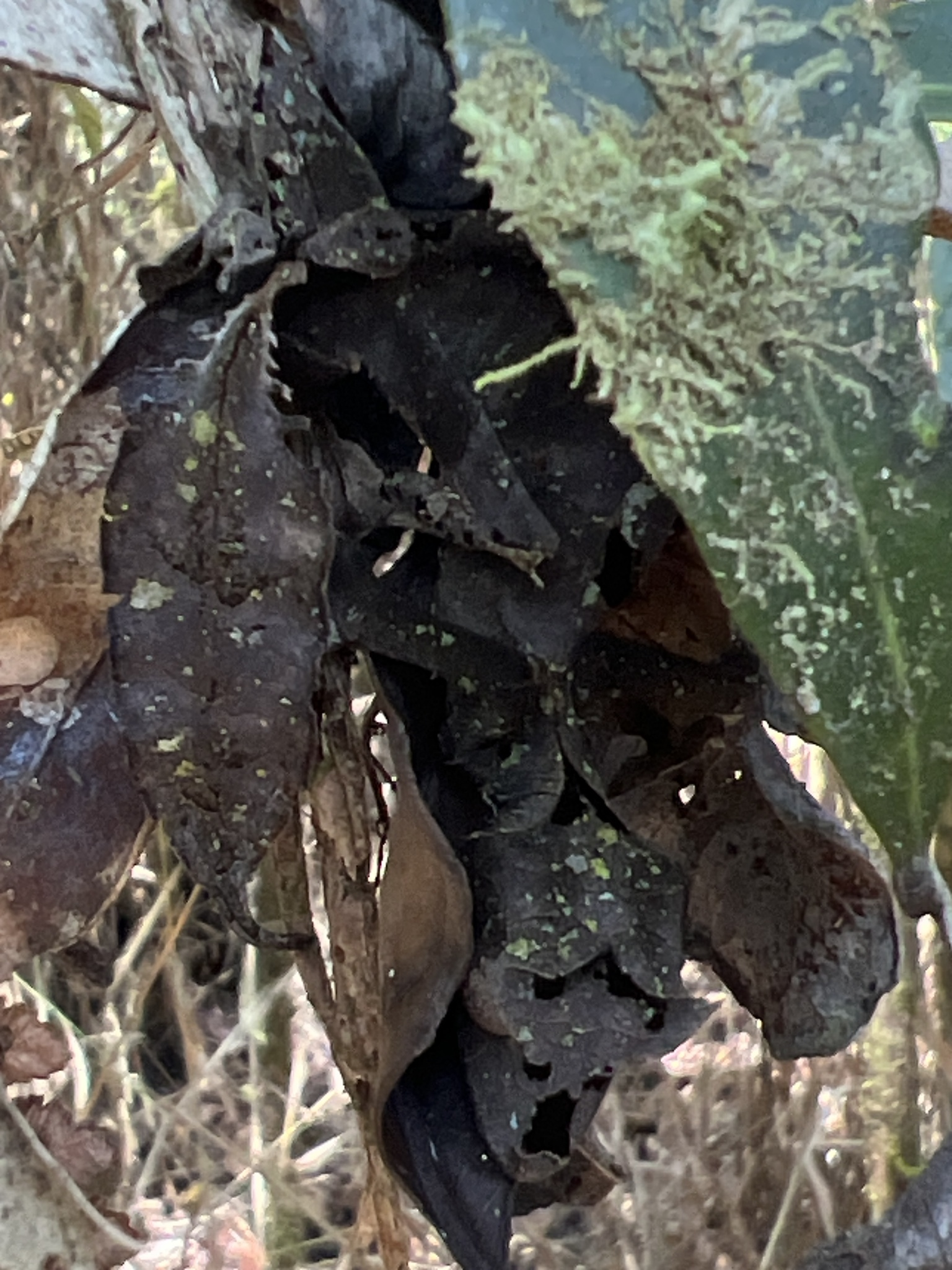
Camouflaged

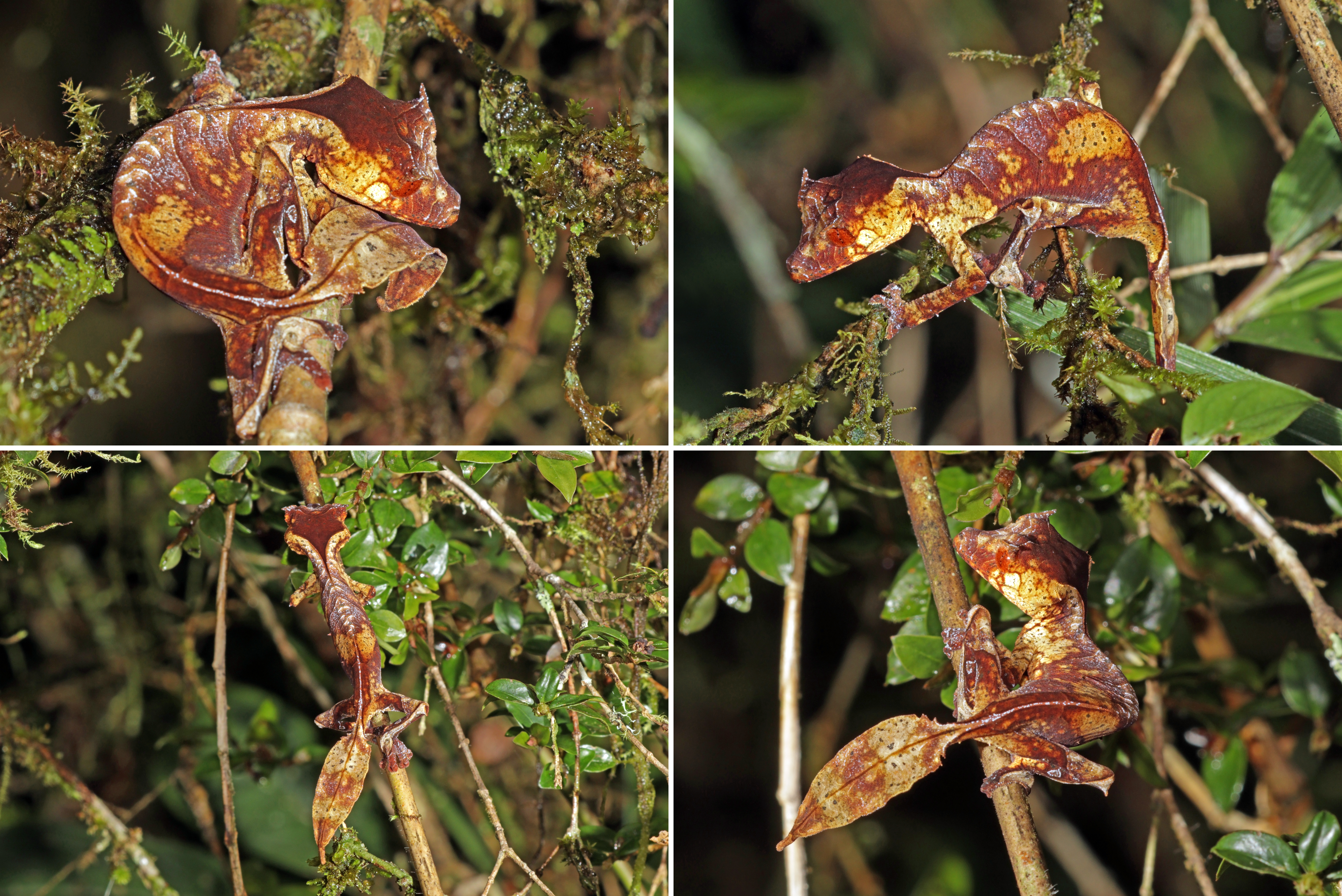
At Ranomafana National Park

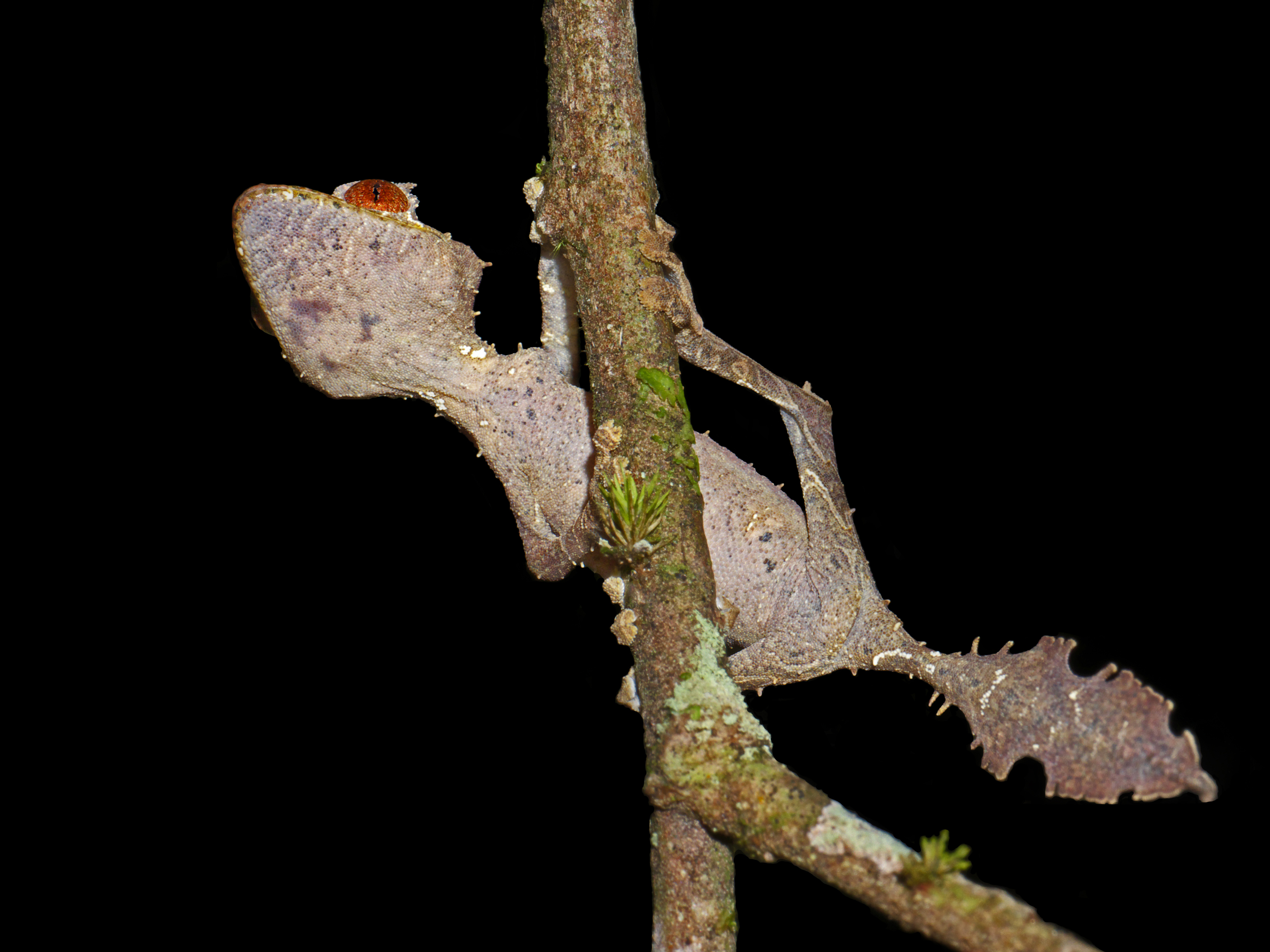
In Andasibe, ventral view

== Behavior ==
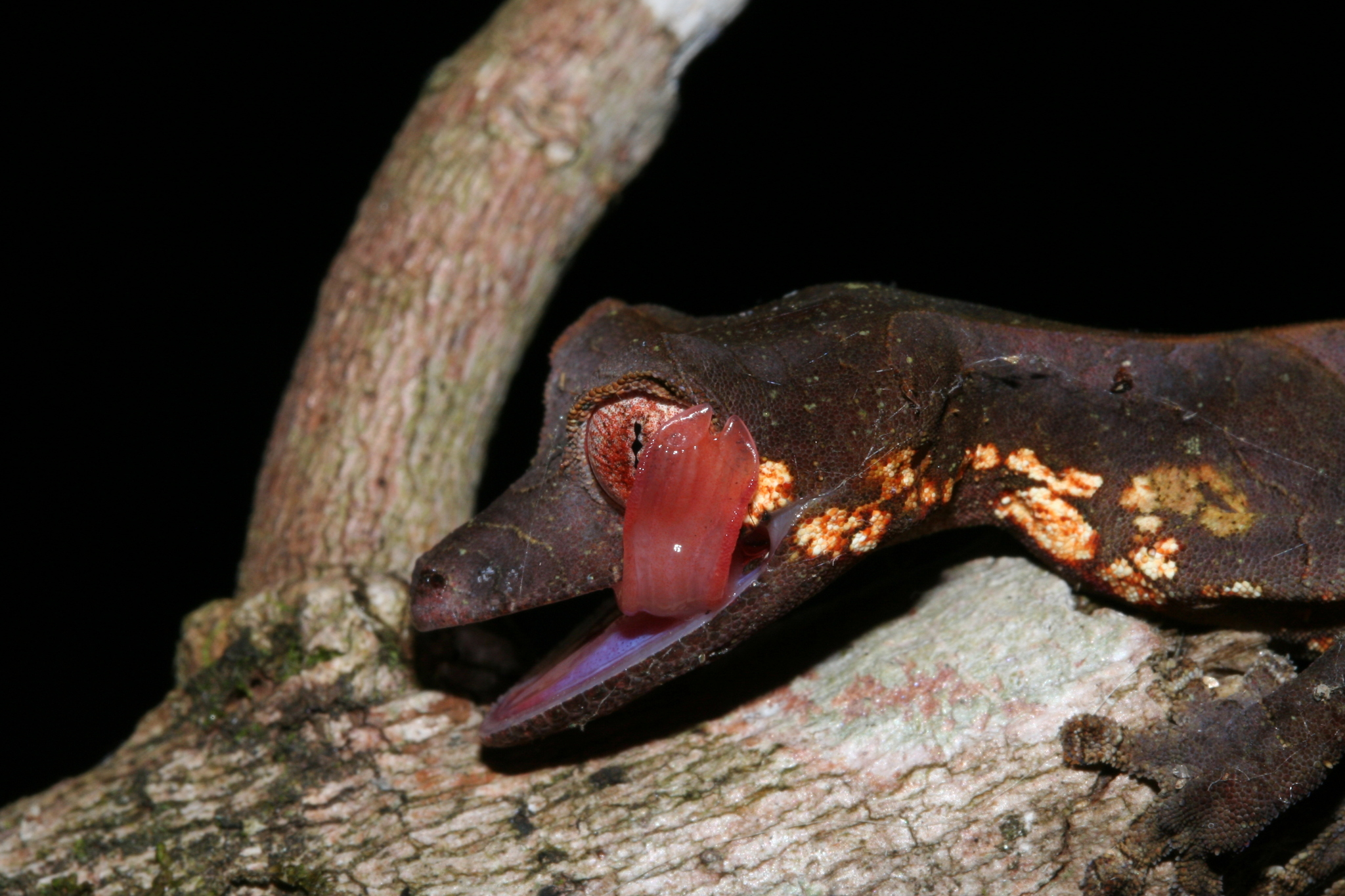
Licking eye

A nocturnal reptile, with suitably large eyes, the leaf-tailed gecko moves about its rainforest habitat at night feeding on insects. The adhesive scales under their fingers and toes and their strong curved claws enable them to move adeptly through the trees. The leaf-tailed gecko is somewhat of an expert at avoiding predators, not only through their incredible mimicry but through a number of behaviours. They can flatten their body against the substrate to reduce the body's shadow, open their jaws wide to show a frightening, bright red mouth, and voluntarily shed their tail in order to trick a predator.

Like many reptiles, the leaf-tailed gecko is oviparous, or egg-laying. Reproduction starts at the beginning of the rainy season when it lays clutches of two spherical eggs onto the ground under leaf litter or in the dead leaves of plants.

== Captivity ==
Uroplatus phantasticus is common in captivity and often kept in breeding pairs or trios. Males can be housed together as intraspecific aggression tends to be low when captive conditions are sufficient. However, even in good circumstances, there is occasional male-male aggression. Keepers of this species often simply refer to them as Phants.

The gecko eats a variety of appropriately sized insects including crickets and moths. If breeding is successful in captivity, eggs will be laid at intervals of approximately 30 days and take 90 to 120 days to hatch.

There are seven zoos in the United States that have this gecko, two of which breed it.

== Conservation ==
Habitat destruction, deforestation, and collection for the pet trade all threaten the existence of this species. Studies suggest that leaf-tailed geckos can only inhabit a very specific environment and are not tolerant of any degradation of their natural habitat. This makes them vulnerable to the impacts of habitat degradation and harvesting, a common problem due to them being popular pets. The World Wide Fund for Nature (WWF) lists all of the Uroplatus species on their "Top ten most wanted species list" of animals threatened by illegal wildlife trade, because of them "being captured and sold at alarming rates for the international pet trade". It is a CITES Appendix 2 protected animal.

Protected areas are therefore essential, and at present, the satanic leaf-tailed gecko is known to occur in at least three: Tsaratanana Strict Nature Reserve, Marojejy National Park, and Anjanaharibe Special Reserve. However, illegal harvesting of leaf-tailed geckos is known to occur even within protected areas, and efforts to control this threatening activity are required if this extraordinary and unique reptile is to endure.
