= Uroplatus fivehy =

Scientific classification
- Kingdom: Animalia
- Phylum: Chordata
- Class: Reptilia
- Order: Squamata
- Suborder: Gekkota
- Family: Gekkonidae
- Genus: Uroplatus
- Species: U. fivehy

Binomial name
- Uroplatus fivehy Ratsoavina, Ranjanaharisoa, Glaw, Raselimanana, Rakotoarison, Vieites, Hawlitschek, Vences, & Scherz, 2020

Species of lizard

Uroplatus fivehy is a species of lizard in the family Gekkonidae. It is endemic to Madagascar.
