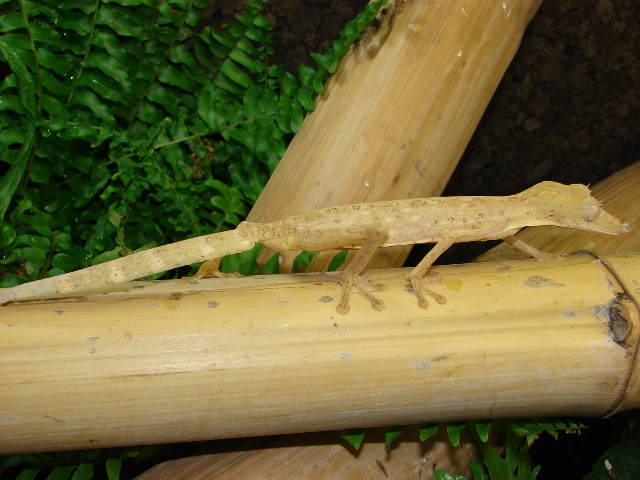

Conservation status
- Least Concern (IUCN 3.1)

Scientific classification
- Kingdom: Animalia
- Phylum: Chordata
- Class: Reptilia
- Order: Squamata
- Suborder: Gekkota
- Family: Gekkonidae
- Genus: Uroplatus
- Species: U. lineatus

Binomial name
- Uroplatus lineatus Duméril & Bibron, 1836
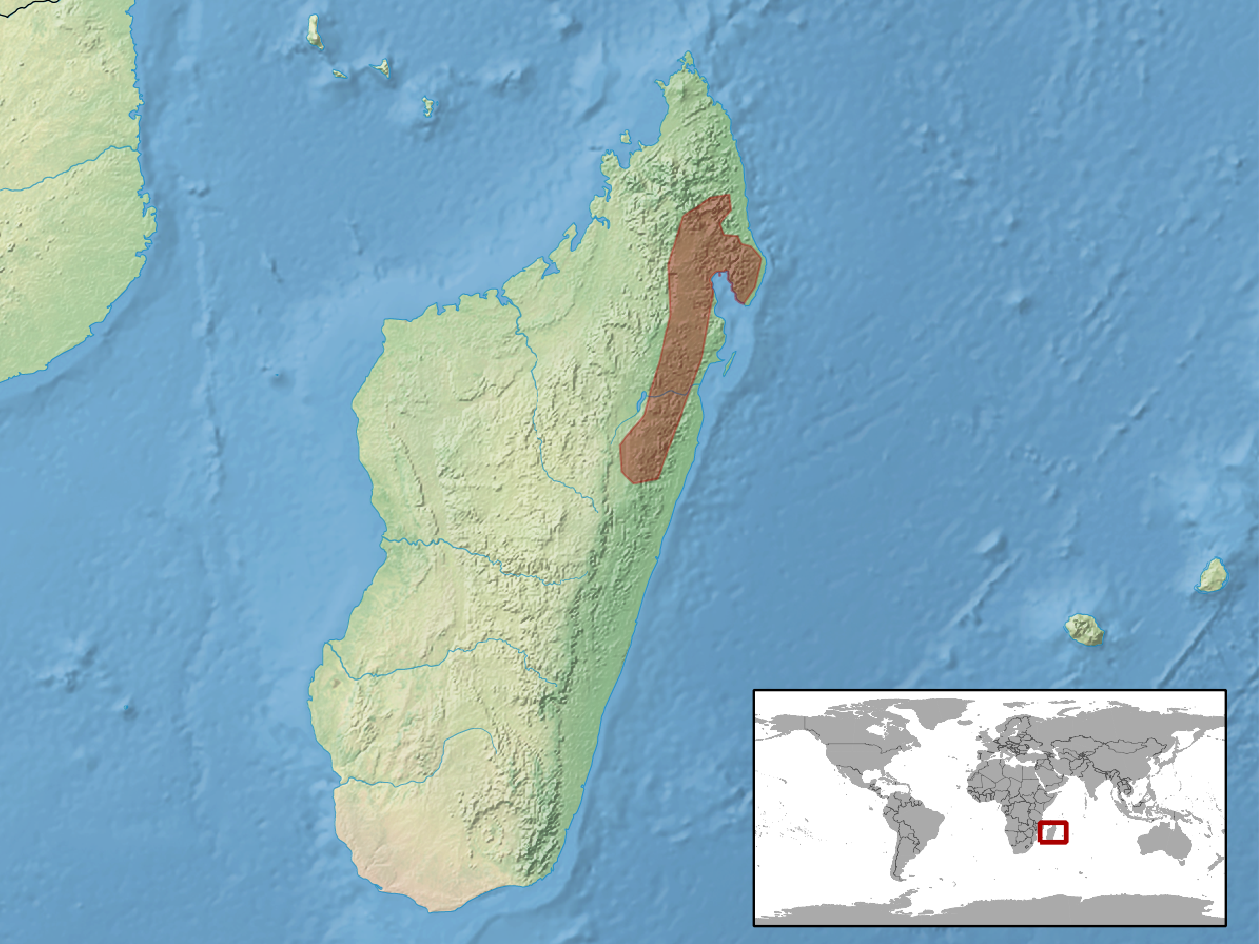

= Lined flat-tail gecko =

Species of lizard

The lined flat-tail gecko (Uroplatus lineatus) is a gecko which is found in eastern Madagascar and on the island Nosy Bohara. These geckos live on trees in tropical rain forests and on bamboo plants. They reach a total length of 270 mm. Threats to this species are posed by deforestation and illegal pet trade.

== Taxonomy and etymology ==
The generic name, Uroplatus, is a Latinization of two Greek words: "ourá" (οὐρά) meaning "tail" and "platys" (πλατύς) meaning "flat". Its specific name, lineatus, is the Latin word for "lined" in reference to the longitudinal stripes on the lizard's body.
