= Uroplatus finaritra =

Scientific classification
- Kingdom: Animalia
- Phylum: Chordata
- Class: Reptilia
- Order: Squamata
- Suborder: Gekkota
- Family: Gekkonidae
- Genus: Uroplatus
- Species: U. finaritra

Binomial name
- Uroplatus finaritra Ratsoavina, Raselimanana, Scherz, Rakotoarison, Razafindraibe, Glaw & Vences, 2019

Leaf-tailed gecko native to Madagascar

Uroplatus finaritra is a species of leaf-tailed gecko native to Madagascar. It can be found in Marojejy National Park, on the island's northeastern side.

Locally, it is called "tahafisaka" and experts believe that it may be listed as an endangered species.

== Description ==
Uroplatus finaritra can grow up to 4-6 inches or 15 centimeters. It also has a red mouth, as well as a tail that is relatively short compared to its body length. They are around 50 percent larger than other Uroplatus species.

=== Camouflage ===
Like many species of leaf-tailed geckos, Uroplatus finaritra is able to mimic leaves or twigs. Due to this, they usually rest in dead leaves in order to mimic the leaves and twigs around it.
