= Uroplatus fetsy =

Scientific classification
- Kingdom: Animalia
- Phylum: Chordata
- Class: Reptilia
- Order: Squamata
- Suborder: Gekkota
- Family: Gekkonidae
- Genus: Uroplatus
- Species: U. fetsy

Binomial name
- Uroplatus fetsy Ratsoavina, Scherz, Tolley, Raselimanana, Glaw, & Vences, 2019

Species of lizard

Uroplatus fetsy is a species of lizard in the family Gekkonidae. It is endemic to Madagascar.
