= Uroplatus fotsivava =

Scientific classification
- Kingdom: Animalia
- Phylum: Chordata
- Class: Reptilia
- Order: Squamata
- Suborder: Gekkota
- Family: Gekkonidae
- Genus: Uroplatus
- Species: U. fotsivava

Binomial name
- Uroplatus fotsivava Ratsoavina, Gehring, Scherz, Vieites, Glaw, & Vences, 2017

Species of lizard

Uroplatus fotsivava is a species of lizard in the family Gekkonidae. It is endemic to Madagascar.
