= Uroplatus pietschmanni =

Conservation status
- Endangered (IUCN 3.1)

Scientific classification
- Kingdom: Animalia
- Phylum: Chordata
- Class: Reptilia
- Order: Squamata
- Suborder: Gekkota
- Family: Gekkonidae
- Genus: Uroplatus
- Species: U. pietschmanni

Binomial name
- Uroplatus pietschmanni Böhle & Schönecker, 2003
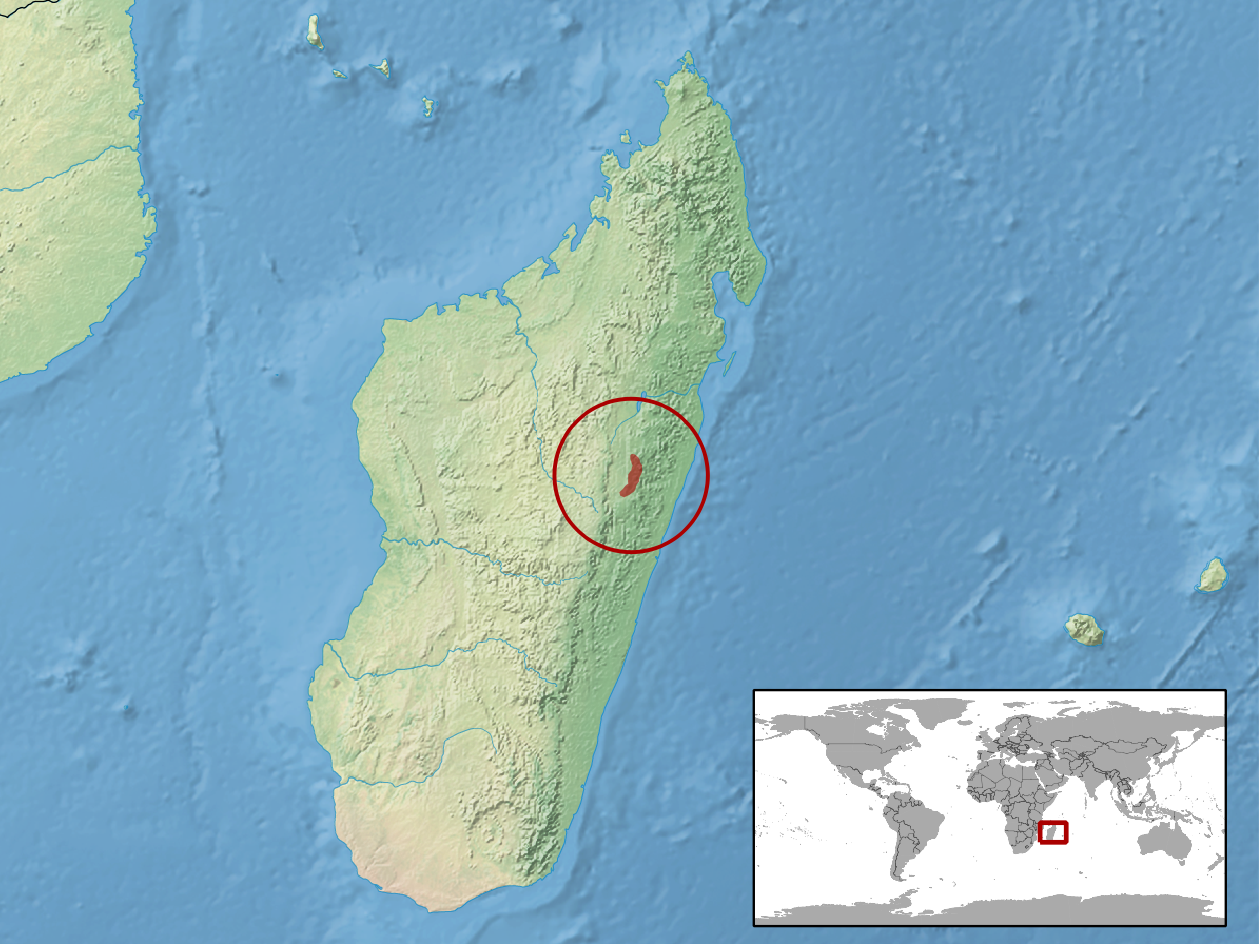

Species of lizard

Uroplatus pietschmanni, known commonly as the cork-bark leaf-tail gecko, the cork bark leaftail gecko, and the spiny leaf-tailed gecko, is a species of lizard in the family Gekkonidae. The species is endemic to Madagascar.

== Etymology ==
The specific name, pietschmanni, is in honor of German gecko breeder Jürgen Pietschmann (1949–2005).

== Geographic range ==
U. pietschmanni is found in Toamasina Province, Madagascar.

== Habitat ==
The preferred habitat of U. pietschmanni is rainforest at altitudes of 900–1,200 m (3,000–3,900 ft).

== Description ==
U. pietschmanni is a medium-sized species for its genus. Adults may attain a snout-to-vent length (SVL) of 8.1 cm (3.2 in), and a total length (including tail) of 13.4 cm (5.3 in).

== Reproduction ==
- U. pietschmanni is oviparous.
