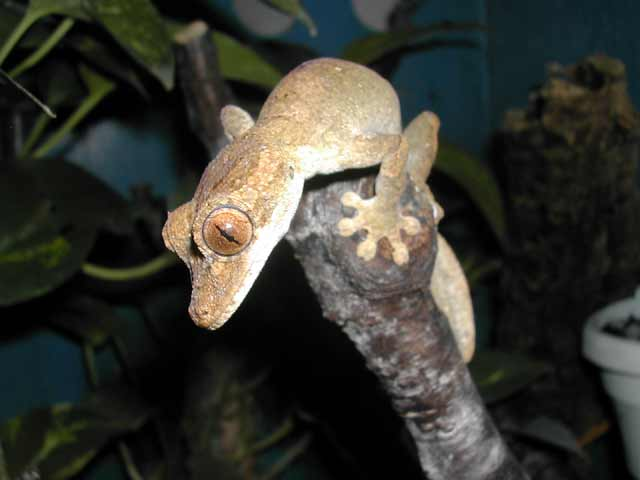

Conservation status
- Endangered (IUCN 3.1)

Scientific classification
- Kingdom: Animalia
- Phylum: Chordata
- Class: Reptilia
- Order: Squamata
- Suborder: Gekkota
- Family: Gekkonidae
- Genus: Uroplatus
- Species: U. guentheri

Binomial name
- Uroplatus guentheri Mocquard, 1908
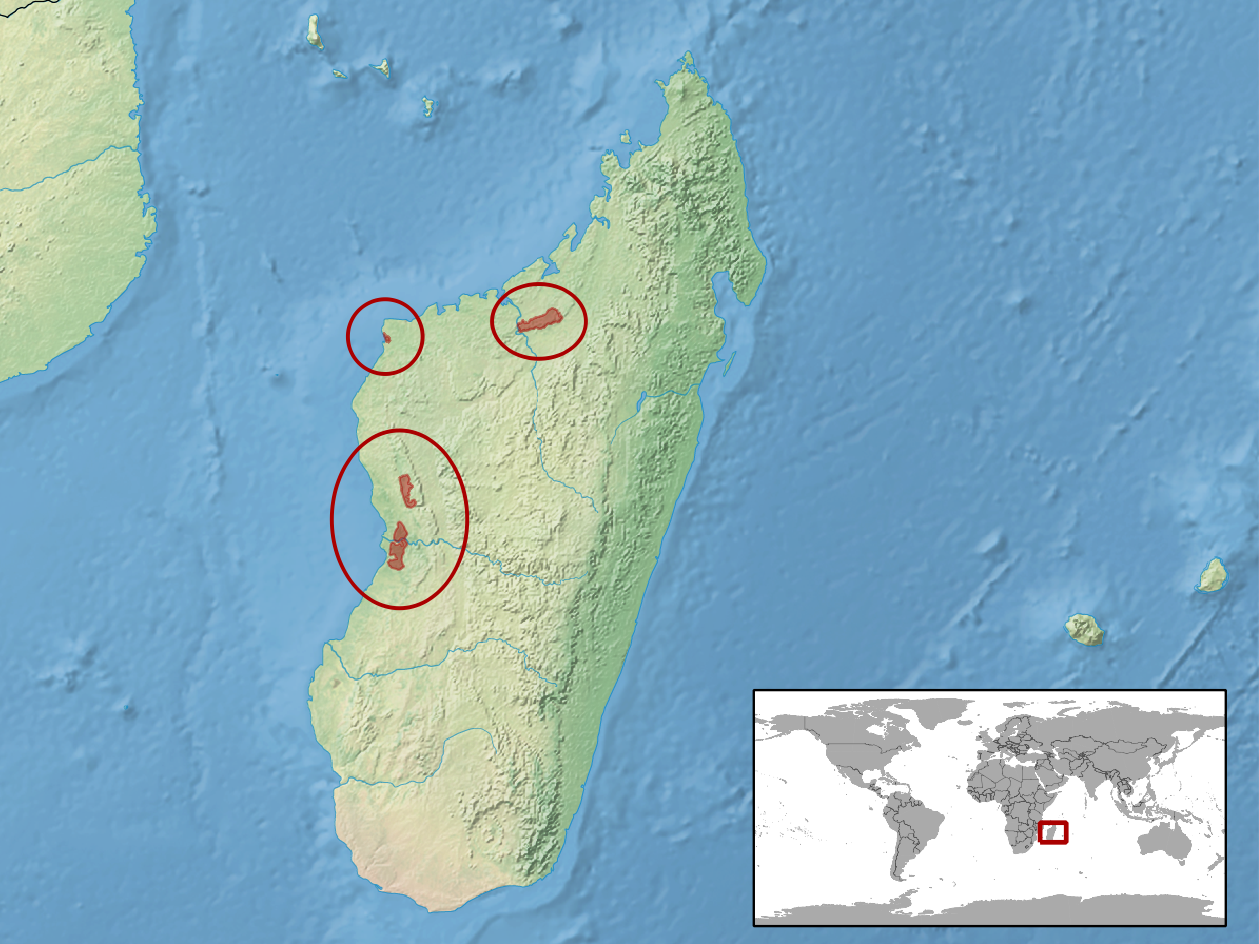

Synonyms
- Uroplatus Güntheri Mocquard, 1908; Uroplatus guentheri — Wermuth, 1965

= Günther's flat-tail gecko =

Species of lizard

Günther's flat-tail gecko (Uroplatus guentheri), also known commonly as Güenther's leaf-tail gecko, is a species of nocturnal gecko, a lizard in the family Gekkonidae. The species is endemic to Madagascar.

== Etymology ==
The specific name, guentheri, is in honour of German-born British herpetologist Albert Günther.

== Geographic range ==
U. guentheri is found in northwestern Madagascar in the area around Ankarafansika and near Morondava in western Madagascar.

== Description ==
U. guentheri reaches a total length (including tail) of 150 mm (5.9 in).

== Habitat ==
The preferred natural habitat of U. guentheri is forest, at altitudes of 30–120 m (98–394 ft).

== Behaviour ==
U. guentheri forages and roosts on small trees and bushes. It is generally found less than 6 m (20 ft) above the ground. It is very difficult to find during the day, using its camouflage to mimic dead branches and bits of bark. During the night however, it becomes active, hunting for invertebrate prey.

== Reproduction ==
U. guentheri is oviparous. The sperical eggs are laid in leaf litter.
