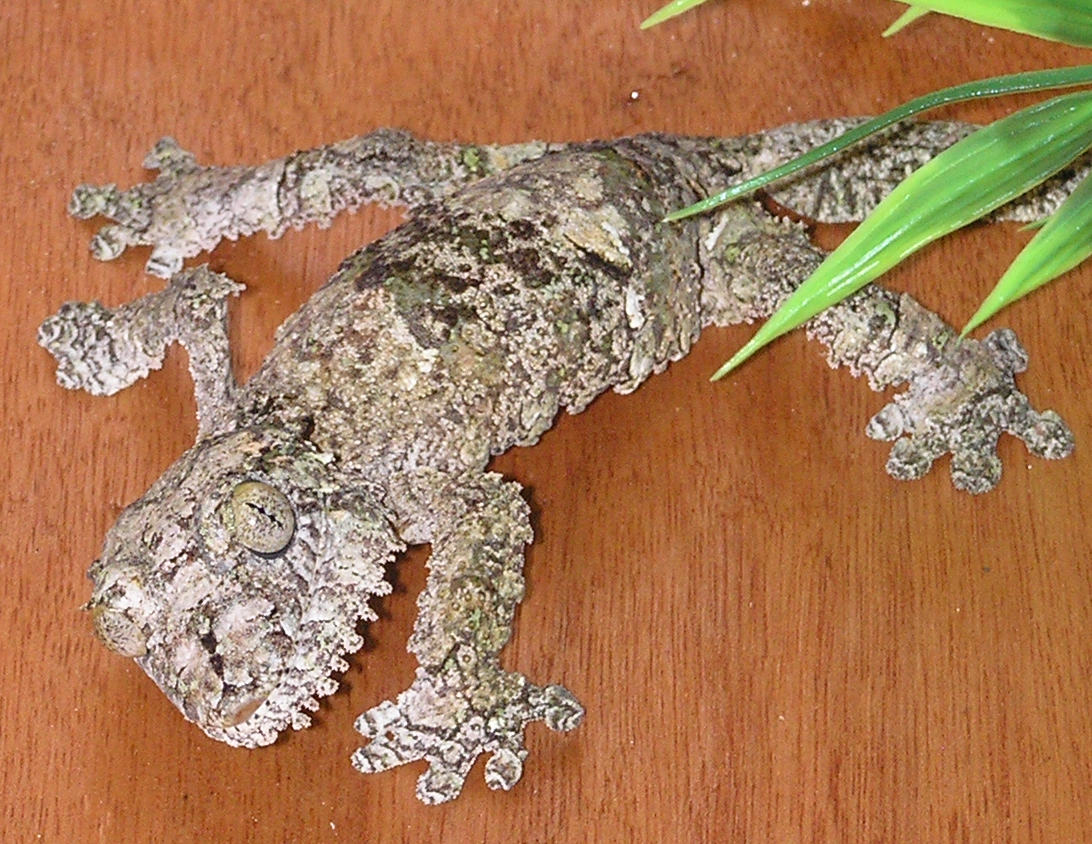
- Uroplatus sameiti

Conservation status
- CITES Appendix II

Scientific classification
- Kingdom: Animalia
- Phylum: Chordata
- Class: Reptilia
- Order: Squamata
- Suborder: Gekkota
- Family: Gekkonidae
- Subfamily: Uroplatinae
- Genus: Uroplatus; A.M.C. Duméril, 1806

Species
- 21 species (see text)

= Uroplatus =

Genus of lizards

Uroplatus (from Ancient Greek οὐρά (ourá), meaning "tail", and πλατύς (platús), meaning "flat") is a genus of geckos, commonly referred to as leaf-tail geckos or flat-tailed geckos, which are endemic to Madagascar and its coastal islands, such as Nosy Be. They are nocturnal, insectivorous lizards found exclusively in primary and secondary forest.

== Etymology ==
The generic name, Uroplatus, is a Latinization of two Greek words: "ourá" (οὐρά) meaning "tail" and "platys" (πλατύς) meaning "flat".

== Description ==
Geckos of the genus Uroplatus are nocturnal and arboreal. They range in total length (including tail) from about 30 cm (12 in) for U. giganteus to 10 cm (3.9 in) for U. ebenaui. Larger species of Uroplatus are distinguished among geckos in having the largest number of marginal teeth among all living amniotes. Their distinctive laryngotracheal complex has been used to defend their monophyly. Other rare apomorphic character states include multiple inscriptional ribs, restriction of autotomy planes, and finger-like diverticula of the lungs.

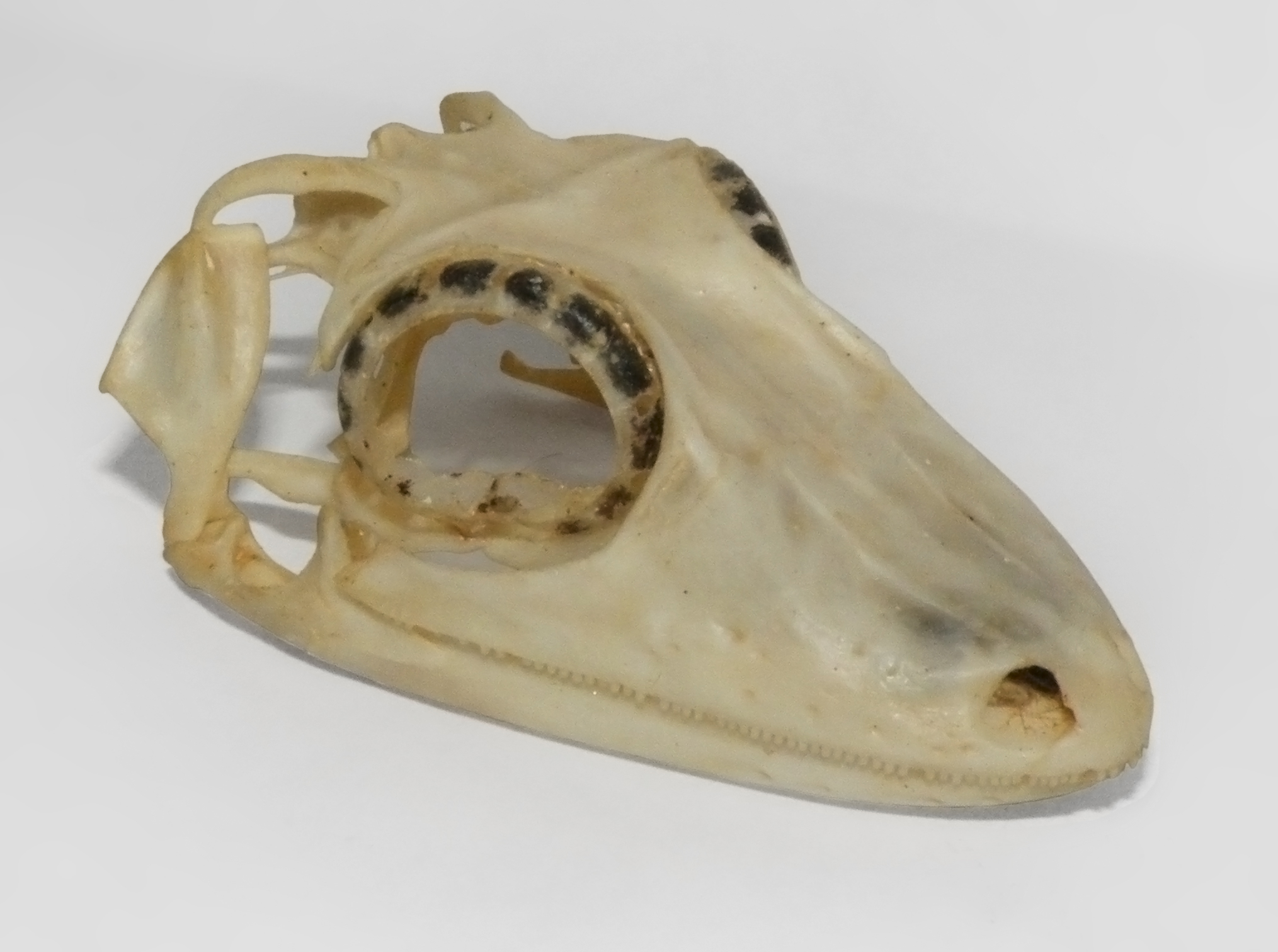
The skull of Uroplatus phantasticus.

All Uroplatus species have highly cryptic colouration, which acts as camouflage, most being grayish-brown to black or greenish-brown with various markings resembling tree bark. There are two variations of this camouflage: leaf form, and bark form. The leaf form is present in a number of small-bodied species. All other forms blend in well with tree bark upon which they rest during the day. Some of these tree bark forms have developed a flap of skin, running the length of the body, known as a "dermal flap", which they lay against the tree during the day, scattering shadows, and making their outline practically invisible. These geckos bear a resemblance to geckos of the genera Phyllurus and Saltuarius of Australia. This is an example of convergent evolution.

The skull of Uroplatus is strongly ossified, with an extremely high tooth count and incipient secondary palate.

== Ecology ==
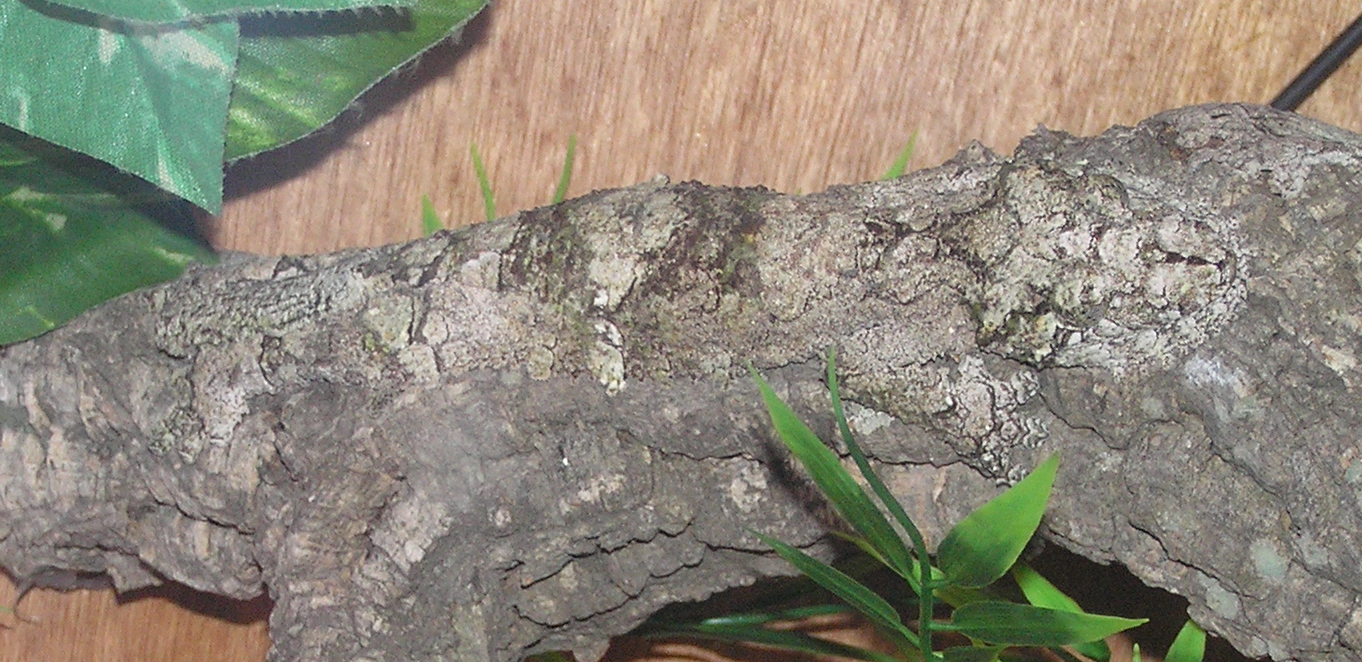
Example of camouflage

Uroplatus geckos are exclusively nocturnal. The larger species spend most of the daylight hours hanging vertically on tree trunks, head down, resting, while the smaller leaf tailed geckos (U. phantasticus, U. ebenaui, U. finiavana, U. malama, U. fiera, U. fotsivava, and U. kelirambo) spend more time in bushes and small trees imitating twigs and leaves. They are all insectivores.

During their breeding season, female Uroplatus lay from 2–4 eggs depending on species and conditions.

== Captivity ==
Uroplatus are found in the herpetology and pet trade, but rarely. Most are threatened by deforestation and habitat loss. The difficulty in diagnosing between species has led to accidental exportation of both threatened and undescribed species.

== Threats ==
Habitat destruction and deforestation in Madagascar is the primary threat to the future of Uroplatus geckos as well as collection for the pet trade. The World Wide Fund for Nature (WWF) lists all of the Uroplatus species on their "Top ten most wanted species list" of animals threatened by illegal wildlife trade, because of it "being captured and sold at alarming rates for the international pet trade". It is a CITES Appendix 2 protected animal.

== Taxonomy ==
The genus Uroplatus has had a complex taxonomic history. A detailed study from 2013 suggested there were at least 11 undescribed cryptic species in the genus, several of which have been described since its publication. In an attempt to better delineate the species boundaries of this genus, researchers have proposed karyotype analysis. These studies have yielded interesting results suggesting that Uroplatus is in a transitory evolutionary phase between two different chromosome shapes, arocentric and asymmetrical.

== Species ==
Uroplatus fimbriatus

The following 22 species are recognised.

- Uroplatus alluaudi Mocquard, 1894 – northern leaf-tail gecko
- Uroplatus ebenaui (Boettger, 1879) – spearpoint leaf-tail gecko
- Uroplatus fangorn Ratsoavina, Ranjanaharisoa, Glaw, Raselimanana, Rakotoarison, Vieites, Hawlitschek, Vences & Scherz, 2020
- Uroplatus fetsy Ratsoavina, Scherz, Tolley, Raselimanana, Glaw & Vences, 2019
- Uroplatus fiera Ratsoavina, Ranjanaharisoa, Glaw, Raselimanana, Miralles & Vences, 2015
- Uroplatus fimbriatus (Schneider, 1797) – common leaf-tail gecko
- Uroplatus finaritra Ratsoavina, Raselimanana, Scherz, Rakotoarison, Razafindraibe, Glaw & Vences, 2019
- Uroplatus finiavana Ratsoavina, Louis, Crottini, Randrianiaina, Glaw & Vences, 2011
- Uroplatus fivehy Ratsoavina, Ranjanaharisoa, Glaw, Raselimanana, Rakotoarison, Vieites, Hawlitschek, Vences & Scherz, 2020
- Uroplatus fotsivava Ratsoavina, Gehring, Scherz, Vieites, Glaw & Vences, 2017
- Uroplatus garamaso Glaw, Köhler, Ratsoavina, Raselimanana, Crottini, Gehring, Böhme, Scherz & Vences, 2023
- Uroplatus giganteus Glaw, Kosuch, Henkel, Sound & Böhme, 2006 – giant leaf-tail gecko
- Uroplatus guentheri Mocquard, 1908 – Günther's flat-tail gecko, Günther's leaf-tail gecko
- Uroplatus henkeli Böhme & Ibisch, 1990 – frilled leaf-tail gecko
- Uroplatus kelirambo Ratsoavina, Gehring, Scherz, Vieites, Glaw & Vences, 2017
- Uroplatus lineatus (A.M.C. Duméril & Bibron, 1836) – lined leaf-tail gecko
- Uroplatus malahelo Nussbaum & Raxworthy, 1994
- Uroplatus malama Nussbaum & Raxworthy, 1995
- Uroplatus phantasticus (Boulenger, 1888) – satanic leaf-tail gecko
- Uroplatus pietschmanni Böhle & Schönecker, 2003 – cork-bark leaf-tail gecko
- Uroplatus sameiti Böhme & Ibisch, 1990
- Uroplatus sikorae (Boettger, 1913) – mossy leaf-tail gecko

Nota bene: A binomial authority in parentheses indicates that the species was originally described in a genus other than Uroplatus.
