= Uroplatus kelirambo =

Scientific classification
- Kingdom: Animalia
- Phylum: Chordata
- Class: Reptilia
- Order: Squamata
- Suborder: Gekkota
- Family: Gekkonidae
- Genus: Uroplatus
- Species: U. kelirambo

Binomial name
- Uroplatus kelirambo Ratsoavina, Gehring, Scherz, Vieites, Glaw, & Vences, 2017

Species of lizard

Uroplatus kelirambo is a species of lizard in the family Gekkonidae. It is endemic to Madagascar.
