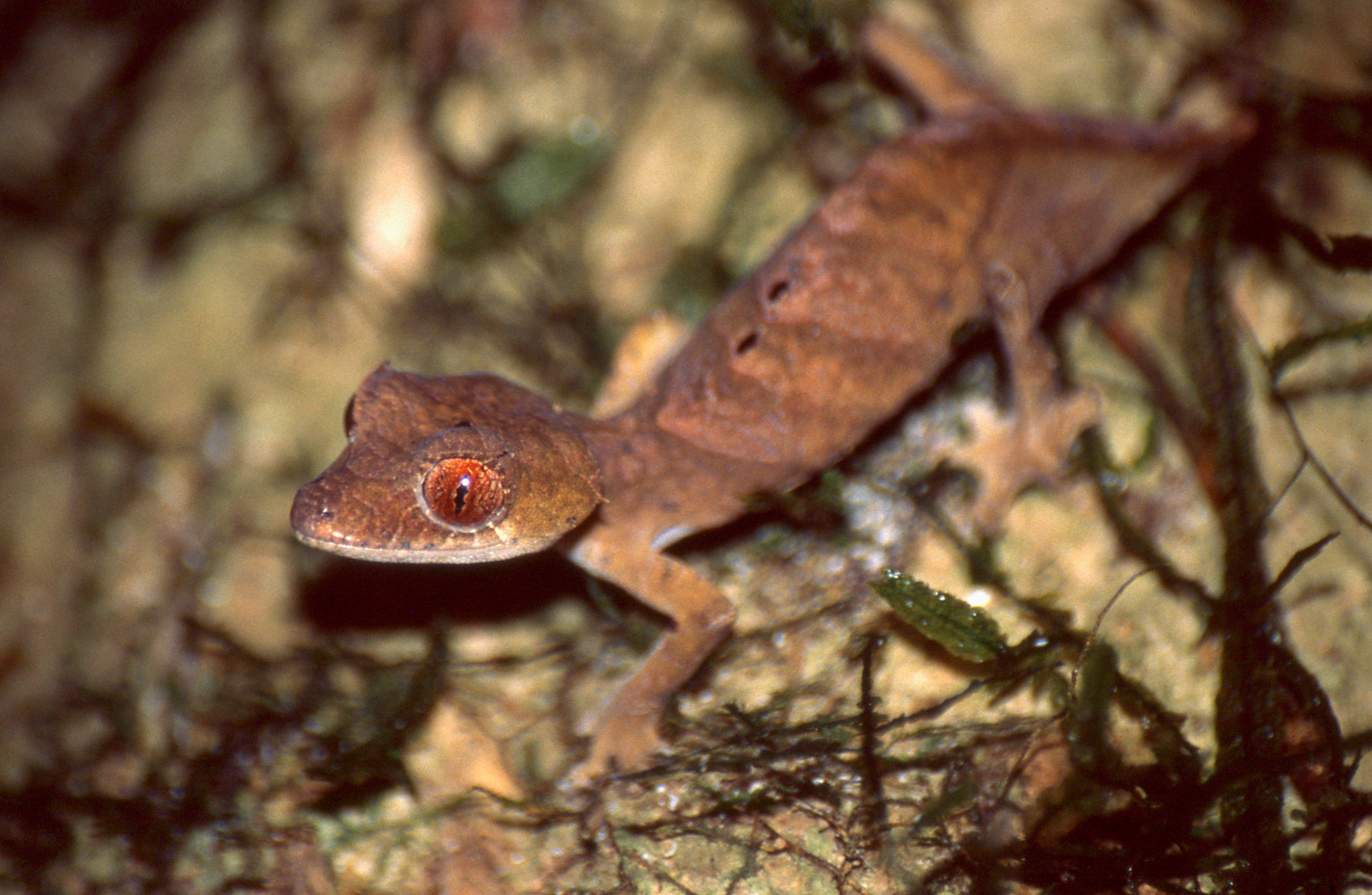

Conservation status
- Near Threatened (IUCN 3.1)

Scientific classification
- Kingdom: Animalia
- Phylum: Chordata
- Class: Reptilia
- Order: Squamata
- Suborder: Gekkota
- Family: Gekkonidae
- Genus: Uroplatus
- Species: U. finiavana

Binomial name
- Uroplatus finiavana Ratsoavina, Louis Jr., Crottini, Randrianiana, Glaw, & Vences, 2011
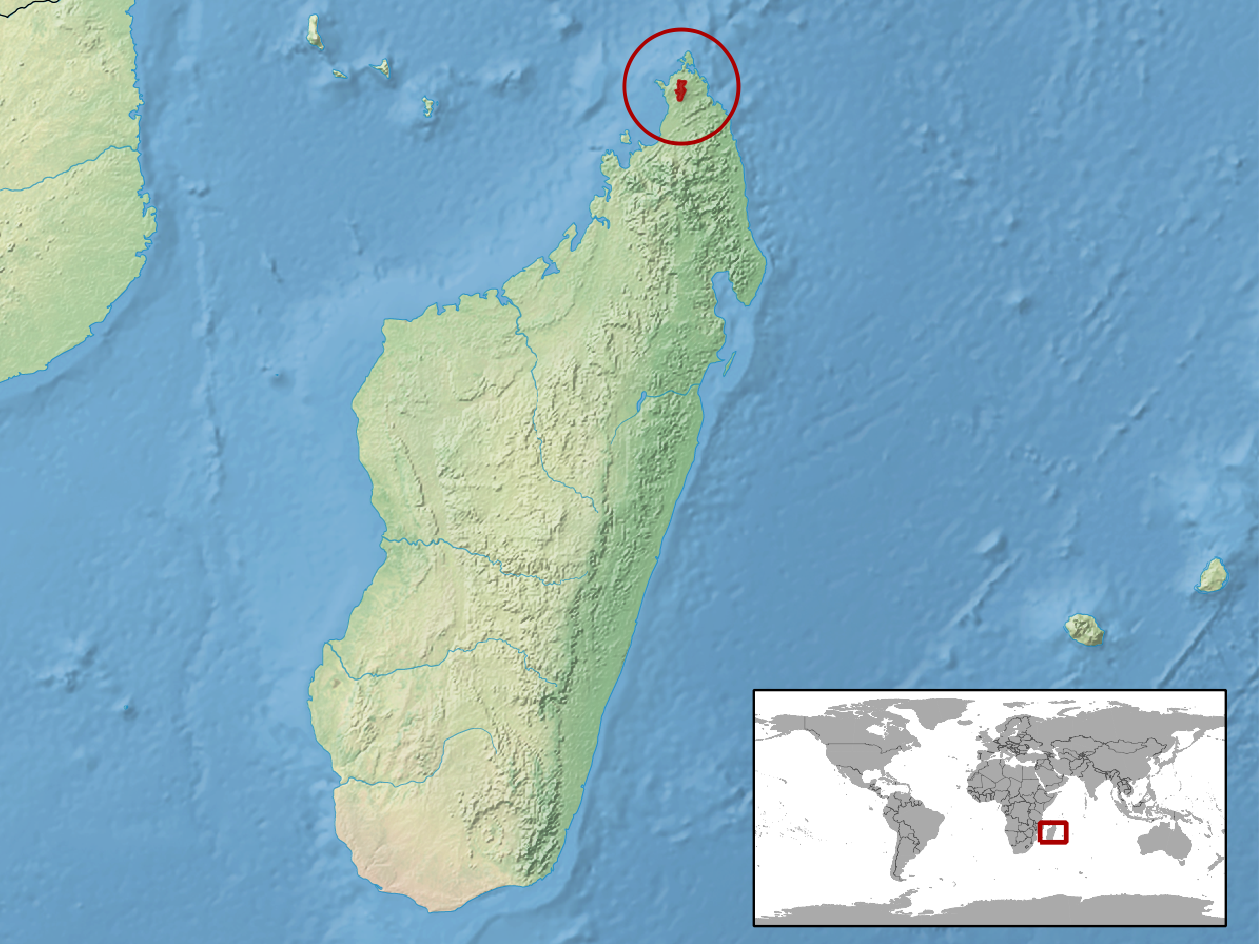

= Uroplatus finiavana =

Species of lizard

Uroplatus finiavana is a species of lizard in the family Gekkonidae. It is endemic to Madagascar.
