= Uroplatus malama =

Conservation status
- Vulnerable (IUCN 3.1)

Scientific classification
- Kingdom: Animalia
- Phylum: Chordata
- Class: Reptilia
- Order: Squamata
- Suborder: Gekkota
- Family: Gekkonidae
- Genus: Uroplatus
- Species: U. malama

Binomial name
- Uroplatus malama Nussbaum & Raxworthy, 1995

Species of lizard

Uroplatus malama range

Uroplatus malama is a species of lizard in the family Gekkonidae. It is endemic to Madagascar.
