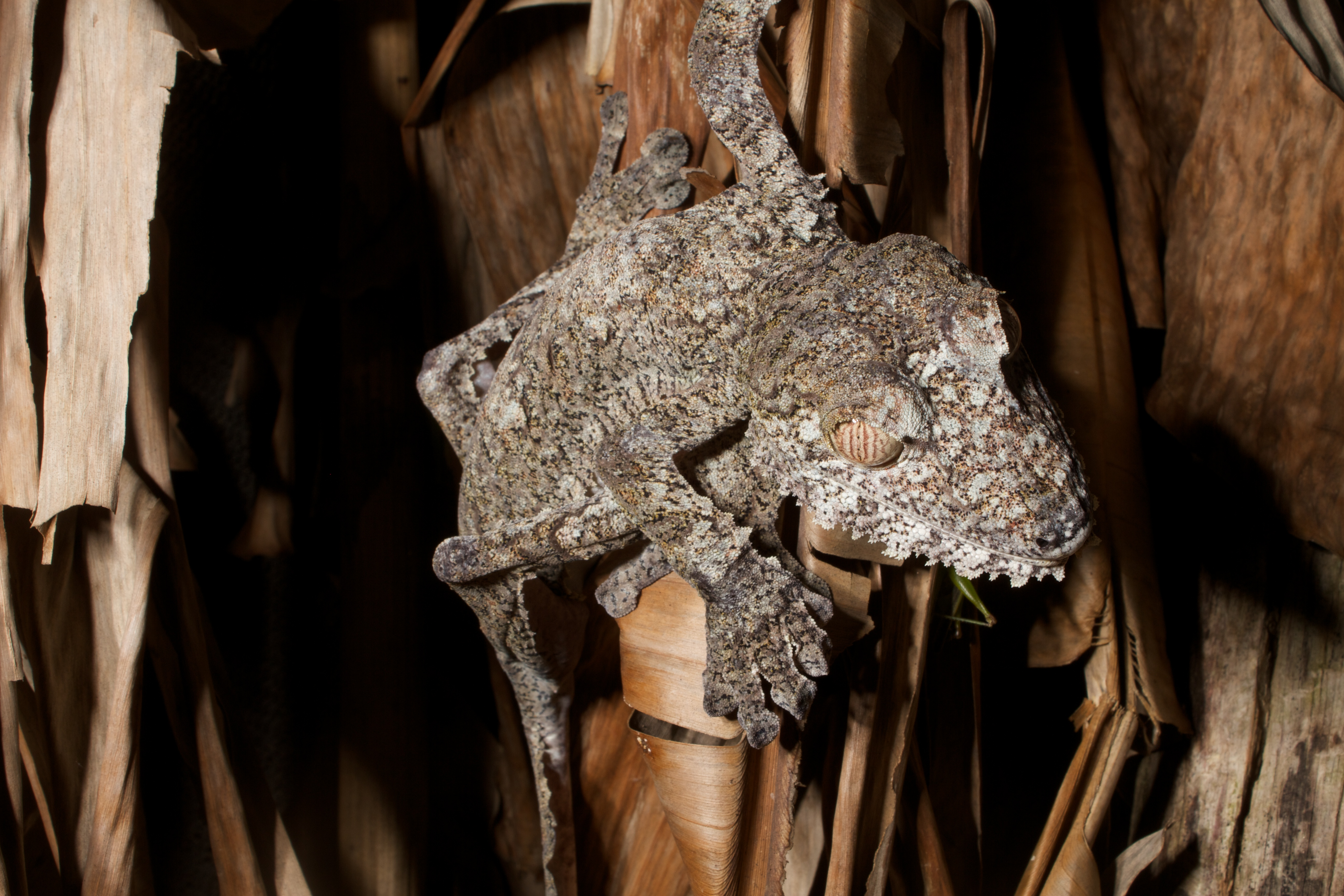

Conservation status
- Vulnerable (IUCN 3.1)

Scientific classification
- Kingdom: Animalia
- Phylum: Chordata
- Class: Reptilia
- Order: Squamata
- Suborder: Gekkota
- Family: Gekkonidae
- Genus: Uroplatus
- Species: U. giganteus

Binomial name
- Uroplatus giganteus Glaw, Kosuch, Henkel, Sound & Böhme, 2006
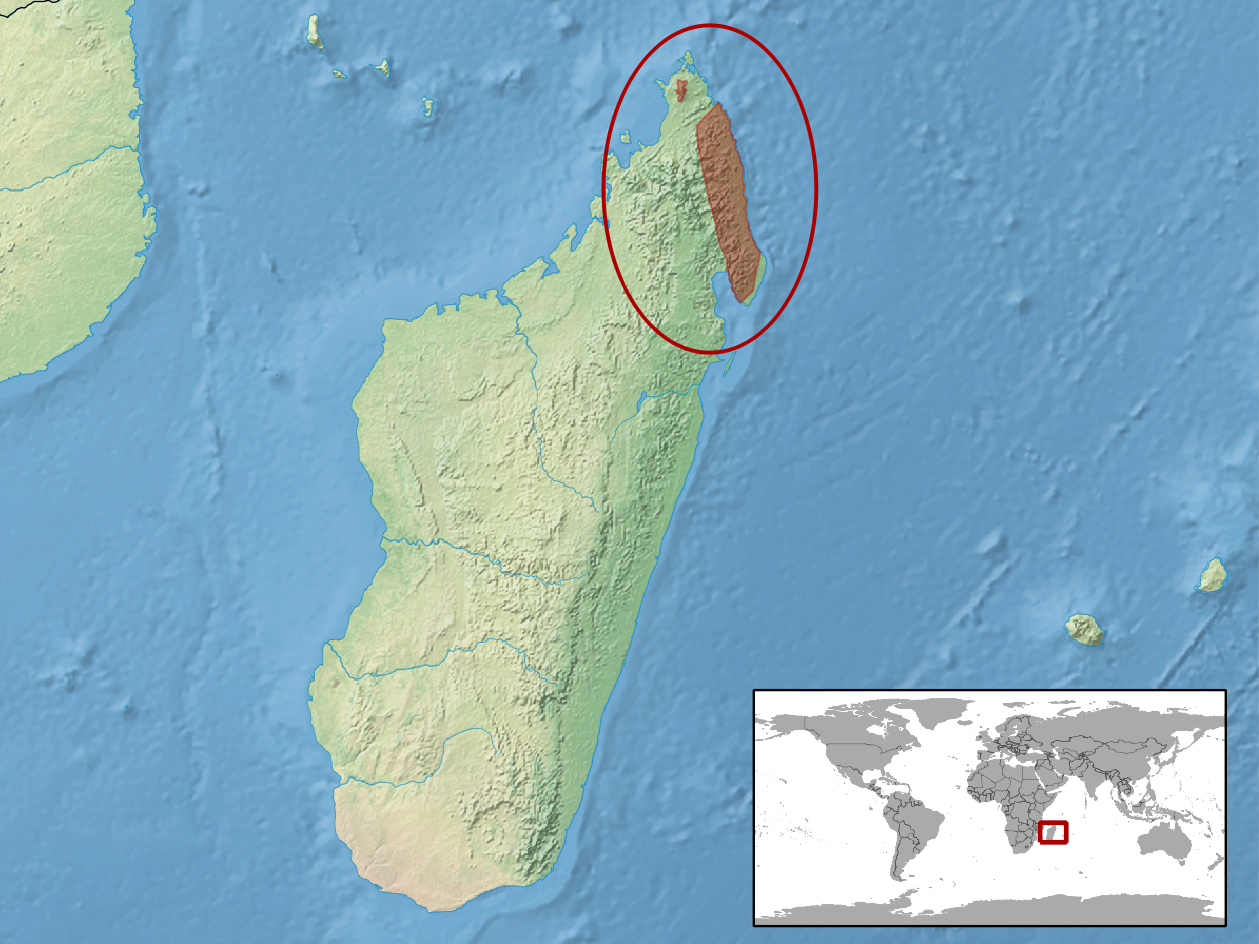

= Giant leaf-tail gecko =

Species of lizard

The giant leaf-tail gecko (Uroplatus giganteus) is a species of lizard in the family Gekkonidae. It is endemic to Madagascar. It can reach a snout–vent length of 20 cm and a total length of 32.2 cm. The giant leaf-tail gecko has eyes approximately 350x more sensitive to light than a humans, allowing it to see in color at night.
