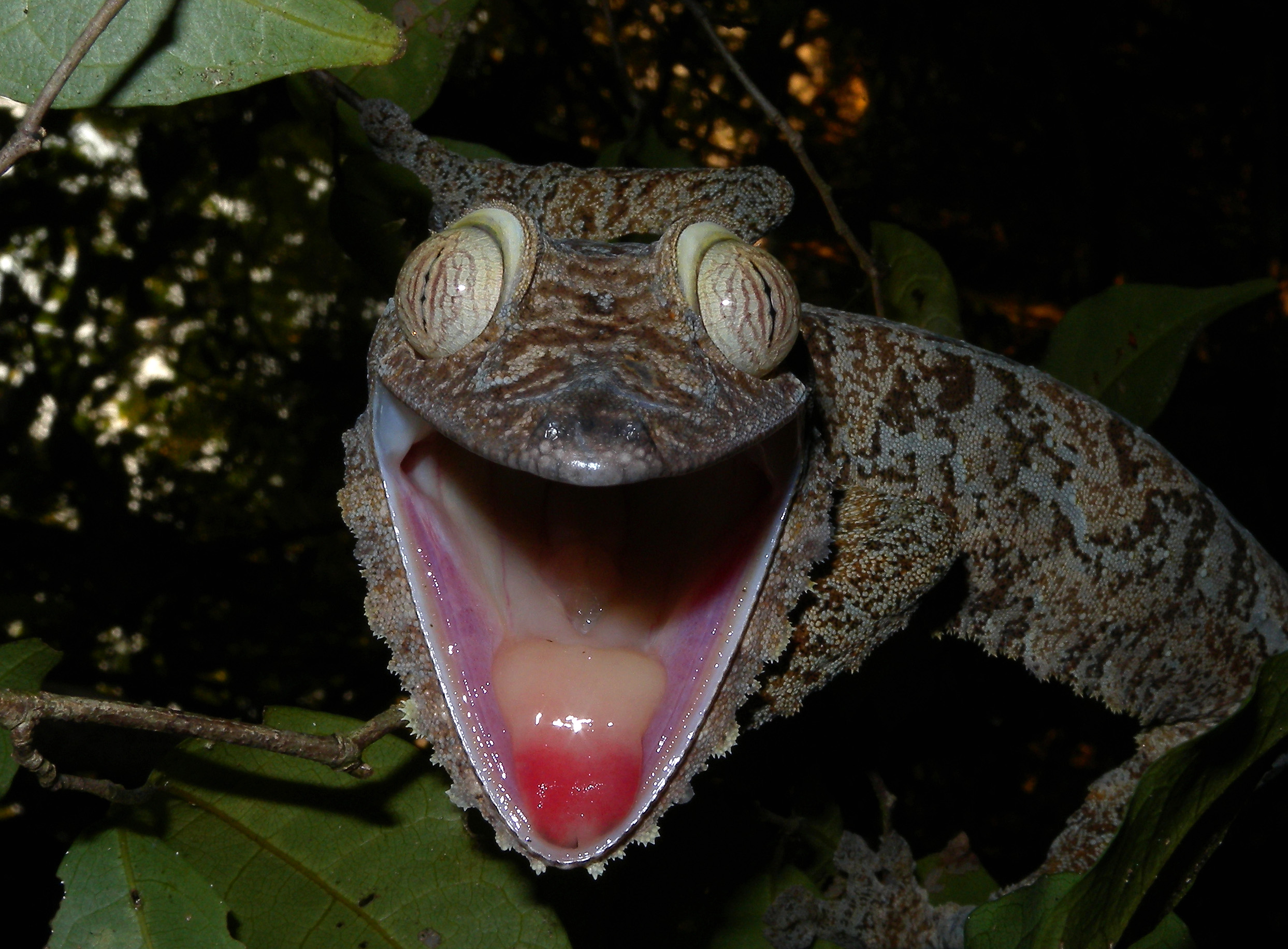
- A giant leaf-tailed gecko on the island of Nosy Mangabe off Madagascar

Conservation status
- Least Concern (IUCN 3.1)

Scientific classification
- Kingdom: Animalia
- Phylum: Chordata
- Class: Reptilia
- Order: Squamata
- Suborder: Gekkota
- Family: Gekkonidae
- Genus: Uroplatus
- Species: U. fimbriatus

Binomial name
- Uroplatus fimbriatus (Schneider, 1797)
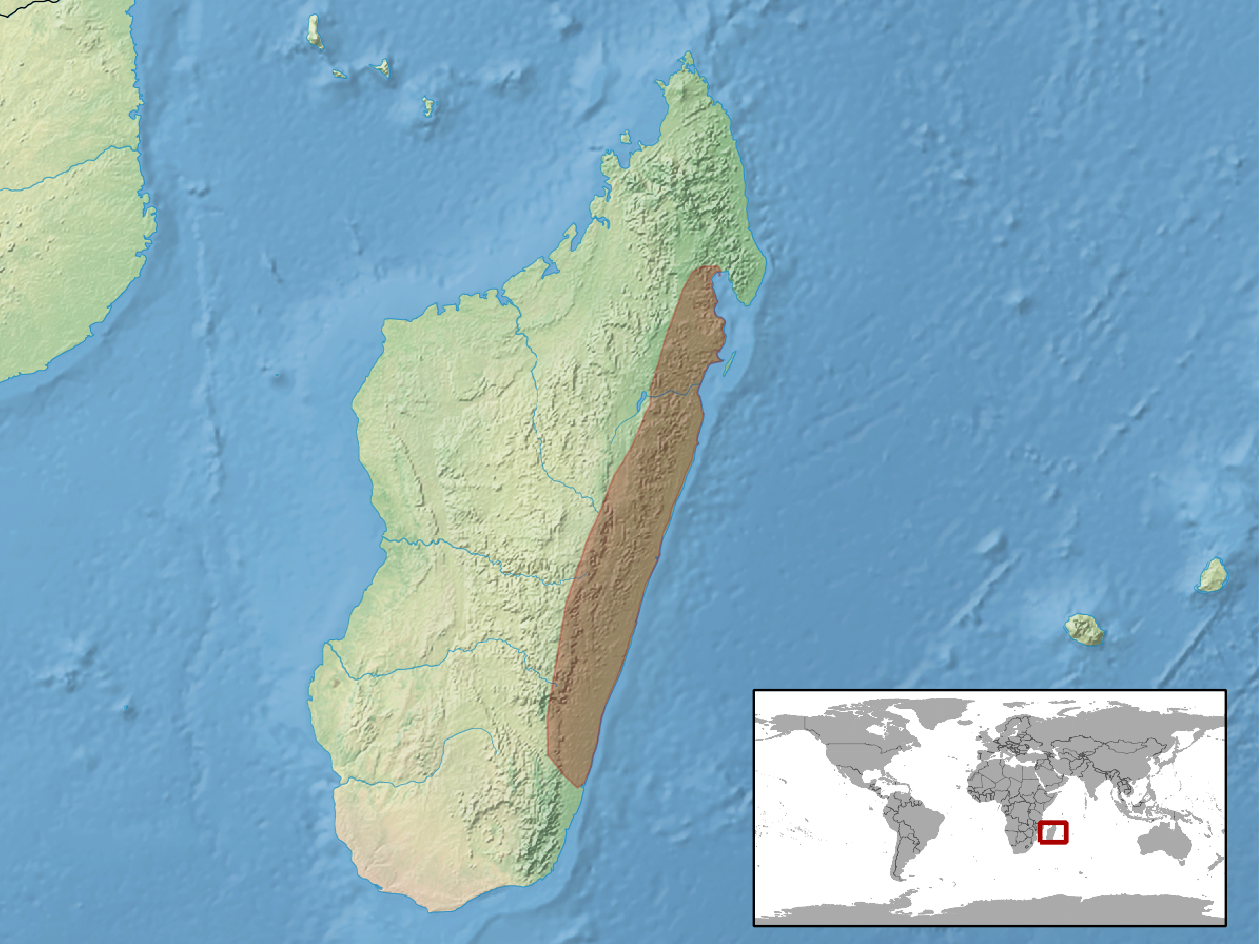

Synonyms
- Stellio fimbriatus Schneider, 1797

= Common flat-tail gecko =

Species of lizard

The common flat-tail gecko (Uroplatus fimbriatus) is a gecko endemic to Madagascar. It is found in eastern Madagascar and on the islands Nosy Bohara and Nosy Mangabe. These geckos live in tropical rain forests. They reach a total length of 330 mm.

== Etymology ==
The generic name, Uroplatus, is a Latinization of two Greek words: "ourá" (οὐρά) meaning "tail" and "platys" (πλατύς) meaning "flat". Its specific name fimbriatus is the Latin word for "fringed" based upon the gecko's unique appearance of fringed skin.

== Description ==
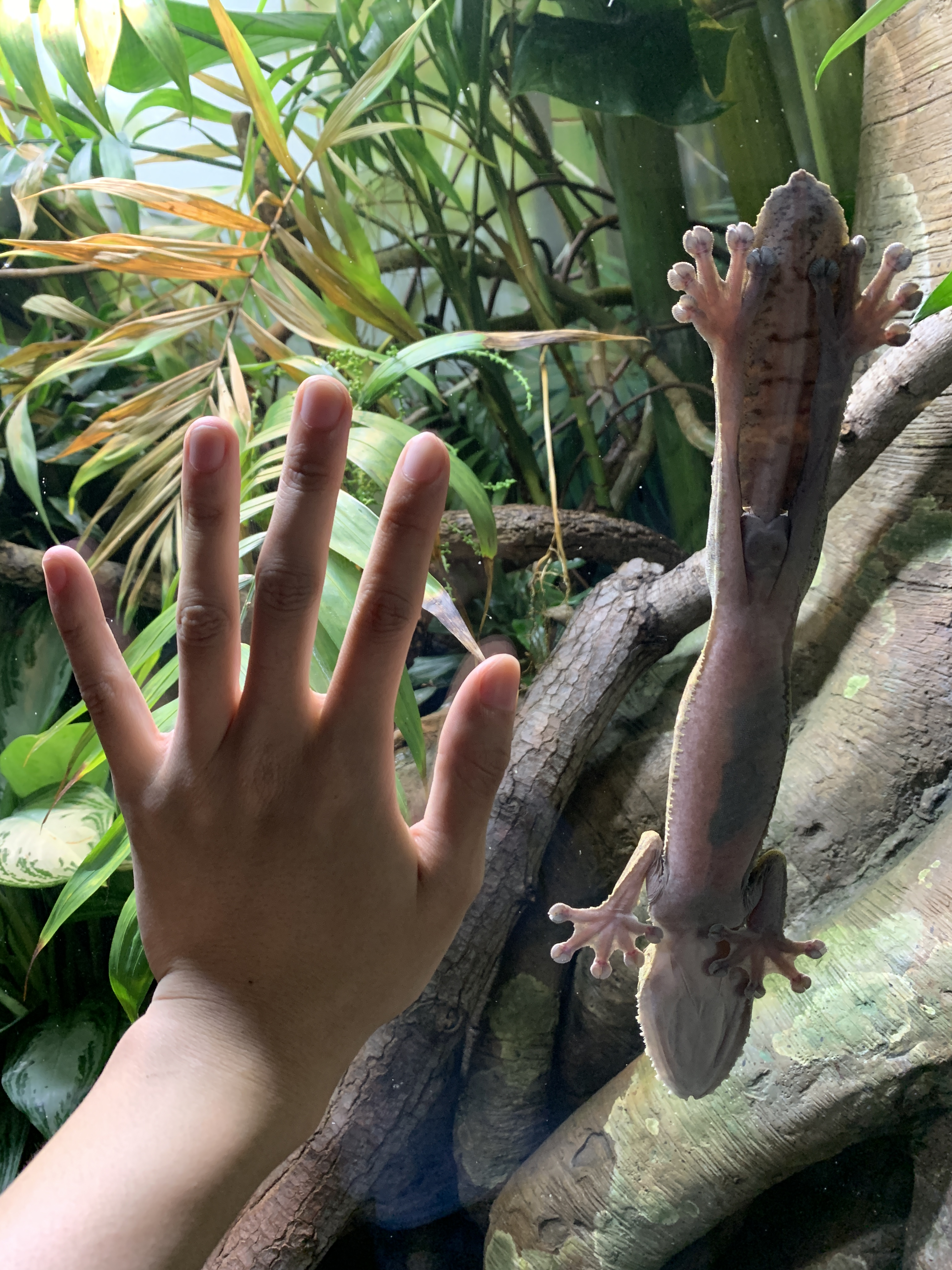
Size compared to hand. At the Bronx Zoo.

It is a large nocturnal gecko. Because the eyes are extremely sensitive to light, 350 times more sensitive than the human eye, the species is able to see in colors even at night. By day it plasters itself to a small tree trunk and rests head down. If disturbed it will raise its tail and head, open its mouth and scream.

== Threats ==
Habitat destruction and deforestation in Madagascar is the primary threat to this animal's future as well as collection for the pet trade. The World Wide Fund for Nature (WWF) lists all of the Uroplatus species on their "Top ten most wanted species list" of animals threatened by illegal wildlife trade, because of it "being captured and sold at alarming rates for the international pet trade". It is a CITES Appendix 2 protected animal. However, the International Union for Conservation of Nature considers the commercial export as likely sustainable.

== Gallery ==
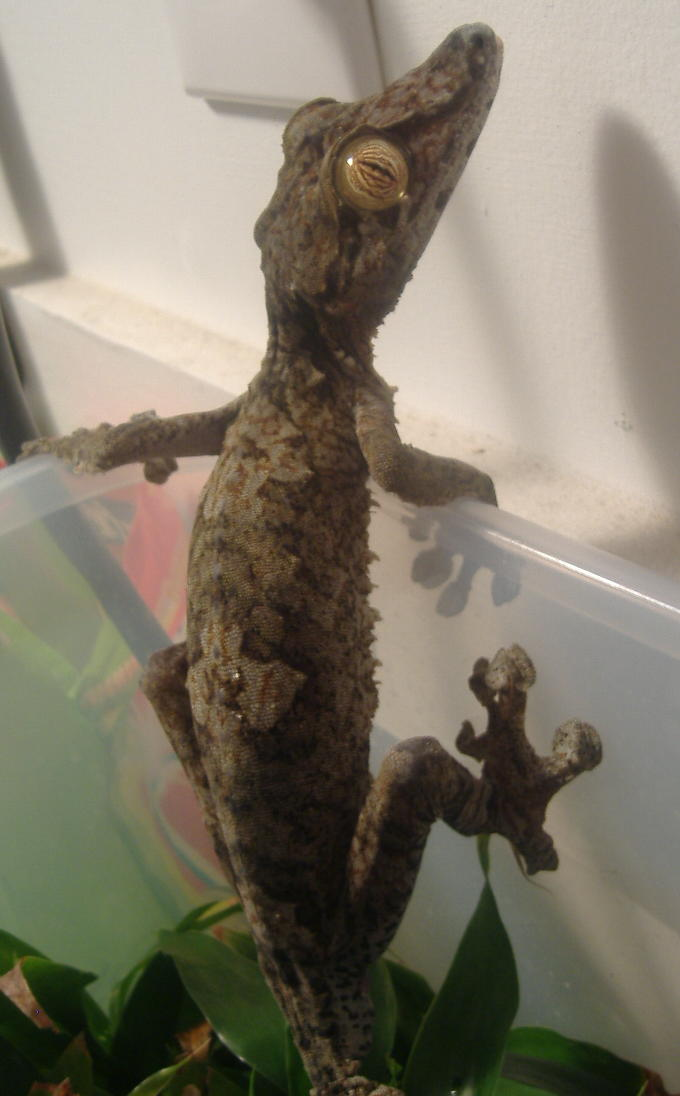
Giant Leaf tail Gecko

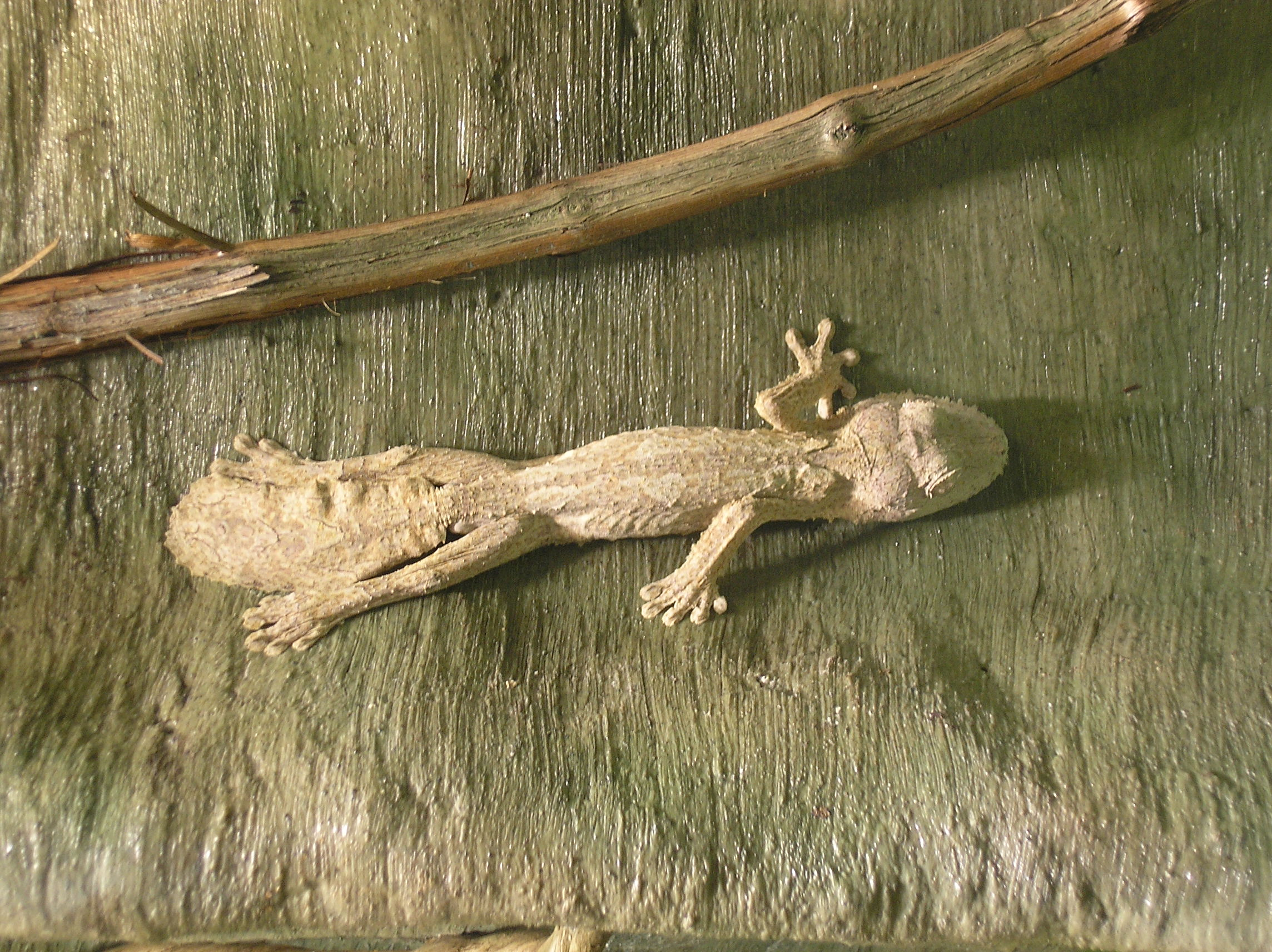
Leaf Tailed Gecko

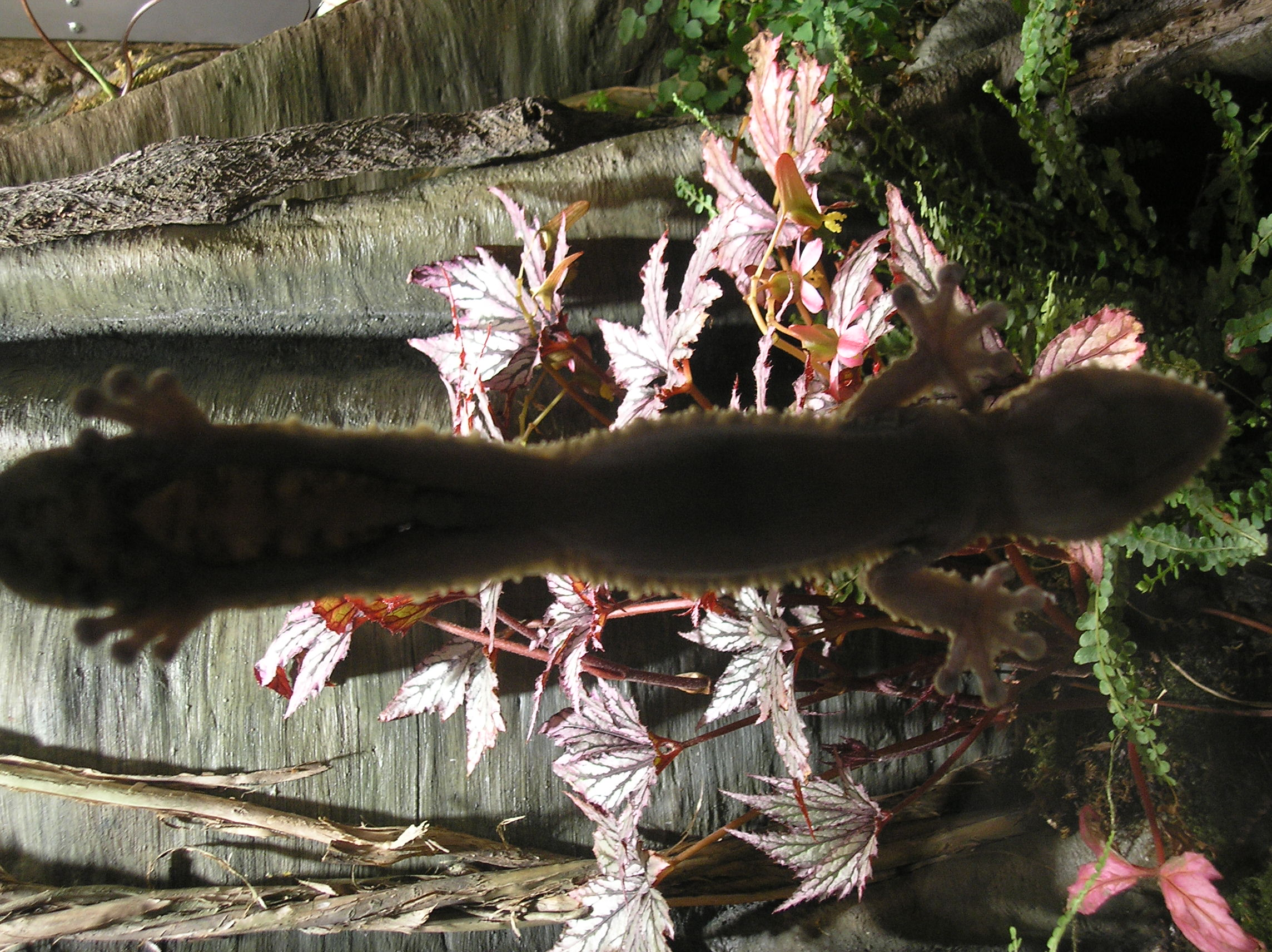
Leaf Tailed Gecko - from below

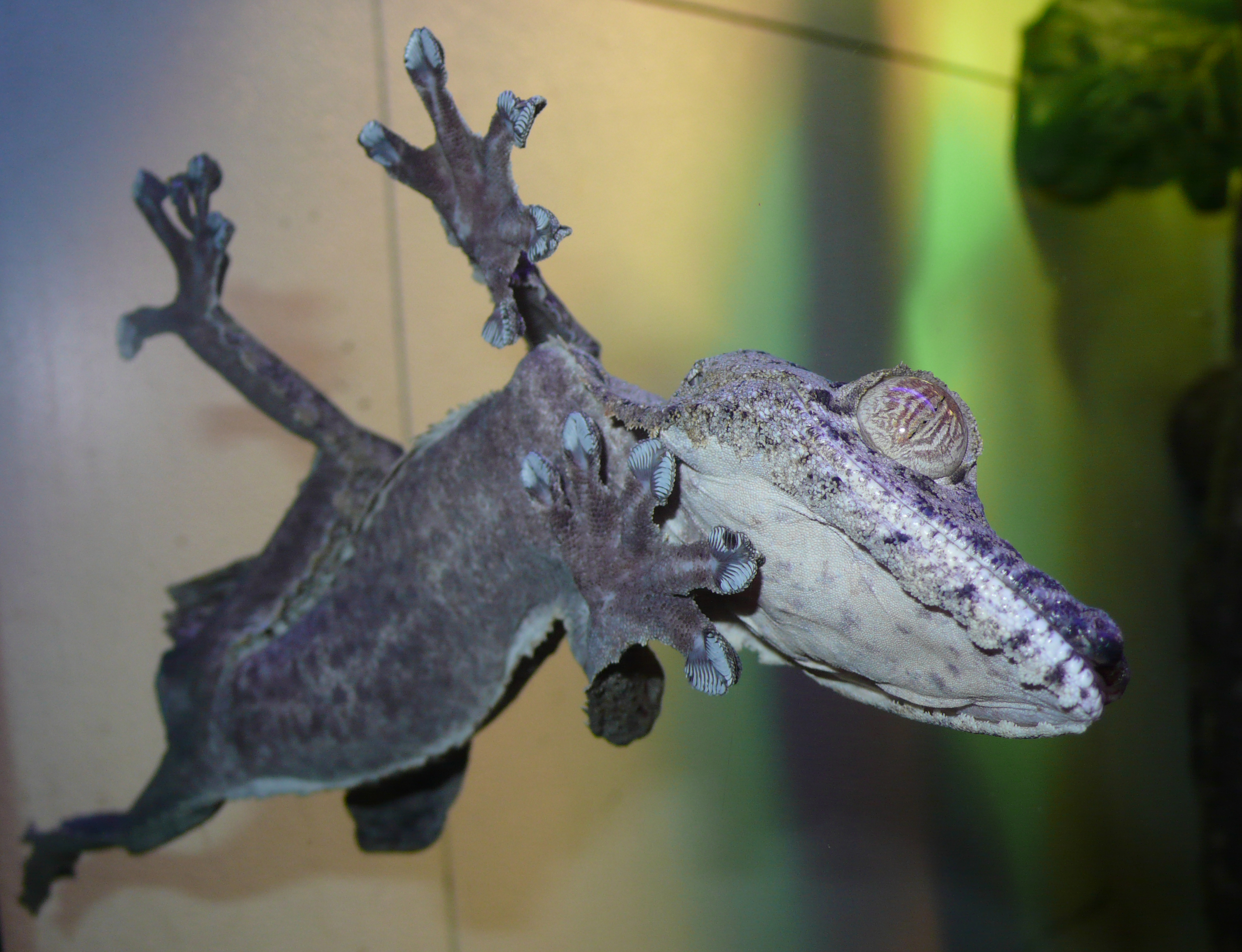
The underside of the Leaf Tailed Gecko clinging to glass

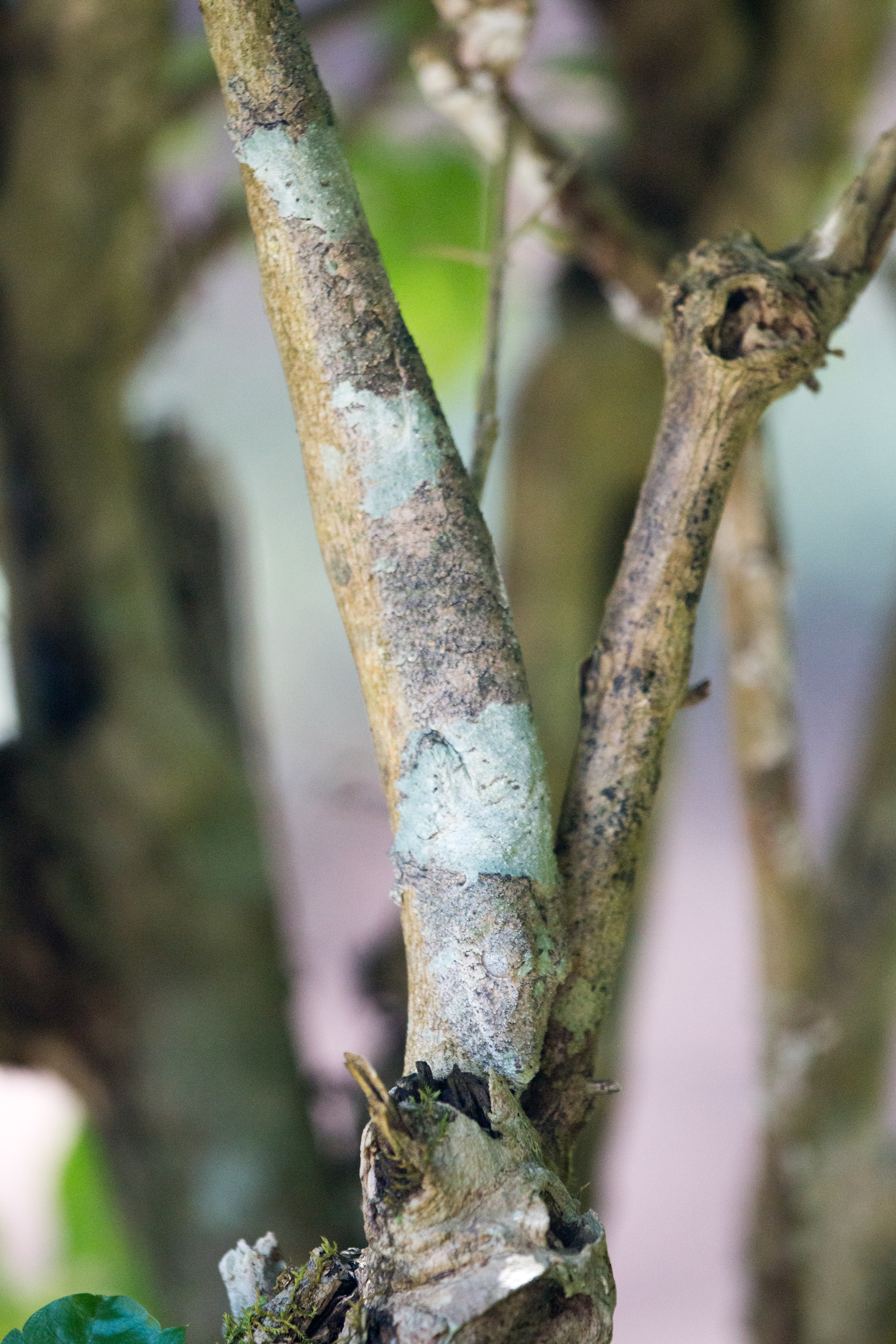
Camouflage of the gecko
