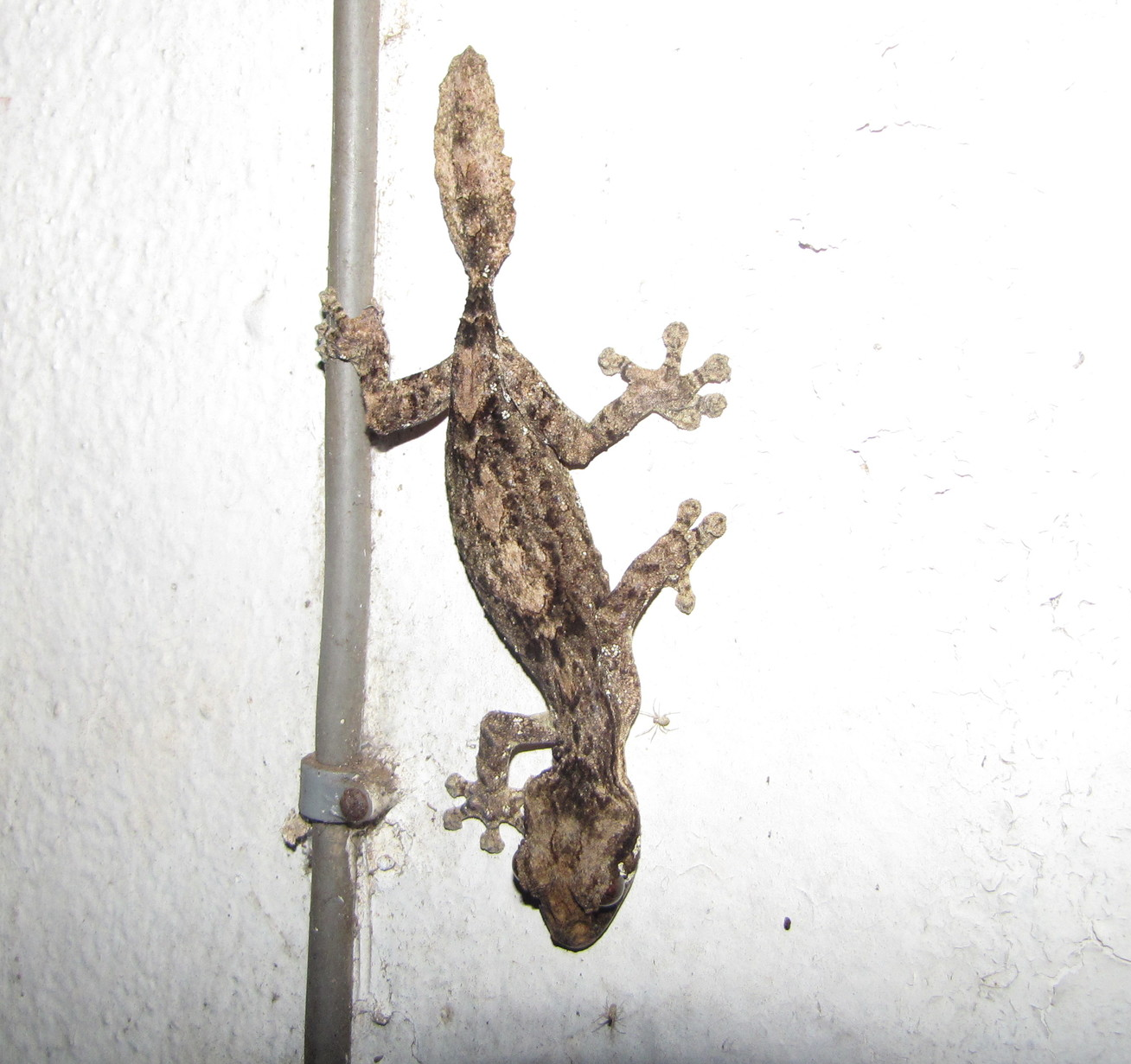

Conservation status
- Near Threatened (IUCN 3.1)

Scientific classification
- Kingdom: Animalia
- Phylum: Chordata
- Class: Reptilia
- Order: Squamata
- Suborder: Gekkota
- Family: Gekkonidae
- Genus: Uroplatus
- Species: U. alluaudi

Binomial name
- Uroplatus alluaudi Mocquard, 1894
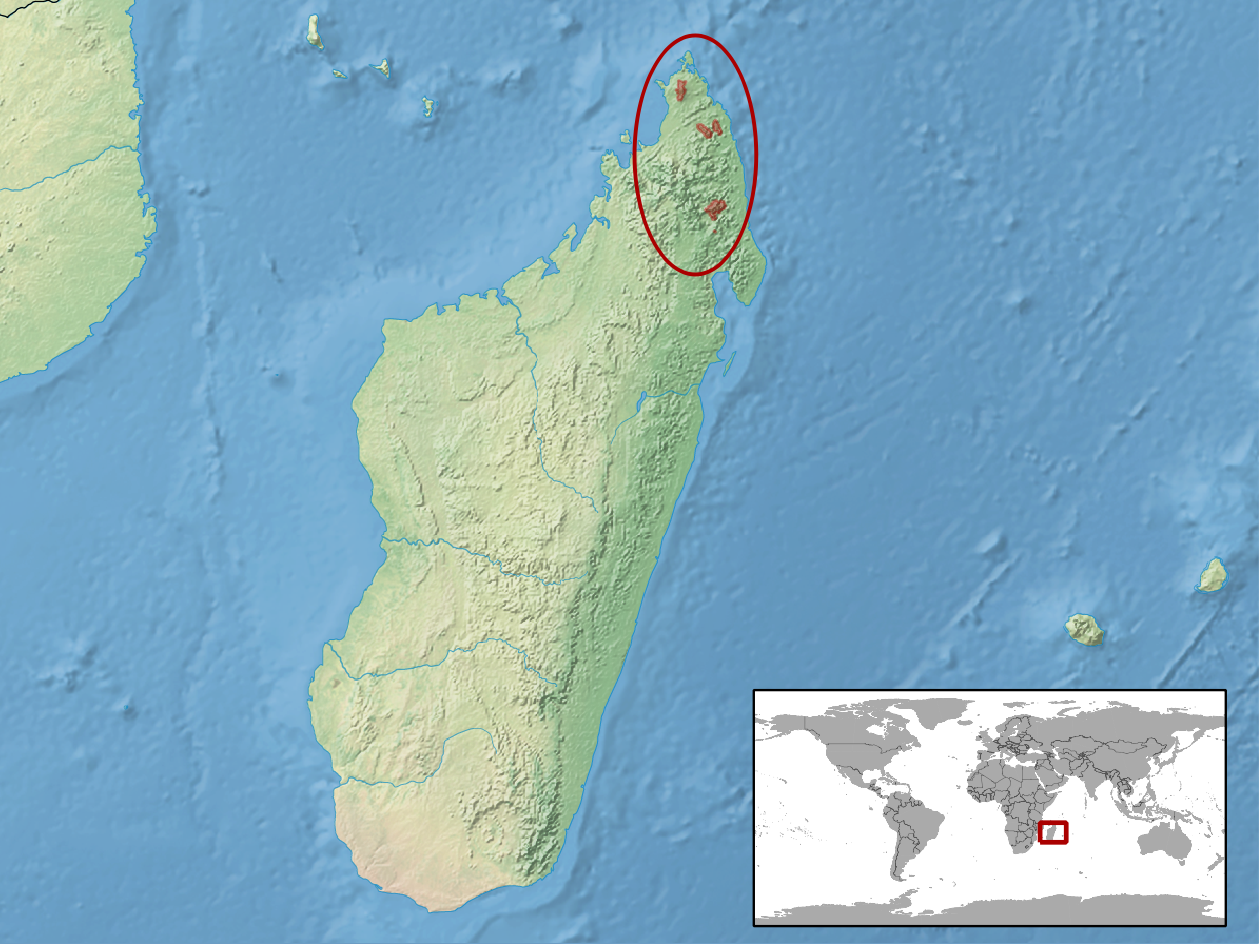

= Uroplatus alluaudi =

Species of lizard

Uroplatus alluaudi, also known commonly as the northern flat-tail gecko and the northern leaf-tail gecko, is a species of lizard in the family Gekkonidae. The species is endemic to Madagascar.

== Etymology ==
The specific name, alluaudi, is in honor of French entomologist Charles Alluad.

== Geographic range ==
U. alluaudi is found in northern Madagascar.

== Habitat ==
The preferred natural habitat of U. alluaudi is forest, at altitudes of 650–950 m (2,130–3,120 ft).

== Reproduction ==
U. alluaudi is oviparous.
