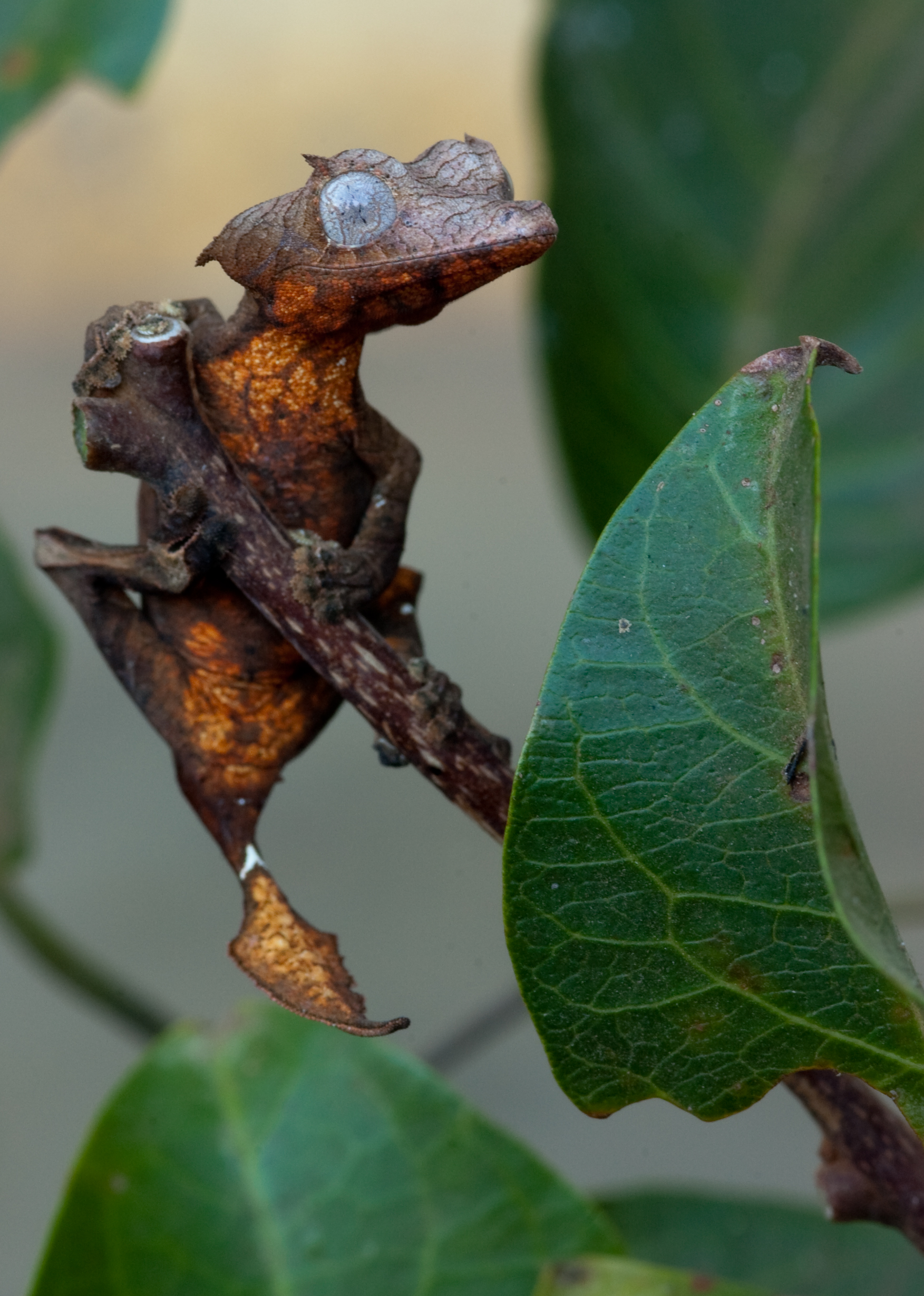

Conservation status
- Vulnerable (IUCN 3.1)

Scientific classification
- Kingdom: Animalia
- Phylum: Chordata
- Class: Reptilia
- Order: Squamata
- Suborder: Gekkota
- Family: Gekkonidae
- Genus: Uroplatus
- Species: U. ebenaui

Binomial name
- Uroplatus ebenaui (Boettger, 1879)
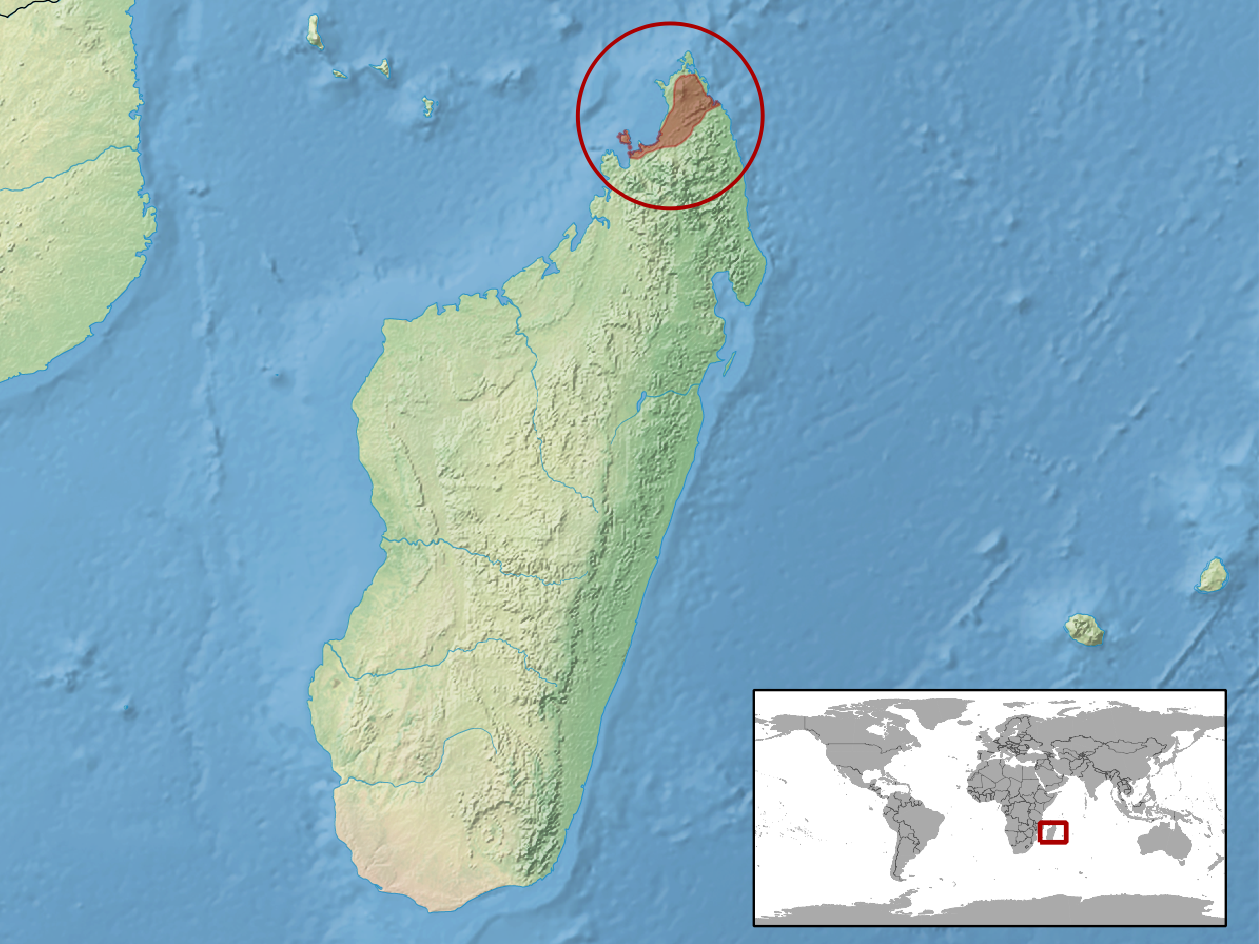

Synonyms
- Uroplates ebenaui Boettger, 1879; Uroplates boettgeri Fischer, 1884; Uroplatus ebenaui — Angel, 1942

= Uroplatus ebenaui =

Species of lizard

Uroplatus ebenaui, commonly known as Ebenau's leaf-tailed gecko, the Nosy Be flat-tail gecko, and the spearpoint leaf-tail gecko, is a species of lizard in the family Gekkonidae. The species is native to Madagascar.

== Geographic range ==
U. ebenaui is found on Nosy Bé island and in eastern and northern Madagascar, at altitudes from sea level to 500 m (1,600 ft).

== Etymology ==
The specific name, ebenaui, is in honor of German zoologist Karl Ebenau.

== Habitat ==
U. ebenaui lives in tropical rain forests and dry deciduous forests.

== Description ==
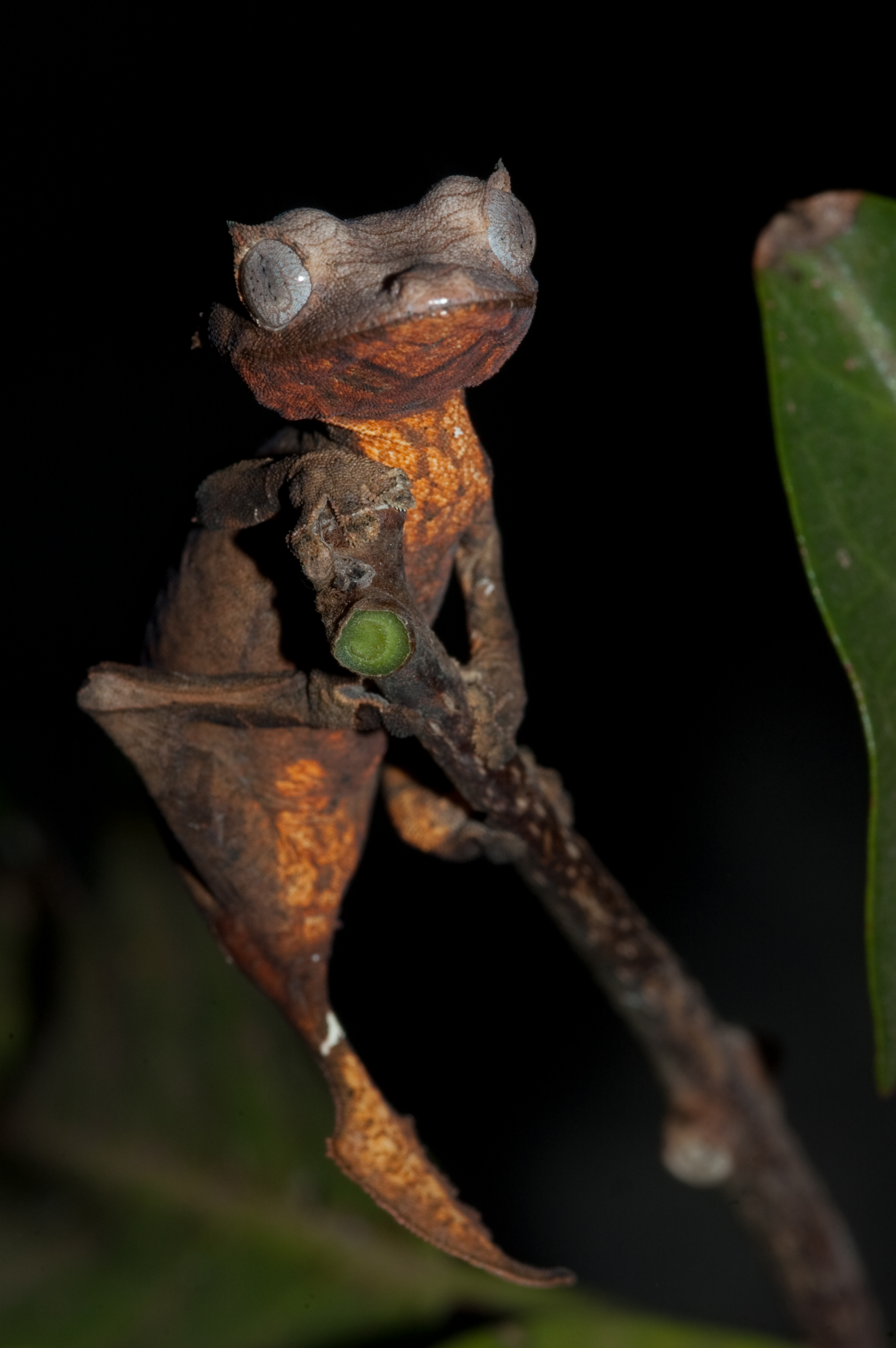

U. ebenaui is the smallest species of Uroplatus and can reach a total length (including tail) of 4 inches.

== Behavior ==
U. ebenaui is arboreal and nocturnal. This gecko eats insects at night and is inactive during the day. Additionally, it sleeps flattened against tree trunks, camouflaged with the bark.

== Reproduction ==
U. ebenaui is oviparous. Clutch size is two spherical eggs, which are laid on the ground.

== Taxonomy ==
Uroplatus ebenaui may be a complex of species.
