= List of reptiles of Madagascar =

This is a list of reptiles in Madagascar.

Total number of species = 406

== Snakes ==
=== Boas (Boidae) ===
- Acrantophis madagascariensis (Duméril & Bibron, 1844)
- Acrantophis dumerili (Jan, 1860)
- Sanzinia madagascariensis (Duméril & Bibron, 1844)

=== Elapidae ===
- Hydrophis platurus (Linnaeus, 1766)

=== Psammophiidae ===
- Mimophis mahfalensis (Grandidier, 1867)
- Mimophis occultus Ruane, Myers, Lo, Yuen, Welt, Juman, Futterman, Nussbaum, Schneider, Burbrink & Raxworthy, 2017

=== Pseudoxyrhophiidae ===
- Alluaudina bellyi (Mocquard, 1894)
- Alluaudina mocquardi (Angel, 1939)
- Brygophis coulangesi (Domergue, 1988)
- Compsophis infralineatus (Günther, 1882)
- Compsophis boulengeri (Peracca, 1892)
- Compsophis albiventris (Mocquard, 1894)
- Compsophis vinckei (Domergue, 1988)
- Compsophis laphystius (Cadle, 1996)
- Compsophis zeny (Cadle, 1996)
- Compsophis fatsibe (Mercurio & Andreone, 2005)
- Dromicodryas bernieri (Duméril & Bibron, 1854)
- Dromicodryas quadrilineatus (Duméril & Bibron, 1854)
- Exallodontophis albignaci (Domergue, 1984)
- Heteroliodon occipitalis (Boulenger, 1896)
- Heteroliodon lava (Raxworthy & Nussbaum, 2000)
- Heteroliodon fohy (Glaw, Vences & Nussbaum, 2005)
- Ithycyphus goudoti (Schlegel, 1837)
- Ithycyphus miniatus (Schlegel, 1837)
- Ithycyphus oursi (Domergue, 1986)
- Ithycyphus perineti (Domergue, 1986)
- Ithycyphus blanci (Domergue, 1988)
- Langaha madagascariensis (Bonnaterre, 1790)
- Langaha alluaudi (Mocquard, 1901)
- Langaha pseudoalluaudi (Domergue, 1988)
- Leioheterodon madagascariensis (Duméril & Bibron, 1854)
- Leioheterodon modestus (Günther, 1863)
- Leioheterodon geayi (Mocquard, 1905)
- Liophidium rhodogaster (Schlegel, 1837)
- Liophidium torquatum (Boulenger, 1888)
- Liophidium trilineatum (Boulenger, 1896)
- Liophidium vaillanti (Mocquard, 1901)
- Liophidium apperti (Domergue, 1984)
- Liophidium chabaudi (Domergue, 1984)
- Liophidium therezieni (Domergue, 1984)
- Liophidium maintikibo (Franzen, Jones, Raselimanana, Nagy, C'Cruze, Glaw & Vences, 2009)
- Liophidium pattoni (Vieites, Ratsoavina, Randrianiaina, Nagy, Glaw & Vences, 2010)
- Liopholidophis sexlineatus (Günther, 1882)
- Liopholidophis varius (Fischer, 1884)
- Liopholidophis dolicocercus (Peracca, 1892)
- Liopholidophis grandidieri (Mocquard, 1904)
- Liopholidophis rhadinaea (Cadle, 1996)
- Liopholidophis dimorphus (Glaw, Nagy, Franzen & Vences, 2007)
- Liopholidophis baderi (Glaw, Kucharzewski, Nagy, Hawlitschek & Vences, 2013)
- Liopholidophis oligolepis (Glaw, Kucharzewski, Nagy, Hawlitschek & Vences, 2013)
- Lycodryas gaimardi (Schlegel, 1837)
- Lycodryas granuliceps (Boettger, 1877)
- Lycodryas guentheri (Boulenger, 1896)
- Lycodryas inornatus (Boulenger, 1896)
- Lycodryas carleti (Domergue, 1995)
- Lycodryas citrinus (Domergue, 1995)
- Lycodryas inopinae (Domergue, 1995)
- Lycodryas pseudogranuliceps (Domergue, 1995)
- Madagascarophis colubrinus (Schlegel, 1837)
- Madagascarophis meridionalis (Domergue, 1987)
- Madagascarophis ocellatus (Domergue, 1987)
- Madagascarophis fuchsi (Glaw, Kucharzewski, Nagy, Köhler & Vences, 2013)
- Micropisthodon ochraceus (Mocquard, 1894)
- Pararhadinaea melanogaster (Boettger, 1898)
- Parastenophis betsileanus (Günther, 1880)
- Phisalixella arctifasciata (Duméril & Bibron, 1854)
- Phisalixella variabilis (Boulenger, 1896)
- Phisalixella iarakaensis (Domergue, 1994)
- Phisalixella tulearensis (Domergue, 1995)
- Pseudoxyrhopus heterurus (Jan, 1863)
- Pseudoxyrhopus microps (Günther, 1881)
- Pseudoxyrhopus quinquelineatus (Günther, 1881)
- Pseudoxyrhopus imerinae (Günther, 1890)
- Pseudoxyrhopus tritaeniatus (Mocquard, 1894)
- Pseudoxyrhopus ambreensis (Mocquard, 1895)
- Pseudoxyrhopus ankafinaensis (Raxworthy & Nussbaum, 1994)
- Pseudoxyrhopus kely (Raxworthy & Nussbaum, 1994)
- Pseudoxyrhopus sokosoko (Raxworthy & Nussbaum, 1994)
- Pseudoxyrhopus analabe (Raxworthy', Andreone & Nussbaum, 1998)
- Pseudoxyrhopus oblectator (Cadle, 1999)
- Thamnosophis lateralis (Duméril & Bibron, 1854)
- Thamnosophis stumpffi (Boettger, 1881)
- Thamnosophis infrasignatus (Günther, 1882)
- Thamnosophis epistibes (Cadle, 1996)
- Thamnosophis martae (Glaw, Vences & Franzen, 2005)
- Thamnosophis mavotenda (Glaw, Nagy, Köhler, Franzen & Vences, 2009)

=== Typhlopidae ===
- Indotyphlops braminus (Daudun, 1803)
- Madatyphlops arenarius (Grandidier, 1872)
- Madatyphlops madagascariensis (Boettger, 1877)
- Madatyphlops mucronatus (Boettger, 1880)
- Madatyphlops reuteri (Boettger, 1881)
- Madatyphlops boettgeri (Boulenger, 1893)
- Madatyphlops decorsei (Mocquard, 1901)
- Madatyphlops microcephalus (Werner, 1909)
- Madatyphlops ocularis (Parker, 1927)
- Madatyphlops domerguei (Roux-Estève, 1980)
- Madatyphlops andasibensis (Wallach & Glaw, 2009)
- Madatyphlops rajeryi (Renoult & Raselimanana, 2009)

=== Xenotyphlopidae ===
- Xenotyphlops grandidieri (Mocquard, 1905)
- Xenotyphlops mocquardi (Wallach, Mecurio & Andreone, 2007)

== Lizards ==
=== Agamids (Agamidae) ===
- Agama agama (Linnaeus, 1758)

=== Chameleons (Chamaeleonidae) ===
- Brookesia superciliaris (Kuhl, 1820)
- Brookesia ebenaui (Boettger, 1880)
- Brookesia minima (Boettger, 1893)
- Brookesia stumpffi (Boettger, 1894)
- Brookesia tuberculata (Mocquard, 1894)
- Brookesia dentata (Mocquard, 1900)
- Brookesia perarmata (Angel, 1933)
- Brookesia decaryi (Angel, 1939)
- Brookesia vadoni (Brygoo & Domergue, 1968)
- Brookesia thieli (Brygoo & Domergue, 1969)
- Brookesia karchei (Brygoo, Blanc & Domergue, 1970)
- Brookesia lambertoni (Brygoo & Domergue, 1970)
- Brookesia therezieni (Brygoo & Domergue, 1970)
- Brookesia betschi (Brygoo, Blanc & Domergue, 1974)
- Brookesia griveaudi (Brygoo, Blanc & Domergue, 1974)
- Brookesia peyrierasi (Brygoo & Domergue, 1974)
- Brookesia ramanantsoai (Brygoo & Domergue, 1975)
- Brookesia bonsi (Ramanantsoa, 1980)
- Brookesia valerieae (Raxworthy, 1991)
- Brookesia ambreensis (Raxworthy & Nussbaum, 1995)
- Brookesia antakarana (Raxworthy & Nussbaum, 1995)
- Brookesia bekolosy (Raxworthy & Nussbaum, 1995)
- Brookesia brygooi (Raxworthy & Nussbaum, 1995)
- Brookesia lineata (Raxworthy & Nussbaum, 1995)
- Brookesia exarmata (Schimmenti & Jesu, 1996)
- Brookesia brunoi (Crottini, Miralles, Glaw, Harris, Lima & Vences, 2012)
- Brookesia confidens (Glaw, Köhler, Towsend & Vences, 2012)
- Brookesia desperata (Glaw, Köhler, Towsend & Vences, 2012)
- Brookesia micra (Glaw, Köhler, Towsend & Vences, 2012)
- Brookesia tristis (Glaw, Köhler, Towsend & Vences, 2012)
- Calumma parsonii (Cuvier, 1824)
- Calumma cucullatum (Gray, 1831)
- Calumma nasutum (Duméril & Bibron, 1836)
- Calumma gallus (Günther, 1877)
- Calumma brevicorne (Günther, 1879)
- Calumma globifer (Günther, 1879)
- Calumma malthe (Günther, 1879)
- Calumma furcifer (Vaillant & Grandidier, 1880)
- Calumma oshaughnessyi (Günther, 1881)
- Calumma boettgeri (Boulenger, 1888)
- Calumma gastrotaenia (Boulenger, 1888)
- Calumma fallax (Mocquard, 1900)
- Calumma guibei (Hillenius, 1959)
- Calumma tsaratananense (Brygoo & Domergue, 1967)
- Calumma marojezense (Brygoo, Blanc & Domergue, 1970)
- Calumma andringitraense (Brygoo, Blanc & Domergue, 1972)
- Calumma capuroni (Brygoo, Blanc & Domergue, 1972)
- Calumma hilleniusi (Brygoo, Blanc & Domergue, 1973)
- Calumma ambreense (Ramanantsoa, 1974)
- Calumma guillaumeti (Brygoo, Blanc & Domergue, 1974)
- Calumma peyrierasi (Brygoo, Blanc & Domergue, 1974)
- Calumma glawi (Böhme, 1997)
- Calumma vatosoa (Andreone, Mattioli, Jesu & Randrianirina, 2001)
- Calumma vencesi (Andreone, Mattioli, Jesu & Randrianirina, 2001)
- Calumma amber (Raxworthy & Nussbaum, 2006)
- Calumma crypticum (Raxworthy & Nussbaum, 2006)
- Calumma hafahafa (Raxworthy & Nussbaum, 2006)
- Calumma jejy (Raxworthy & Nussbaum, 2006)
- Calumma peltierorum (Raxworthy & Nussbaum, 2006)
- Calumma tsycorne (Raxworthy & Nussbaum, 2006)
- Calumma tarzan (Gehring, Pabijan, Ratsoavina, Köhler, Vences & Glaw, 2010)
- Calumma vohibola (Gehring, Ratsoavina, Vences & Glaw, 2011)
- Furcifer bifidus (Brongniart, 1800)
- Furcifer pardalis (Cuvier, 1829)
- Furcifer verrucosus (Cuvier, 1829)
- Furcifer lateralis (Gray, 1831)
- Furcifer rhinoceratus (Gray, 1845)
- Furcifer balteatus (Duméril & Bibron, 1851)
- Furcifer antimena (Grandidier, 1872)
- Furcifer campani (Grandidier, 1872)
- Furcifer labordi (Grandidier, 1872)
- Furcifer minor (Günther, 1879)
- Furcifer willsii (Günther, 1890)
- Furcifer oustaleti (Mocquard, 1894)
- Furcifer petteri (Brygoo & Domergue, 1966)
- Furcifer angeli (Brygoo & Domergue, 1968)
- Furcifer belalandaensis (Brygoo & Domergue, 1970)
- Furcifer major (Brygoo, 1971)
- Furcifer tuzetae (Brygoo, Bourgat & Domergue, 1972)
- Furcifer nicosiai (Jesu, Mattioli & Schimmenti, 1999)
- Furcifer timoni (Glaw, Köhler & Vences, 2009)
- Furcifer viridis (Florio, Ingram, Rakotondravony, Louis jr. & Raxworthy, 2012)
- Palleon nasus (Boulenger, 1887)
- Palleon lolontany (Raxworthy & Nussbaum, 1995)

=== Gekkonidae (infraorder: Gekkota) ===
- Blaesodactylus boivini (Duméril, 1856)
- Blaesodactylus sakalava (Grandidier, 1867)
- Blaesodactylus antongilensis (Böhme & Meier, 1980)
- Blaesodactylus ambonihazo (Bauer, Glaw, Gehring & Vences, 2011)
- Ebenavia inunguis (Boettger, 1878)
- Ebenavia maintimainty (Raxworthy & Nussbaum, 1998)
- Geckolepis typica (Grandidier, 1867)
- Geckolepis maculata (Peters, 1880)
- Geckolepis polylepis (Boettger, 1893)
- Gehyra mutilata (Wiegmann, 1834)
- Hemidactylus frenatus (Schlegel, 1836)
- Hemidactylus mercatorius (Gray, 1842)
- Hemidactylus platycephalus (Peters, 1854)
- Lygodactylus tolampyae (Grandidier, 1872)
- Lygodactylus madagascariensis (Boettger, 1881)
- Lygodactylus bivittis (Peters, 1883)
- Lygodactylus pictus (Peters, 1883)
- Lygodactylus miops (Günther, 1891)
- Lygodactylus verticillatus (Mocquard, 1895)
- Lygodactylus heterurus (Boettger, 1913)
- Lygodactylus decaryi (Angel, 1930)
- Lygodactylus mirabilis (Pasteur, 1962)
- Lygodactylus arnoulti (Pasteur, 1965)
- Lygodactylus guibei (Pasteur, 1965)
- Lygodactylus klemmeri (Pasteur, 1965)
- Lygodactylus montanus (Pasteur, 1965)
- Lygodactylus ornatus (Pasteur, 1965)
- Lygodactylus tuberosus (Mertens, 1965)
- Lygodactylus blanci (Pasteur, 1967)
- Lygodactylus expectatus (Pasteur & Blanc, 1967)
- Lygodactylus rarus (Pasteur & Blanc, 1973)
- Lygodactylus pauliani (Pasteur & Blanc, 1991)
- Lygodactylus blancae (Pasteur, 1995)
- Lygodactylus intermedius (Pasteur, 1995)
- Lygodactylus roavolana (Puente, Glaw, Vieites & Vences, 2009)
- Matoatoa brevipes (Mocquard, 1900)
- Matoatoa spannringi (Raxworthy & Nussbaum & Pronk, 1998)
- Paragehyra petiti (Angel, 1929)
- Paragehyra gabriellae (Raxworthy & Nussbaum, 1994)
- Paroedura picta (Peters, 1854)
- Paroedura androyensis (Grandidier, 1867)
- Paroedura stumpffi (Boettger, 1879)
- Paroedura oviceps (Boettger, 1881)
- Paroedura gracilis (Boulenger, 1896)
- Paroedura bastardi (Mocquard, 1900)
- Paroedura homalorhina (Angel, 1936)
- Paroedura masobe (Raxworthy & Nussbaum, 1994)
- Paroedura manongavato (Piccoli, Belluardo, Lobón-Rovira, Alves, Rasoazanany, Andreone, Rosa & Crottini, 2023)
- Paroedura ibityensis (Rösler & Krüger, 1998)
- Paroedura karstophila (Raxworthy & Nussbaum, 2000)
- Paroedura maingoka (Raxworthy & Nussbaum, 2000)
- Paroedura rennerae (Miralles, Bruy, Crottini, Rakotoarison, Ratsoavina, Scherz, Schmidt, Köhler, Glaw & Vences, 2021)
- Paroedura tanjaka (Raxworthy & Nussbaum, 2000)
- Paroedura vahiny (Raxworthy & Nussbaum, 2000)
- Paroedura vazimba (Raxworthy & Nussbaum, 2000)
- Paroedura lohatsara (Glaw, Vences & Nussbaum, 2001)
- Phelsuma cepediana (Milbert, 1812)
- Phelsuma madagascariensis (Gray, 1831)
- Phelsuma lineata (Gray, 1842)
- Phelsuma mutabilis (Grandidier, 1869)
- Phelsuma grandis (Gray, 1870)
- Phelsuma laticauda (Boettger, 1880)
- Phelsuma dubia (Boettger, 1881)
- Phelsuma quadriocellata (Peters, 1883)
- Phelsuma abbotti (Stejneger, 1893)
- Phelsuma breviceps (Boettger, 1894)
- Phelsuma standingi (Methuen & Hewitt, 1913)
- Phelsuma guttata (Kaudern, 1922)
- Phelsuma barbouri (Loveridge, 1942)
- Phelsuma kochi (Mertens, 1954)
- Phelsuma flavigularis (Mertens, 1962)
- Phelsuma serraticauda (Mertens, 1963)
- Phelsuma dorsivittata (Mertens, 1964)
- Phelsuma pusilla (Mertens, 1964)
- Phelsuma modesta (Mertens, 1970)
- Phelsuma parva (Meier, 1983)
- Phelsuma seippi (Meier, 1987)
- Phelsuma klemmeri (Seipp, 1991)
- Phelsuma antanosy (Raxworthy & Nussbaum, 1993)
- Phelsuma masohoala (Raxworthy & Nussbaum, 1994)
- Phelsuma pronki (Seipp, 1994)
- Phelsuma berghofi (Krügler, 1996)
- Phelsuma malamakibo (Nussbaum, Raxworthy, Raselimanana & Ramanamanjato, 2000)
- Phelsuma hielscheri (Rösler, 2001)
- Phelsuma kely (Schönecker, Bach & Glaw, 2004)
- Phelsuma vanheygeni (Lerner, 2004)
- Phelsuma ravenala (Raxworthy, Ingram, Rabibisoa & Pearson, 2007)
- Phelsuma borai (Glaw, Köhler & Vences, 2009)
- Phelsuma hoeschi (Berghof & Trautmann, 2009)
- Phelsuma roesleri (Glaw, Gehring, Köhler, Franzen & Vences, 2010)
- Phelsuma gouldi (Crottini, Gehring, Glaw, Harris, Lima & Vences, 2011)
- Uroplatus fimbriatus (Schneider, 1797)
- Uroplatus lineatus (Duméril & Bibron, 1836)
- Uroplatus ebenaui (Boettger, 1879)
- Uroplatus phantasticus (Boulenger, 1888)
- Uroplatus alluaudi (Mocquard, 1894)
- Uroplatus garamaso (Glaw, Köhler, Ratsoavina, Raselimanana, Crottini, Gehring, Böhme, Scherz & Vences, 2023)
- Uroplatus guentheri (Mocquard, 1908)
- Uroplatus sikorae (Boettger, 1913)
- Uroplatus henkeli (Böhme & Ibisch, 1990)
- Uroplatus sameiti (Böhme & Ibisch, 1990)
- Uroplatus malahelo (Raxworthy & Nussbaum, 1994)
- Uroplatus malama (Raxworthy & Nussbaum, 1995)
- Uroplatus pietschmanni (Böhle & Schönecker, 2004)
- Uroplatus giganteus (Glaw, Kosuch, Henkel, Sound & Böhme, 2006)
- Uroplatus finiavana (Ratsoavina, Louis jr., Crottini, Randrianiaina, Glaw & Vences, 2011)

=== Gerrhosauridae ===
- Tracheloptychus madagascariensis (Peters, 1854)
- Tracheloptychus petersi (Grandidier, 1869)
- Zonosaurus madagascariensis (Gray, 1831)
- Zonosaurus ornatus (Gray, 1831)
- Zonosaurus quadrilineatus (Grandidier, 1867)
- Zonosaurus karsteni (Grandidier, 1869)
- Zonosaurus laticaudatus (Grandidier, 1869)
- Zonosaurus aeneus (Grandidier, 1872)
- Zonosaurus rufipes (Boettger, 1881)
- Zonosaurus subunicolor (Boettger, 1881)
- Zonosaurus boettgeri (Steindachner, 1891)
- Zonosaurus maximus (Boulenger, 1896)
- Zonosaurus trilineatus (Angel, 1939)
- Zonosaurus haraldmeieri (Brygoo & Böhme, 1985)
- Zonosaurus brygooi (Lang & Böhme, 1990)
- Zonosaurus anelanelany (Nussbaum, Raxworthy & Raselimanana, 2000)
- Zonosaurus bemaraha (Nussbaum, Raxworthy & Raselimanana, 2000)
- Zonosaurus tsingy (Nussbaum, Raxworthy & Raselimanana, 2000)
- Zonosaurus maramaintso (Nussbaum, Raxworthy & Raselimanana, 2006)

=== Madagascan iguanas (Opluridae) ===
- Chalarodon madagascariensis (Peters, 1854)
- Oplurus cyclurus (Merren, 1820)
- Oplurus cuvieri (Gray, 1831)
- Oplurus quadrimaculatus (Duméril & Bibron, 1851)
- Oplurus fierinensis (Grandidier, 1869)
- Oplurus saxicola (Grandidier, 1869)
- Oplurus grandidieri (Mocquard, 1900)

=== Skinks (Scincidae) ===
- Amphiglossus astrolabi (Duméril & Bibron, 1839)
- Amphiglossus splendidus (Grandidier, 1872)
- Amphiglossus melanurus (Günther, 1877)
- Amphiglossus gastrostictus (O'Shaughnessy, 1879)
- Amphiglossus macrocercus (Günther, 1882)
- Amphiglossus frontoparietalis (Boulenger, 1889)
- Amphiglossus ornaticeps (Boulenger, 1896)
- Amphiglossus ardouini (Mocquard, 1897)
- Amphiglossus crenni (Mocquard, 1906)
- Amphiglossus reticulatus (Kaudern, 1922)
- Amphiglossus decaryi (Angel, 1930)
- Amphiglossus andranovahensis (Angel, 1933)
- Amphiglossus elongatus (Angel, 1933)
- Amphiglossus alluaudi (Brygoo, 1981)
- Amphiglossus tsaratananensis (Brygoo, 1981)
- Amphiglossus anosyensis (Raxworthy & Nussbaum, 1993)
- Amphiglossus mandokava (Raxworthy & Nussbaum, 1993)
- Amphiglossus punctatus (Raxworthy & Nussbaum, 1993)
- Amphiglossus mandady (Andreone & Greer, 2002)
- Amphiglossus spilostichus (Andreone & Greer, 2002)
- Amphiglossus stylus (Andreone & Greer, 2002)
- Amphiglossus tanysoma (Andreone & Greer, 2002)
- Amphiglossus meva (Miralles, Raselimanana, Rakotomalala, Vences & Vieines, 2011)
- Androngo trivittatus (Boulenger, 1896)
- Cryptoblepharus cognatus (Boettger, 1881)
- Cryptoblepharus voeltzkowi (Sternfeld, 1918)
- Madascincus igneocaudatus (Grandidier, 1867)
- Madascincus polleni (Grandidier, 1869)
- Madascincus mouroundavae (Grandidier, 1872)
- Madascincus melanopleura (Günther, 1877)
- Madascincus stumpffi (Boettger, 1882)
- Madascincus macrolepis (Boulenger, 1888)
- Madascincus ankodabensis (Angel, 1930)
- Madascincus minutus (Raxworthy & Nussbaum, 1993)
- Madascincus nanus (Andreone & Greer, 2002)
- Madascincus arenicola (Miralles, Köhler, Glaw & Vences, 2011)
- Paracontias holomelas (Günther, 1877)
- Paracontias hildebrandti (Peters, 1880)
- Paracontias brocchii (Mocquard, 1894)
- Paracontias rothschildi (Mocquard, 1905)
- Paracontias minimus (Mocquard, 1906)
- Paracontias milloti (Angel, 1949)
- Paracontias hafa (Andreone & Greer, 2002)
- Paracontias manify (Andreone & Greer, 2002)
- Paracontias tsararano (Andreone & Greer, 2002)
- Paracontias kankana (Köhler, Vieites, Glaw, Kaffenberger & Vences, 2009)
- Paracontias fasika (Köhler, Vences, Erbacher &Glaw, 2010)
- Paracontias vermisaurus (Miralles, Köhler, Vieites, Glaw & Vences, 2011)
- Pseudoacontias madagascariensis (Bocage, 1889)
- Pseudoacontias angelorum (Raxworthy & Nussbaum, 1995)
- Pseudoacontias menamainty (Andreone & Greer, 2002)
- Pseudoacontias unicolor (Sakata & Hikida, 2003)
- Pygomeles braconnieri (Grandidier, 1867)
- Pygomeles petteri (Pasteur & Blanc, 1962)
- Sirenoscincus yamagishii (Sakata & Hikida, 2003)
- Sirenoscincus mobydick (Miralles, Anjeriniaina, Hipsley, Müller, Glaw & Vences, 2012)
- Trachylepis gravenhorstii (Duméril & Bibron, 1839)
- Trachylepis comorensis (Peters, 1854)
- Trachylepis elegans (Peters, 1854)
- Trachylepis aureopunctata (Grandidier, 1867)
- Trachylepis boettgeri (Boulenger, 1887)
- Trachylepis betsileana (Mocquard, 1906)
- Trachylepis madagascariensis (Mocquard, 1908)
- Trachylepis vato (Raxworthy & Nussbaum, 1994)
- Trachylepis dumasi (Raxworthy & Nussbaum, 1995)
- Trachylepis lavarambo (Raxworthy & Nussbaum, 1998)
- Trachylepis nancycoutuae (Raxworthy & Nussbaum, 1998)
- Trachylepis tandrefana (Nussbaum, Raxworthy & Ramanamanjato, 1999)
- Trachylepis tavaratra (Nussbaum, Raxworthy & Ramanamanjato, 1999)
- Trachylepis vezo (Nussbaum, Raxworthy & Ramanamanjato, 1999)
- Trachylepis volamenaloha (Nussbaum, Raxworthy & Ramanamanjato, 1999)
- Voeltzkowia fierinensis (Grandidier, 1869)
- Voeltzkowia rubrocaudata (Grandidier, 1869)
- Voeltzkowia mira (Boettger, 1893)
- Voeltzkowia lineata (Mocquard, 1901)
- Voeltzkowia petiti (Angel, 1924)

== Crocodilia ==
=== Crocodylidae ===
- Crocodylus niloticus (Laurenti, 1768)

== Turtles ==
=== Cheloniidae ===
- Caretta caretta (Linnaeus, 1758)
- Chelonia mydas (Linnaeus, 1758)
- Eretmochelys imbricata (Linnaeus, 1766)
- Lepidochelys olivacea (Eschscholtz, 1829)

=== Dermochelyidae ===
- Dermochelys coriacea (Vandelli, 1761)

=== Pelomedusidae ===
- Pelomedusa subrufa (Bonnaterre, 1789)
- Pelusios subniger (Lacépède, 1789)
- Pelusios castanoides (Hewitt, 1931)

=== Podocnemididae ===
- Erymnochelys madagascariensis (Grandidier, 1867)

=== Tortoises (Testudinidae) ===
- Aldabrachelys abrupta (Grandidier, 1868)
- Aldabrachelys grandidieri (Vaillant, 1885)
- Astrochelys radiata (Shaw, 1802)
- Astrochelys yniphora (Vaillant, 1885)
- Kinixys zombensis (Hewitt, 1931)
- Pyxis arachnoides (Bell, 1827)
- Pyxis planicauda (Grandidier, 1867)
