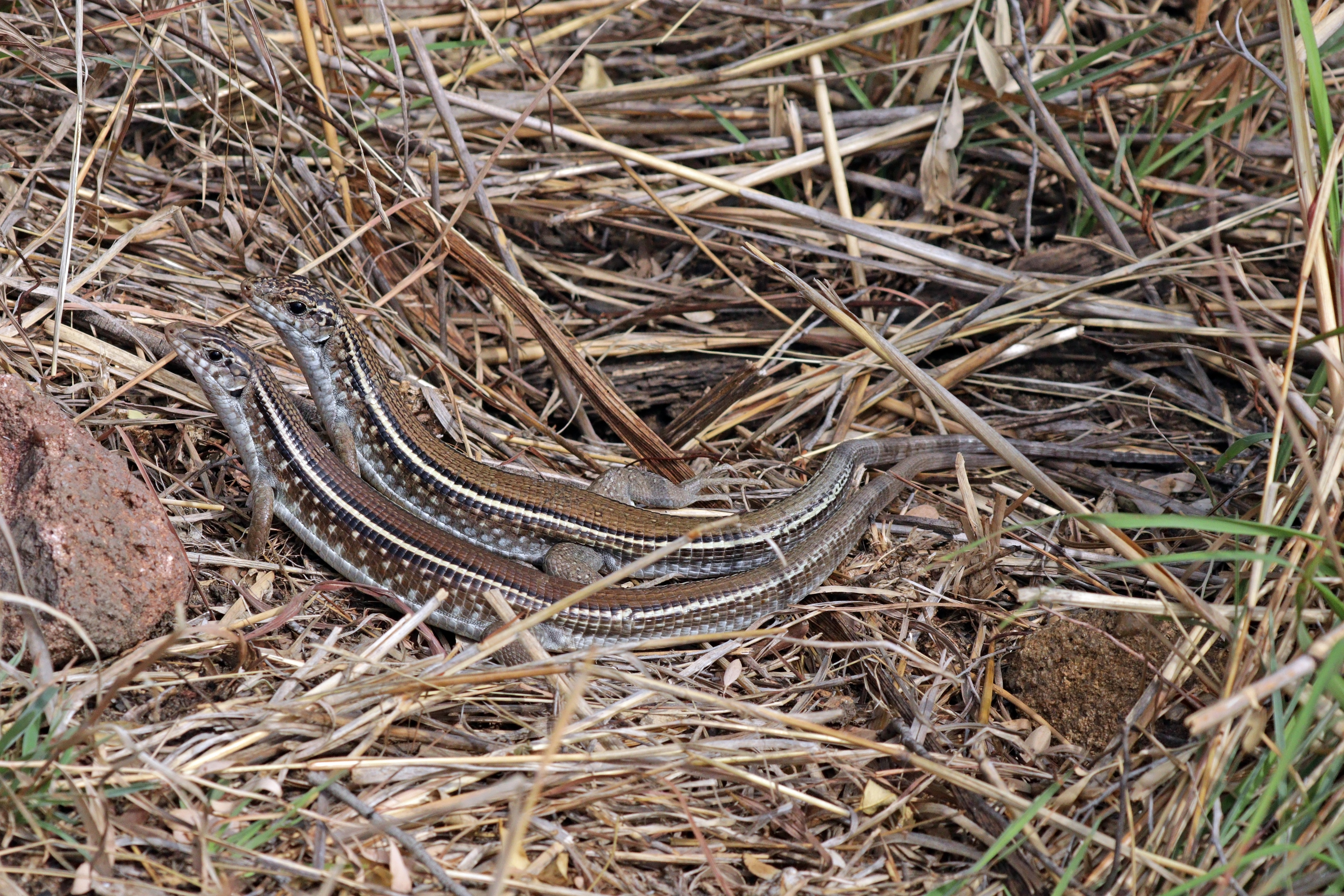
- Ornate plated lizards (Z. ornatus), female and male Isalo National Park
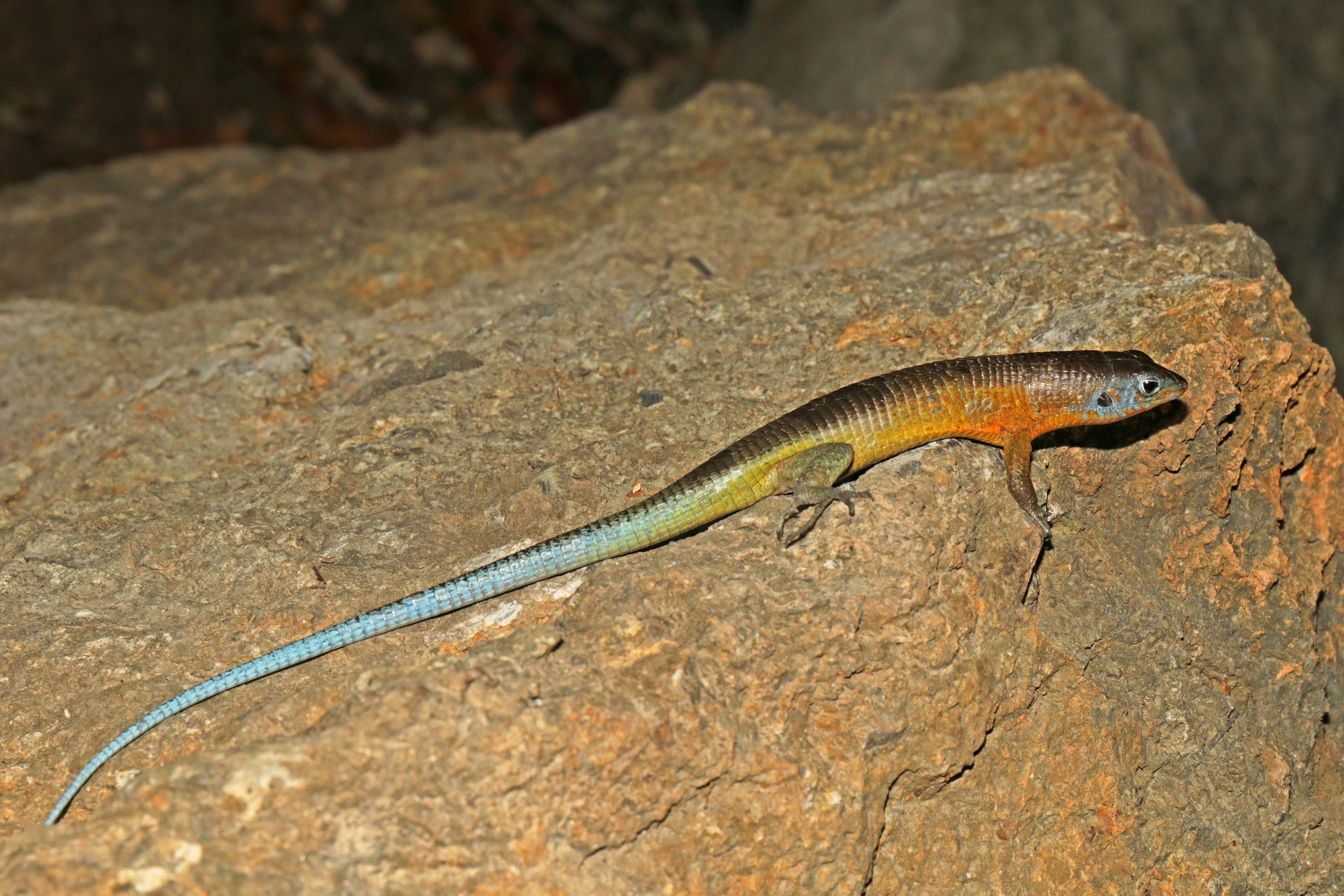
- Tsingy plated lizard (Z. tsingy), Ankarana

Scientific classification
- Kingdom: Animalia
- Phylum: Chordata
- Class: Reptilia
- Order: Squamata
- Family: Gerrhosauridae
- Subfamily: Zonosaurinae
- Genus: Zonosaurus; Boulenger, 1887

= Zonosaurus =

Genus of lizards

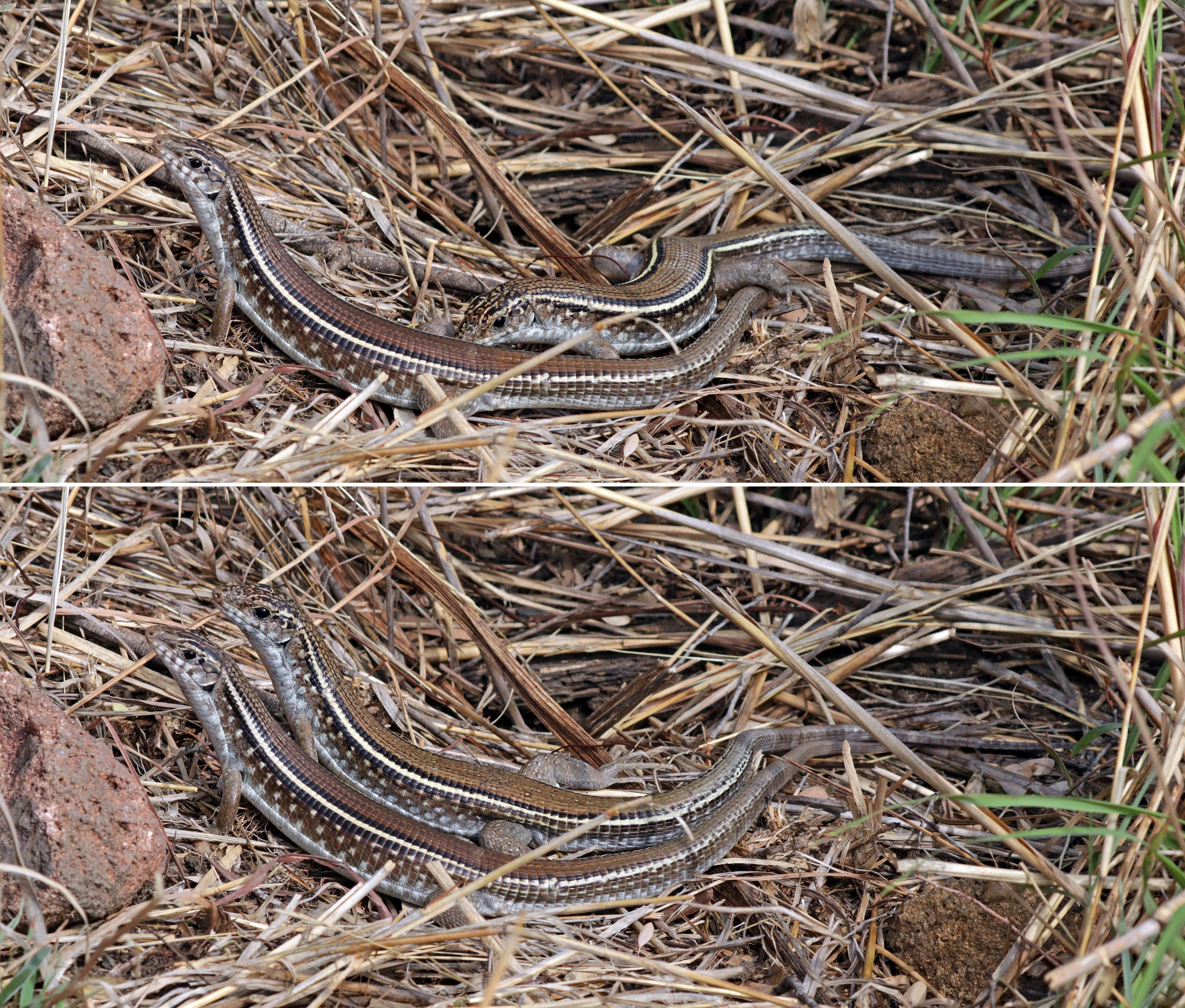
Z. ornatus mating ritual

Zonosaurus is a genus of lizards in the family Gerrhosauridae.

== Geographic range ==
Species in the genus Zonosaurus are found in Madagascar and Seychelles.

== Species ==
The following 17 species are considered to be valid.

- Zonosaurus aeneus (Grandidier, 1872) – bronze girdled lizard
- Zonosaurus anelanelany Raselimanana, Raxworthy & Nussbaum, 2000
- Zonosaurus bemaraha Raselimanana, Raxworthy & Nussbaum, 2000
- Zonosaurus boettgeri Steindachner, 1891 – Boettger's girdled lizard
- Zonosaurus brygooi Lang & Böhme, 1990 – Brygoo's girdled lizard
- Zonosaurus haraldmeieri Brygoo & Böhme, 1985 – green zonosaur
- Zonosaurus karsteni (Grandidier, 1869) – Karsten's girdled lizard
- Zonosaurus laticaudatus (Grandidier, 1869) – western girdled lizard
- Zonosaurus madagascariensis (Gray, 1831) – Madagascar girdled lizard
- Zonosaurus maramaintso Raselimanana, Raxworthy & Nussbaum, 2006
- Zonosaurus maximus Boulenger, 1896 – southeastern girdled lizard
- Zonosaurus ornatus (Gray, 1831) – ornate girdled lizard
- Zonosaurus quadrilineatus (Grandidier, 1867) – four-lined girdled lizard
- Zonosaurus rufipes (Boettger, 1881) – red-legged girdled lizard
- Zonosaurus subunicolor (Boettger, 1881)
- Zonosaurus trilineatus Angel, 1939 – three-lined girdled lizard
- Zonosaurus tsingy Raselimanana, Raxworthy & Nussbaum, 2000 – tsingy plated lizard

Nota bene: A binomial authority in parentheses indicates that the species was originally described in a genus other than Zonosaurus.
