= Zonosaurus boettgeri =

Conservation status
- Vulnerable (IUCN 3.1)

Scientific classification
- Kingdom: Animalia
- Phylum: Chordata
- Class: Reptilia
- Order: Squamata
- Family: Gerrhosauridae
- Genus: Zonosaurus
- Species: Z. boettgeri

Binomial name
- Zonosaurus boettgeri Steindachner, 1891

Species of reptile

Zonosaurus boettgeri, Boettger's girdled lizard, is a species of lizard in the family Gerrhosauridae. The species is endemic Madagascar.

== Geographic range ==
Z. boettgeri is found in the northern Madagascar mainland, and on the island Nosy Be, where it is found in Lokobe Reserve.

== Habitat ==
The preferred natural habitat of Z. boettgeri is forest, at altitudes from sea level to 500 m (1,600 ft).

== Description ==
Z. boettgeri grows to a total length (including tail) of 50 cm (20 in).

== Behavior ==
Z. boettgeri is arboreal.

== Reproduction ==
Z. boettgeri is oviparous.

== Etymology ==
The specific name, boettgeri, is in honor of German herpetologist Oskar Boettger.
