= Zonosaurus maramaintso =

Conservation status
- Data Deficient (IUCN 3.1)

Scientific classification
- Kingdom: Animalia
- Phylum: Chordata
- Class: Reptilia
- Order: Squamata
- Family: Gerrhosauridae
- Genus: Zonosaurus
- Species: Z. maramaintso

Binomial name
- Zonosaurus maramaintso Raselimanana, Raxworthy, & Nussbaum, 2006

Species of reptile

Zonosaurus maramaintso is a species of lizard in the family Gerrhosauridae. The species is endemic to Madagascar.
