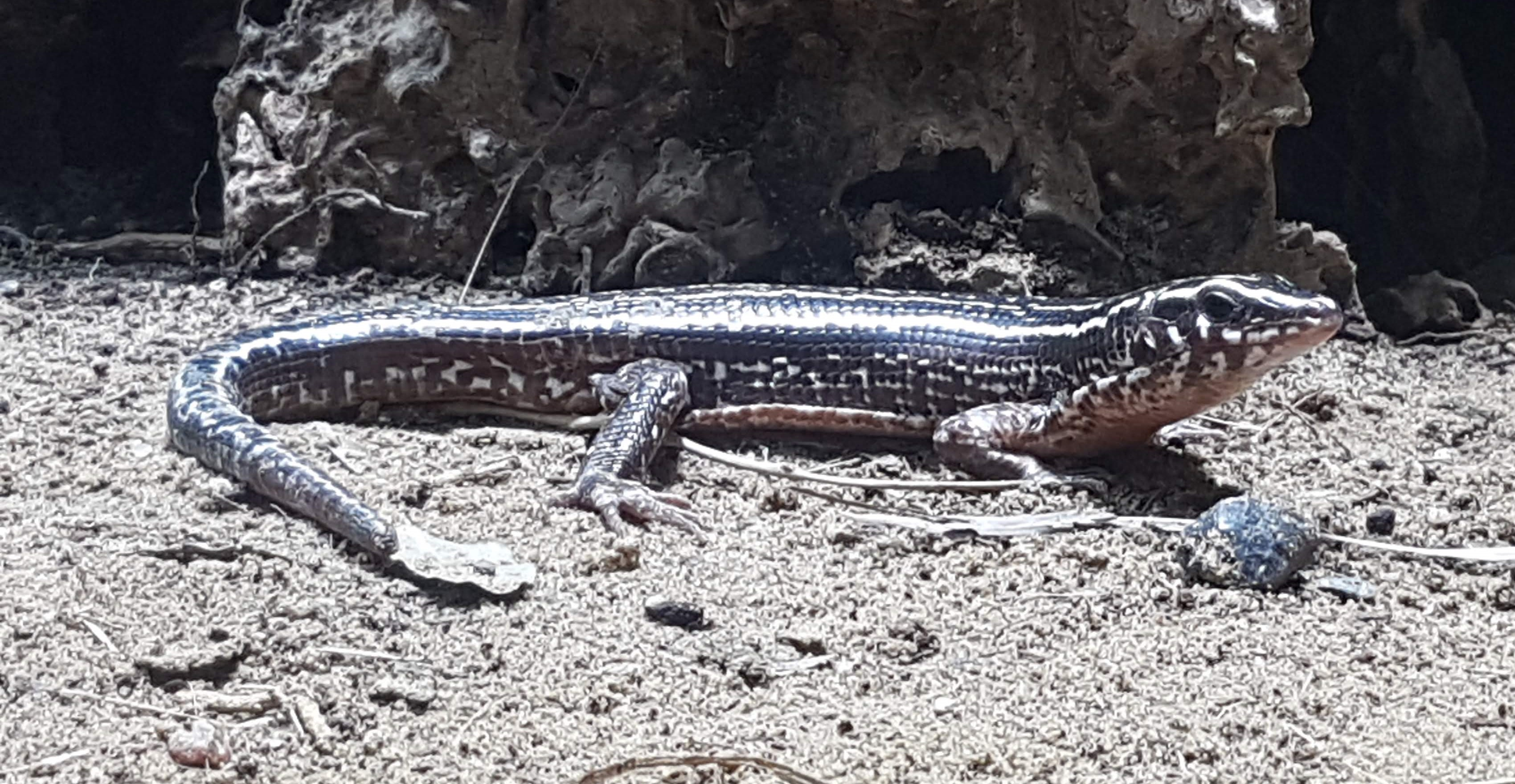

Conservation status
- Vulnerable (IUCN 3.1)

Scientific classification
- Kingdom: Animalia
- Phylum: Chordata
- Class: Reptilia
- Order: Squamata
- Family: Gerrhosauridae
- Genus: Zonosaurus
- Species: Z. quadrilineatus

Binomial name
- Zonosaurus quadrilineatus (Grandidier, 1867)
- The range of Zonosaurus quadrilineatus shown in red

Synonyms
- Gerrhosaurus 4-lineatus (Grandidier, 1867)

= Zonosaurus quadrilineatus =

Four-lined girdled lizard

Species of lizard

Zonosaurus quadrilineatus, the four-lined girdled lizard, is a lizard species native to an area of approximately 3,300 km around Toliara in south-western Madagascar, and is found in dry habitats from sand dunes to forests. It is known to occur at elevations close to sea level. The species is restricted to the region between the Onilahy and Mangoky rivers in south-western Madagascar.
