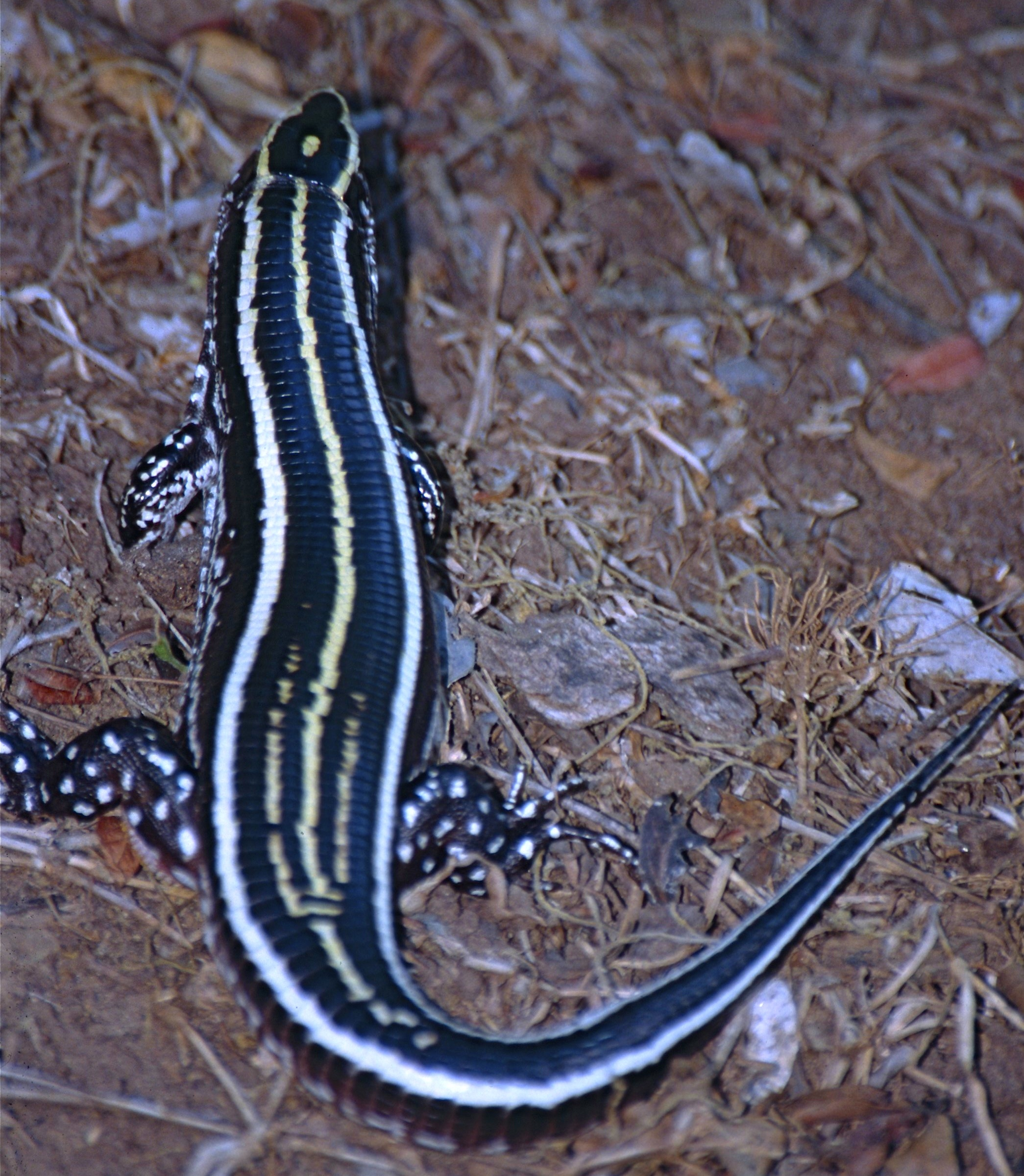

Conservation status
- Least Concern (IUCN 3.1)

Scientific classification
- Kingdom: Animalia
- Phylum: Chordata
- Class: Reptilia
- Order: Squamata
- Family: Gerrhosauridae
- Genus: Zonosaurus
- Species: Z. trilineatus

Binomial name
- Zonosaurus trilineatus Angel, 1939

= Zonosaurus trilineatus =

Species of reptile

Zonosaurus trilineatus, the three-lined girdled lizard, is a species of lizard in the family Gerrhosauridae. The species is endemic to Madagascar.
