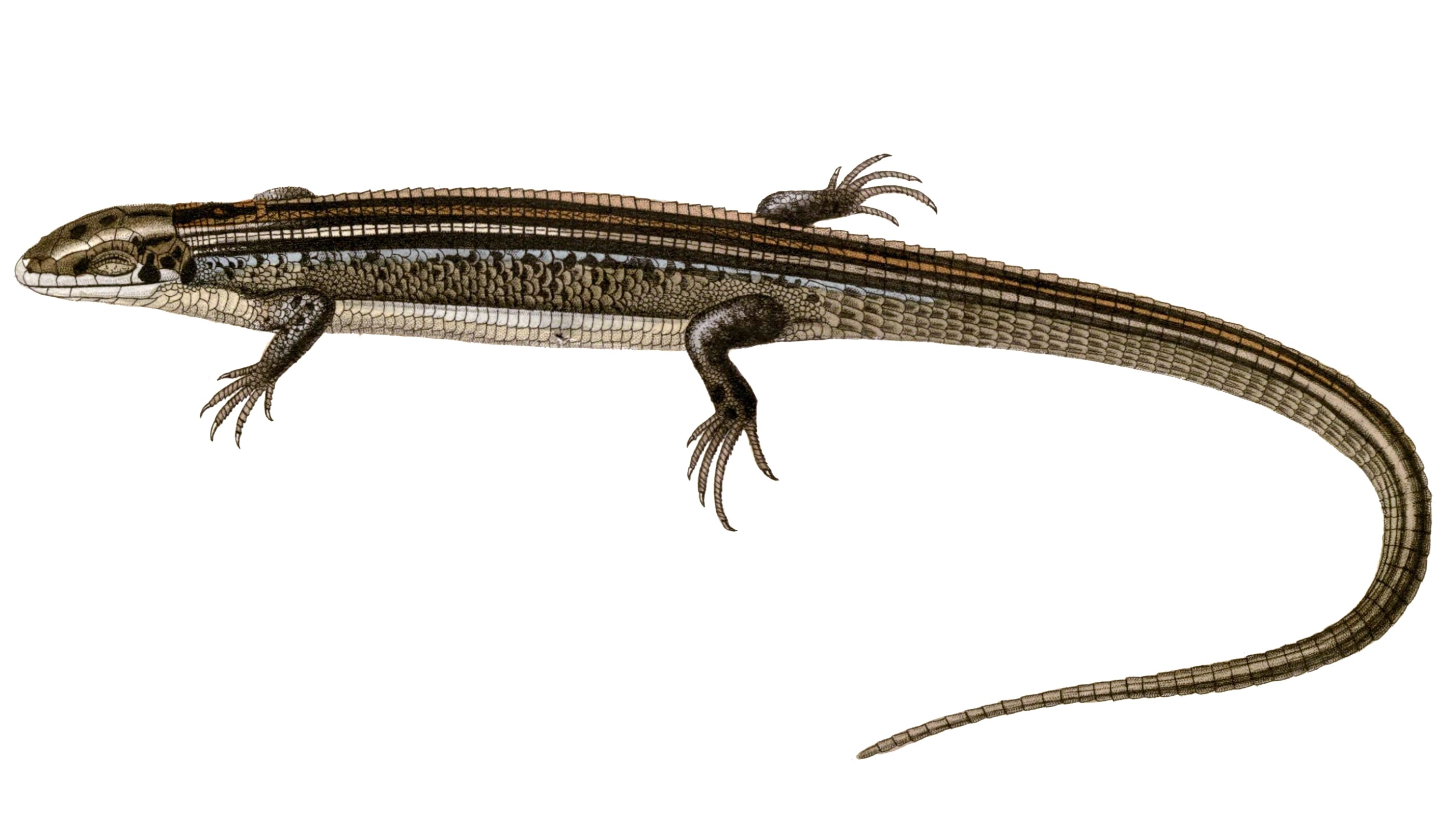

Conservation status
- Least Concern (IUCN 3.1)

Scientific classification
- Kingdom: Animalia
- Phylum: Chordata
- Class: Reptilia
- Order: Squamata
- Family: Gerrhosauridae
- Genus: Zonosaurus
- Species: Z. ornatus

Binomial name
- Zonosaurus ornatus (JE Gray, 1831)

= Zonosaurus ornatus =

Species of lizard

Zonosaurus ornatus, the ornate girdled lizard, is a species of lizard in the family Gerrhosauridae. The species is endemic to Madagascar.
