= Phelsuma malamakibo =

Conservation status
- Near Threatened (IUCN 3.1)

Scientific classification
- Kingdom: Animalia
- Phylum: Chordata
- Class: Reptilia
- Order: Squamata
- Suborder: Gekkota
- Family: Gekkonidae
- Genus: Phelsuma
- Species: P. malamakibo

Binomial name
- Phelsuma malamakibo Nussbaum, Raxworthy, Raselimanana & Ramanamanjato, 2000
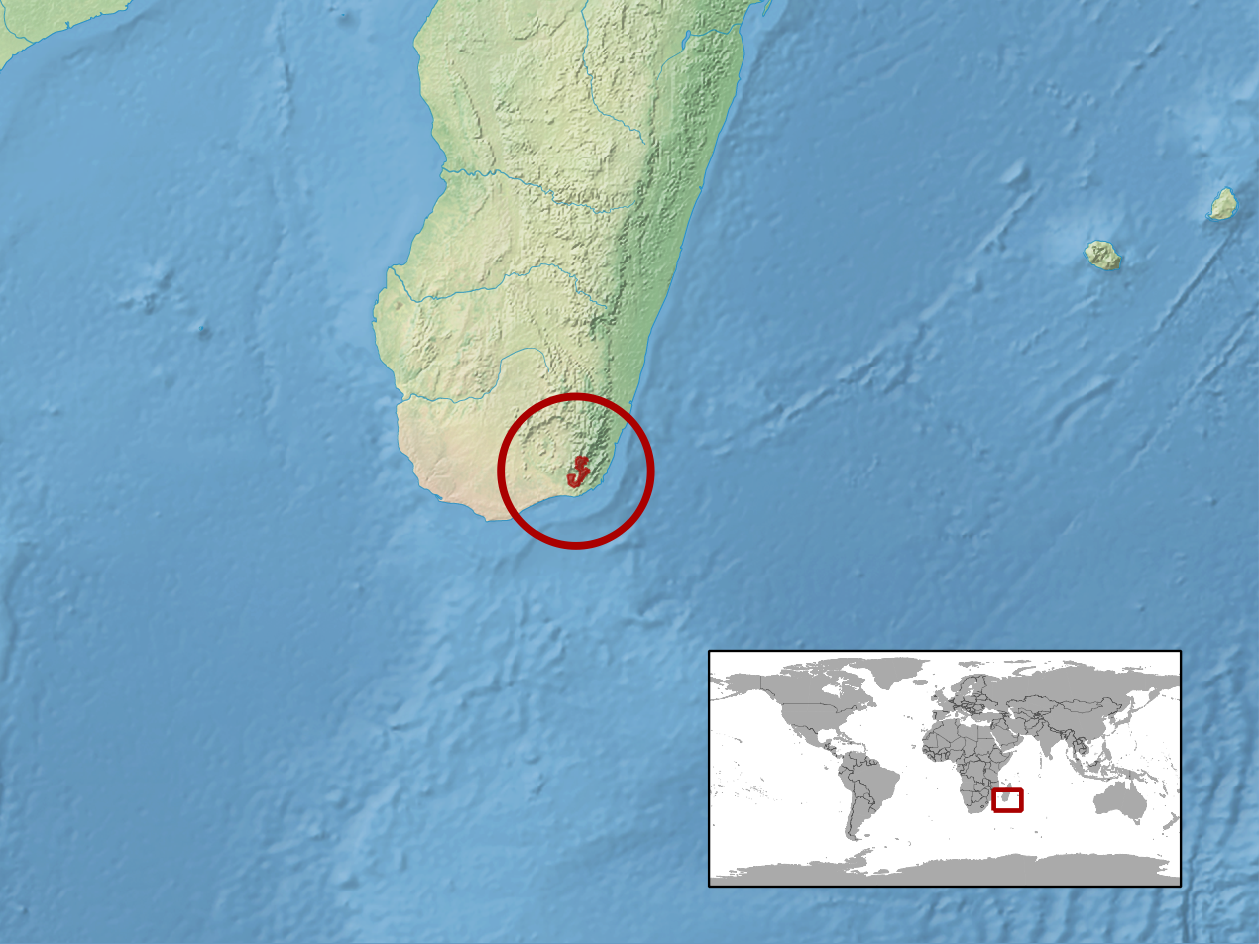

Species of lizard

Phelsuma malamakibo is a species of gecko endemic to the Anosy Region of Madagascar.
