= Zonosaurus haraldmeieri =

Conservation status
- Near Threatened (IUCN 3.1)

Scientific classification
- Kingdom: Animalia
- Phylum: Chordata
- Class: Reptilia
- Order: Squamata
- Family: Gerrhosauridae
- Genus: Zonosaurus
- Species: Z. haraldmeieri

Binomial name
- Zonosaurus haraldmeieri Brygoo & Böhme, 1985

Synonyms
- Zonosaurus madagascariensis haraldmeieri Brygoo & Böhme, 1985

Species of reptile

Zonosaurus haraldmeieri is a species of lizard in the family Gerrhosauridae. The species is endemic to Madagascar.

== Etymology ==
The specific name, haraldmeieri, is in honor of German herpetologist Harald Meier.

== Geographic range ==
Z. haraldmeieri is found near Antsiranana, in Diana Region, in extreme northern Madagascar.

== Habitat ==
The preferred natural habitats of Z. haraldmeieri are forest and savanna, but it has also been found in artificial habitats such as field edges and gardens.

== Reproduction ==
Z. haraldmeieri is oviparous.
