= Grandidierina =

Scientific classification
- Kingdom: Animalia
- Phylum: Chordata
- Class: Reptilia
- Order: Squamata
- Family: Scincidae
- Subfamily: Scincinae
- Genus: Grandidierina; Mocquard, 1894

Species
- Four species, see text.

Genus of lizards

Grandidierina is a genus of skinks, lizards in the family Scincidae. The genus is endemic to Madagascar.

== Species ==
The following four species, listed alphabetically by specific name, are recognized as being valid.

- Grandidierina fierinensis (Grandidier, 1869)
- Grandidierina lineata (Mocquard, 1901)
- Grandidierina petiti (Angel, 1924)
- Grandidierina rubrocaudata (Grandidier, 1869)

Nota bene: A binomial authority in parentheses indicates that the species was originally described in a genus other than Grandidierina.
