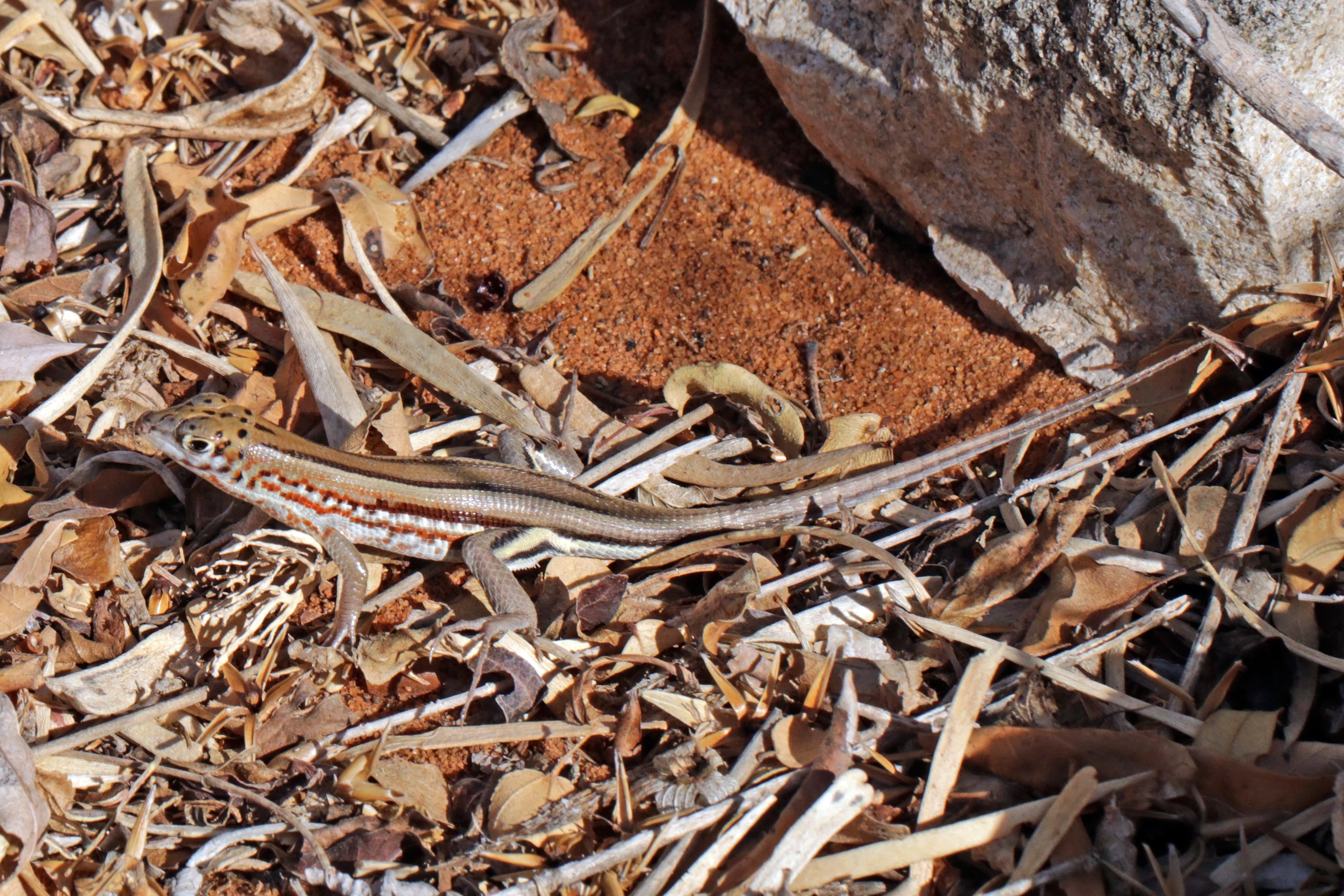
- Peters' keeled plated lizard (Tracheloptychus petersi) at Reserve Reniala

Scientific classification
- Kingdom: Animalia
- Phylum: Chordata
- Class: Reptilia
- Order: Squamata
- Family: Gerrhosauridae
- Subfamily: Zonosaurinae
- Genus: Tracheloptychus; W. Peters, 1854

= Tracheloptychus =

Genus of lizards

Tracheloptychus is a small genus of lizards in the family Gerrhosauridae. The genus is endemic to Madagascar.

== Species ==
There are two species which are recognized as being valid.

- Tracheloptychus madagascariensis W. Peters, 1854 – Malagasy keeled plated lizard, Madagascar girdled lizard
- Tracheloptychus petersi Grandidier, 1869 – Peters' keeled plated lizard
