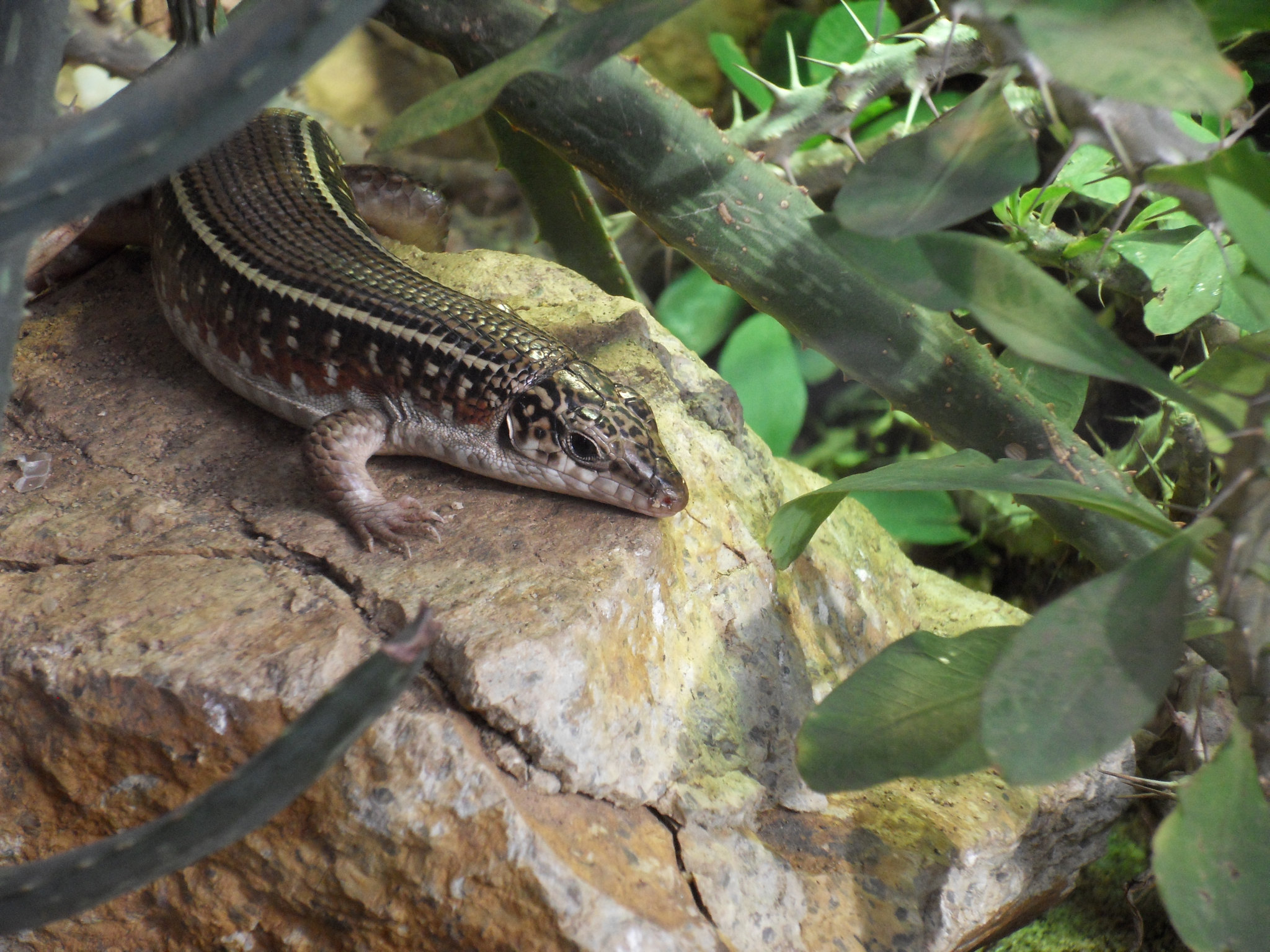

Conservation status
- Least Concern (IUCN 3.1)

Scientific classification
- Kingdom: Animalia
- Phylum: Chordata
- Class: Reptilia
- Order: Squamata
- Family: Gerrhosauridae
- Genus: Zonosaurus
- Species: Z. karsteni

Binomial name
- Zonosaurus karsteni (Grandidier, 1869)

Synonyms
- Gerrhosaurus karsteni Grandidier, 1869

= Zonosaurus karsteni =

Species of reptile

Zonosaurus karsteni, also known commonly as Karsten's girdled lizard, is a species of lizard in the family Gerrhosauridae. The species is endemic to Madagascar.

== Habitat ==
The preferred natural habitats of Z. karsteni are forest, shrubland, and grassland.

== Behavior ==
Z. karsteni is terrestrial.

== Reproduction ==
Z. karsteni is oviparous.
