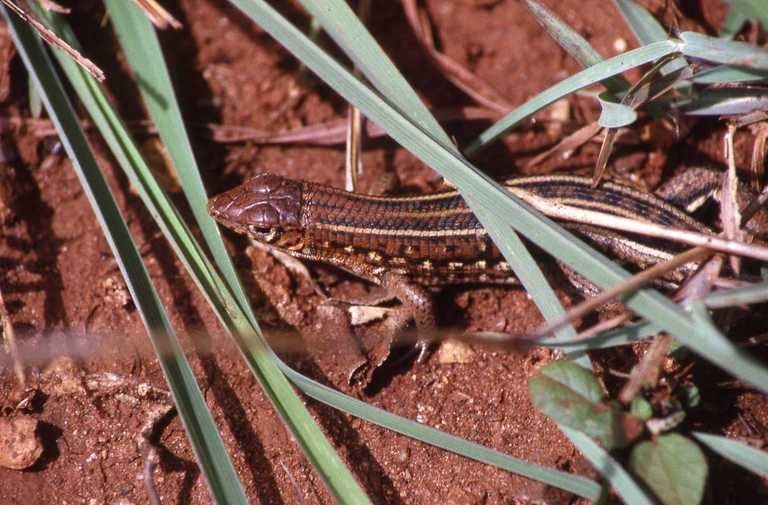

Conservation status
- Least Concern (IUCN 3.1)

Scientific classification
- Kingdom: Animalia
- Phylum: Chordata
- Class: Reptilia
- Order: Squamata
- Family: Gerrhosauridae
- Genus: Tracheloptychus
- Species: T. madagascariensis

Binomial name
- Tracheloptychus madagascariensis Peters, 1854

= Tracheloptychus madagascariensis =

Species of lizard

Tracheloptychus madagascariensis, commonly known as the Madagascar keeled cordylid, is a species of lizard in the family Gerrhosauridae. The species is found in Madagascar.
