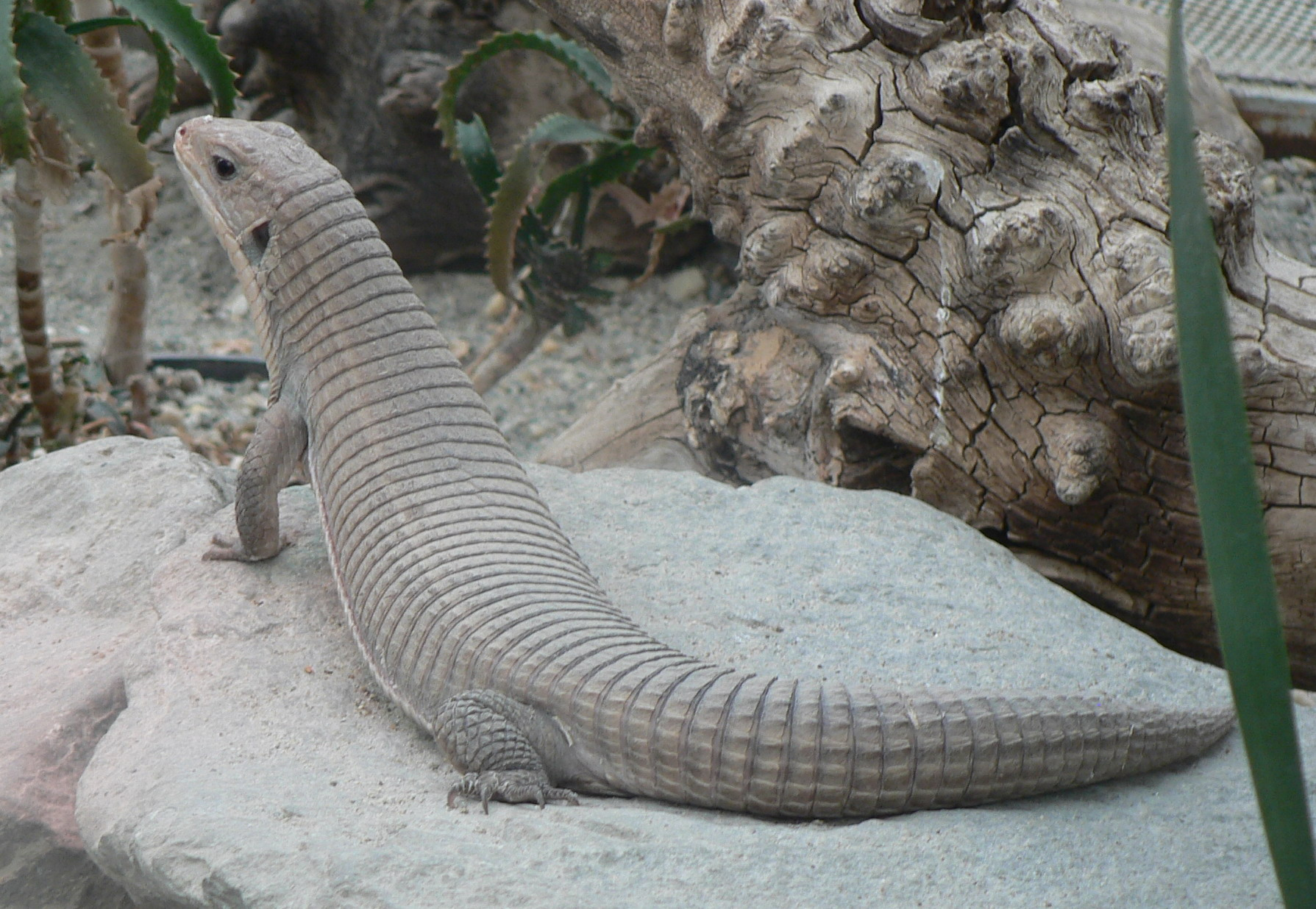

Conservation status
- Least Concern (IUCN 3.1)

Scientific classification
- Kingdom: Animalia
- Phylum: Chordata
- Class: Reptilia
- Order: Squamata
- Family: Gerrhosauridae
- Genus: Broadleysaurus; Bates & Tolley, 2013
- Species: B. major

Binomial name
- Broadleysaurus major (Duméril, 1851)

= Sudan plated lizard =

Species of lizard

The Sudan plated lizard (Broadleysaurus major), also known as the western plated lizard, great plated lizard, or Broadley's rough-scaled plated lizard, is a medium-sized, diurnal African lizard.

== Description ==
The Sudan plated lizard is a medium-sized lizard that can grow up to 20–24 inches (51–61 cm) long, with the tail being less than half of total length. They have stout bodies, short limbs, and moderately broad tails.

This species is easily recognised by its heavily armored appearance. The body and tail is covered in transverse bands of more or less square plate-like keeled scales, and head shields are fused to the skull. The armour makes the animals look a bit like the uncommon perception of Mesozoic reptiles.

Coloration varies from tawny to grayish brown to dark brown with cream-colored spots or striping, with a pale underside. Males tend to be larger than females, and can develop bright-colored throats during breeding season.

== Distribution ==
The Sudan plated lizard can be found in parts of eastern and central Africa, including the countries Tanzania (including the island archipelago of Zanzibar), Kenya and Mozambique. They prefer rocky, semi-open areas within coastal woodland, thicket, moist savannah, and dry savannah habitats. They seem to especially prefer rock piles and crevices.

== Diet ==
Sudan plated lizards are omnivores. Although they primarily eat insects, they also occasionally eat fruits, vegetation, and small vertebrates like small lizards and rodents. They also like fruits and vegetables in their diet.

== Classification ==
Subspecies Broadleysaurus major

- Broadleysaurus major major
- Broadleysaurus major bottegoi
