= Zonosaurus subunicolor =

Conservation status
- Endangered (IUCN 3.1)

Scientific classification
- Kingdom: Animalia
- Phylum: Chordata
- Class: Reptilia
- Order: Squamata
- Family: Gerrhosauridae
- Genus: Zonosaurus
- Species: Z. subunicolor

Binomial name
- Zonosaurus subunicolor (Boettger, 1881)

Species of reptile

Zonosaurus subunicolor is a species of lizard in the family Gerrhosauridae. The species is endemic to Madagascar.
