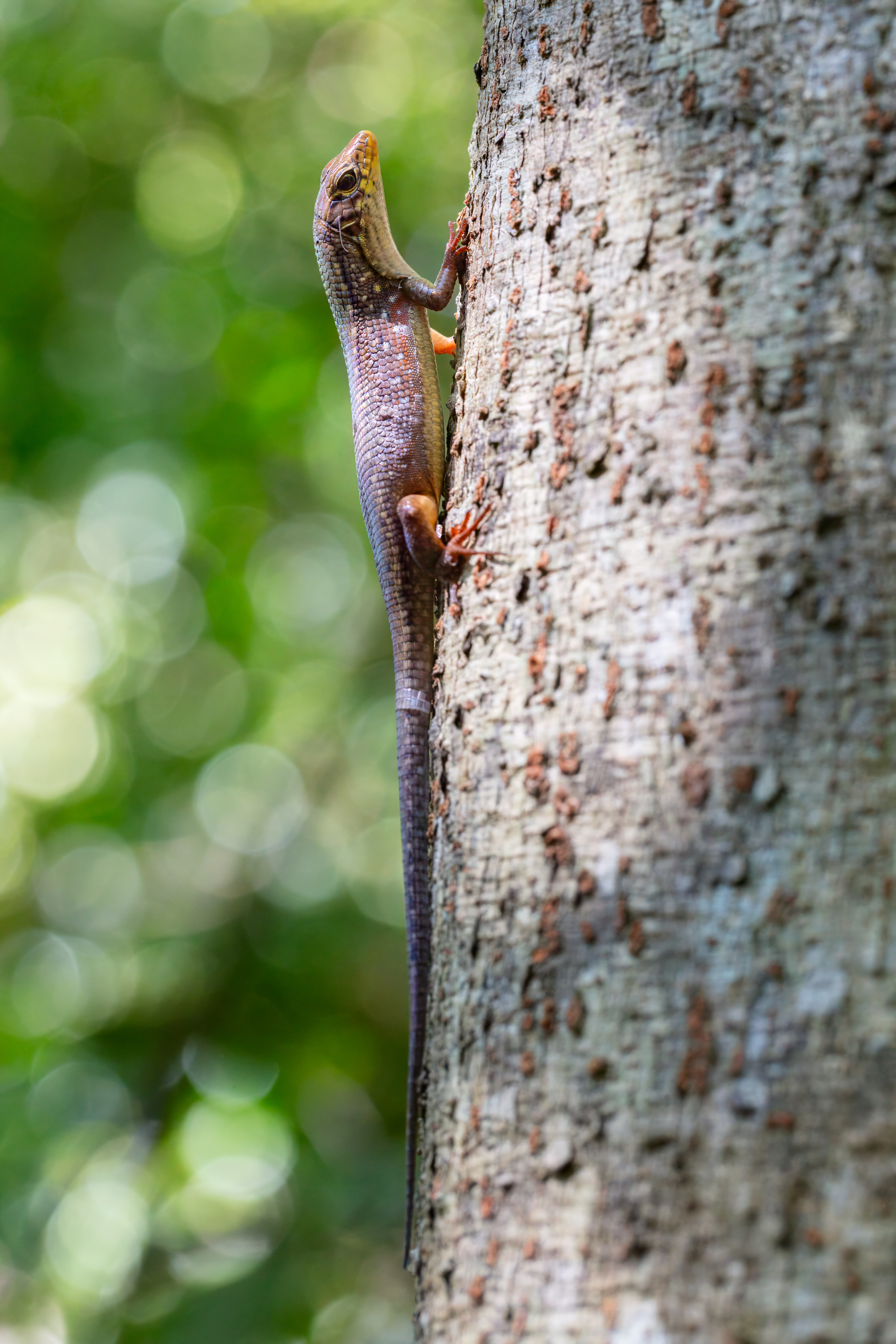

Conservation status
- Near Threatened (IUCN 3.1)

Scientific classification
- Kingdom: Animalia
- Phylum: Chordata
- Class: Reptilia
- Order: Squamata
- Family: Gerrhosauridae
- Genus: Zonosaurus
- Species: Z. rufipes

Binomial name
- Zonosaurus rufipes (Boettger, 1881)

= Zonosaurus rufipes =

Species of reptile

Zonosaurus rufipes, the red-legged girdled lizard, is a species of lizard in the family Gerrhosauridae. The species is endemic to Madagascar.
