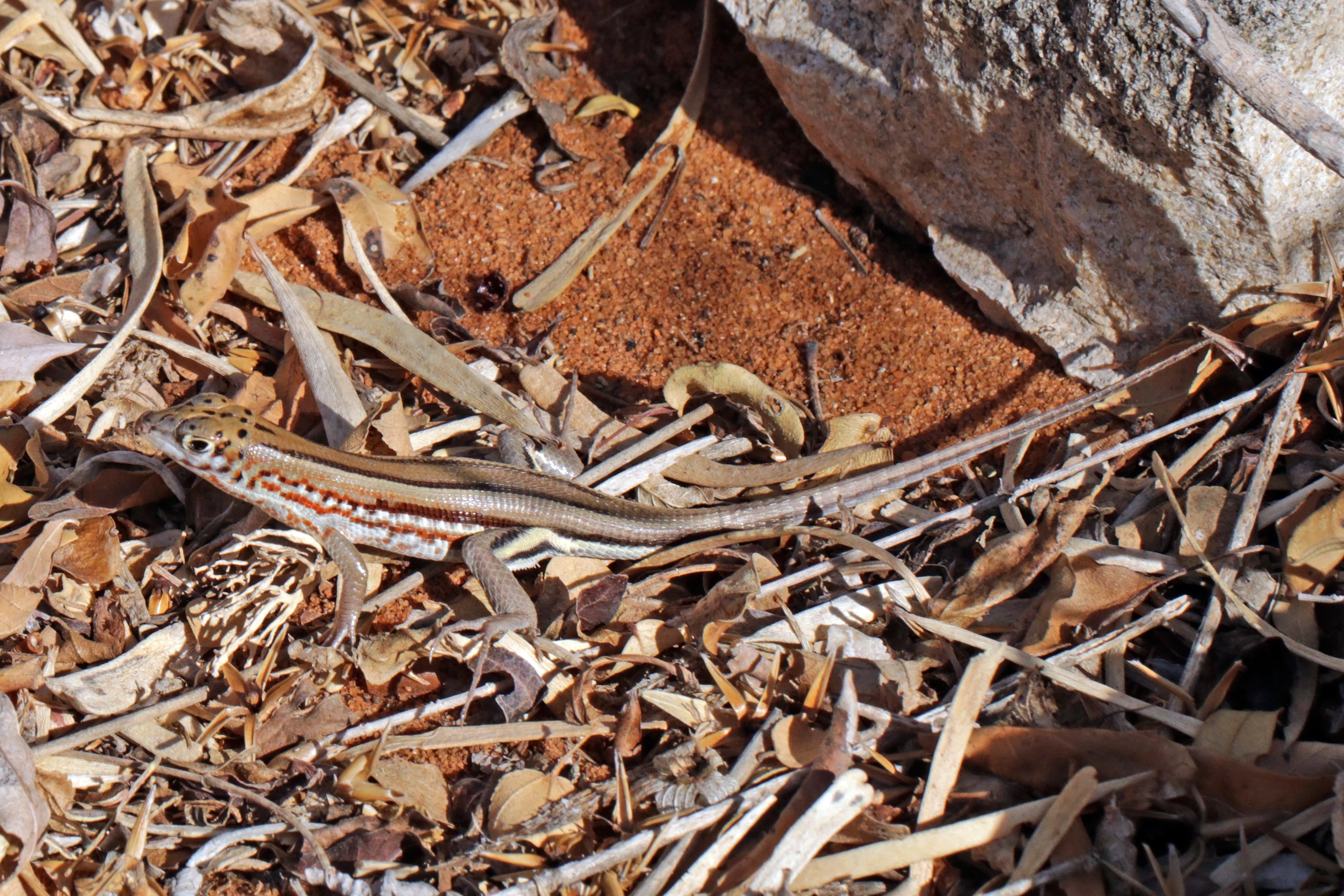

Conservation status
- Vulnerable (IUCN 3.1)

Scientific classification
- Kingdom: Animalia
- Phylum: Chordata
- Class: Reptilia
- Order: Squamata
- Family: Gerrhosauridae
- Genus: Tracheloptychus
- Species: T. petersi

Binomial name
- Tracheloptychus petersi Grandidier, 1869

= Tracheloptychus petersi =

Species of lizard

Tracheloptychus petersi, commonly known as Peters' keeled cordylid and Peters' keeled plated lizard, is a species of lizard in the subfamily Zonosaurinae of the family Gerrhosauridae. The species is endemic to Madagascar.

== Etymology ==
The specific name, petersi, is in honor of German herpetologist Wilhelm Peters.

== Description ==
Tracheloptychus petersi may attain a total length (tail included) of 20 cm (7.9 in). The dorsal scales are finely striated. Boulenger described its coloration as follows: "A light brown band on the middle of the back, between two dark brown streaks. A greyish streak and an irregular reddish band with a few small white spots on each side. Flanks greyish, barred with white and red. Hind limbs grey; inner face of thigh whitish, with a longitudinal black shaft. Belly white. Head with scattered black spots".

== Geographic distribution ==
Tracheloptychus petersi is found in southwestern Madagascar.

== Habitat ==
The preferred natural habitat of Tracheloptychus petersi is forest, at elevations of 15–225 m (49–738 ft).

== Behavior ==
Tracheloptychus petersi is diurnal and terrestrial.

== Reproduction ==
Tracheloptychus petersi is oviparous.
