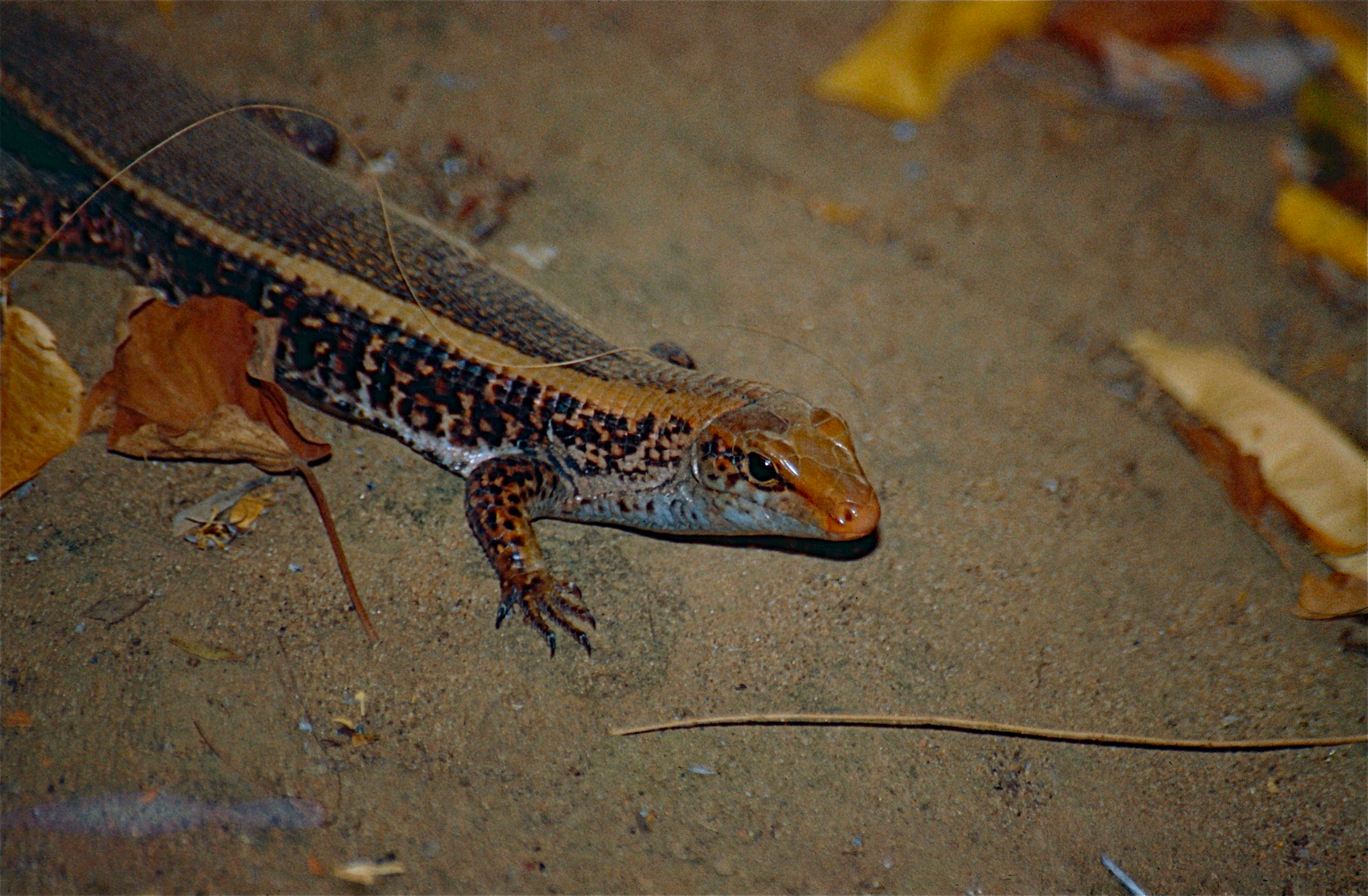

Conservation status
- Least Concern (IUCN 3.1)

Scientific classification
- Kingdom: Animalia
- Phylum: Chordata
- Class: Reptilia
- Order: Squamata
- Family: Gerrhosauridae
- Genus: Zonosaurus
- Species: Z. laticaudatus

Binomial name
- Zonosaurus laticaudatus (Grandidier, 1869)

= Zonosaurus laticaudatus =

Species of reptile

Zonosaurus laticaudatus, the western girdled lizard, is a species of lizard in the family Gerrhosauridae. The species is endemic to Madagascar. It is characterised by a lateral fold of skin which runs along the back of its neck and two very distinctive dorsolateral stripes which emerge from this fold and run the length of its body.

The western girdled lizard is thought to have once been broadly distributed across all of Madascar. They are now located in three separate zones, likely as a result of ecological change and local extirpation. Although there are other theories as to why they are no longer so widely spread.

They are highly adaptable regarding their use of microhabitats, with rupicolous, terrestrial and arboreal behaviour having been observed. Additionally, they appear not to be limited by abiotic factors such as temperature and humidity. Their diet as generalist, opportunistic feeders, consists of invertebrates and fruit and they are important seed-dispersers of the fruit they consume. They are often found sun-bathing in open areas and they display a behaviour known as heliotherm shuttling. This is simply the action of moving in and out of the shade to thermoregulate.

Like the other lizards in their genus, Zonosaurus laticaudatus can swim and dive. They have been observed to use these abilities to escape prey, diving to the bottom of shallow pools and burying themselves under decaying leaf matter, where they can remain for minutes before needing to go up for air.
