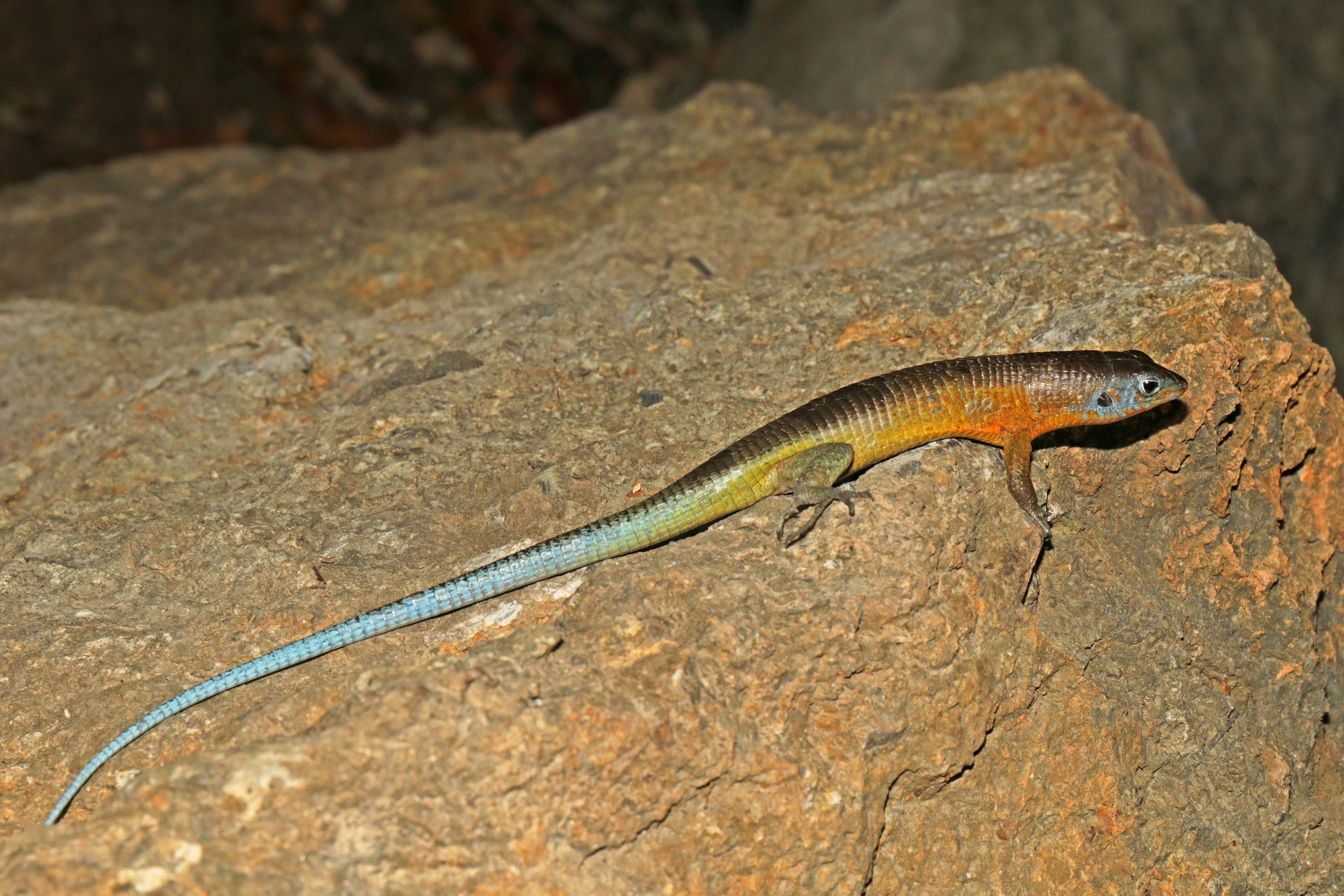

Conservation status
- Least Concern (IUCN 3.1)

Scientific classification
- Kingdom: Animalia
- Phylum: Chordata
- Class: Reptilia
- Order: Squamata
- Family: Gerrhosauridae
- Genus: Zonosaurus
- Species: Z. tsingy

Binomial name
- Zonosaurus tsingy Raselimanana, Raxworthy, & Nussbaum, 2000

= Zonosaurus tsingy =

Species of reptile

Zonosaurus tsingy is a species of lizard in the family Gerrhosauridae. The species is endemic to Madagascar.
