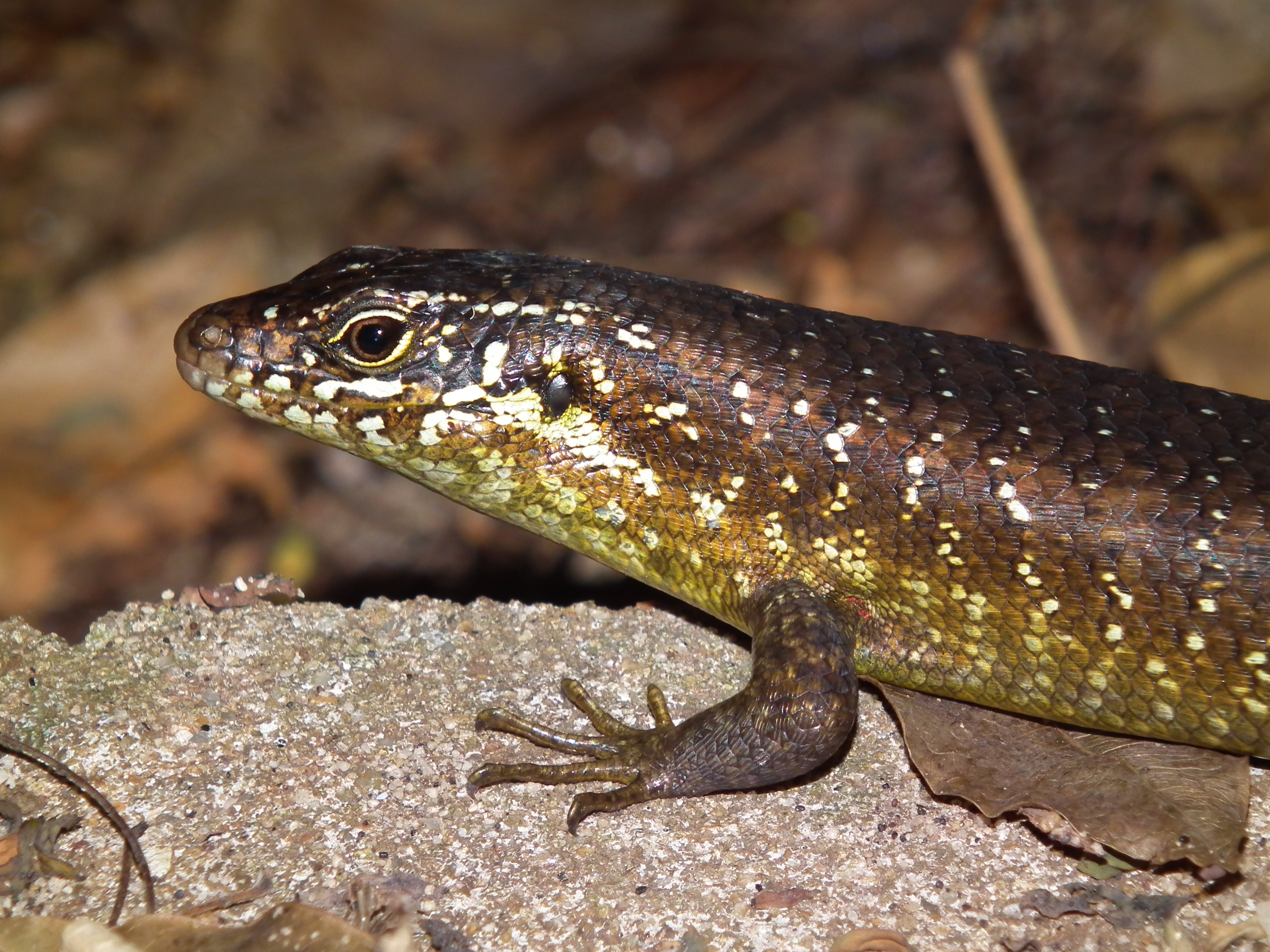

Conservation status
- Least Concern (IUCN 3.1)

Scientific classification
- Kingdom: Animalia
- Phylum: Chordata
- Class: Reptilia
- Order: Squamata
- Family: Gerrhosauridae
- Genus: Zonosaurus
- Species: Z. brygooi

Binomial name
- Zonosaurus brygooi Lang & Böhme, 1990

= Zonosaurus brygooi =

Species of reptile

Zonosaurus brygooi, also known commonly as Brygoo's girdled lizard, is a species of lizard in the family Gerrhosauridae. The species is endemic to Madagascar.

== Etymology ==
The specific name, brygooi, is in honor of French herpetologist Édouard-Raoul Brygoo.

== Geographic range ==
Z. brygooi is found in northeastern Madagascar.

== Habitat ==
The preferred natural habitat of Z. brygooi is forest, at altitudes of 600–850 m (1,970–2,790 ft).

== Description ==
Z. brygooi may attain a total length (including tail) of 30 cm (12 in).

== Reproduction ==
Z. brygooi is oviparous.
