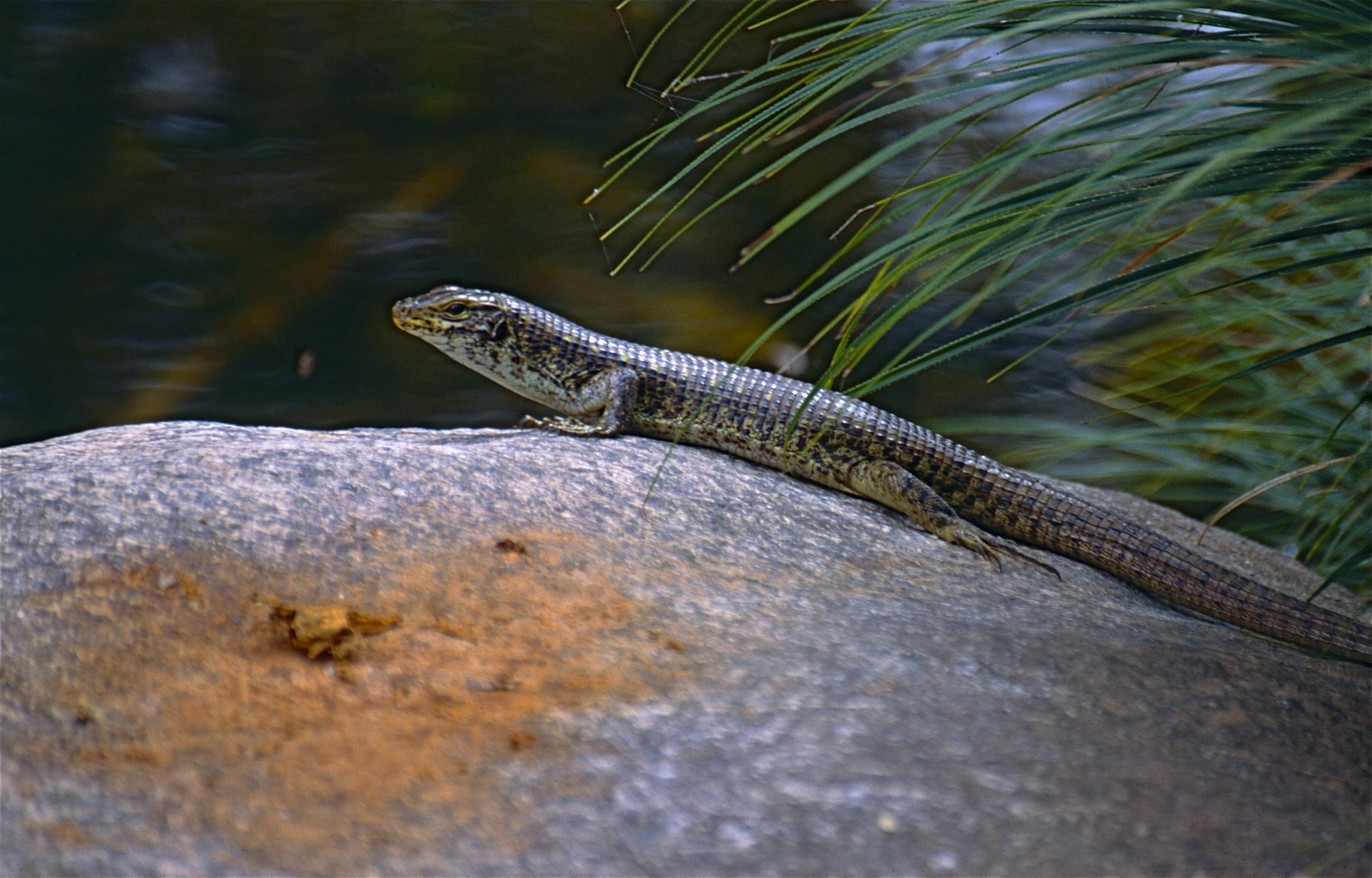

Conservation status
- Vulnerable (IUCN 3.1)

Scientific classification
- Kingdom: Animalia
- Phylum: Chordata
- Class: Reptilia
- Order: Squamata
- Family: Gerrhosauridae
- Genus: Zonosaurus
- Species: Z. maximus

Binomial name
- Zonosaurus maximus Boulenger, 1896

= Zonosaurus maximus =

Species of reptile

Zonosaurus maximus, the southeastern girdled lizard, is a species of lizard in the family Gerrhosauridae. The species is endemic to Madagascar.
