= Blanc's dwarf gecko =

Conservation status
- Vulnerable (IUCN 3.1)

Scientific classification
- Kingdom: Animalia
- Phylum: Chordata
- Class: Reptilia
- Order: Squamata
- Suborder: Gekkota
- Family: Gekkonidae
- Genus: Lygodactylus
- Species: L. blanci

Binomial name
- Lygodactylus blanci G. Pasteur, 1967
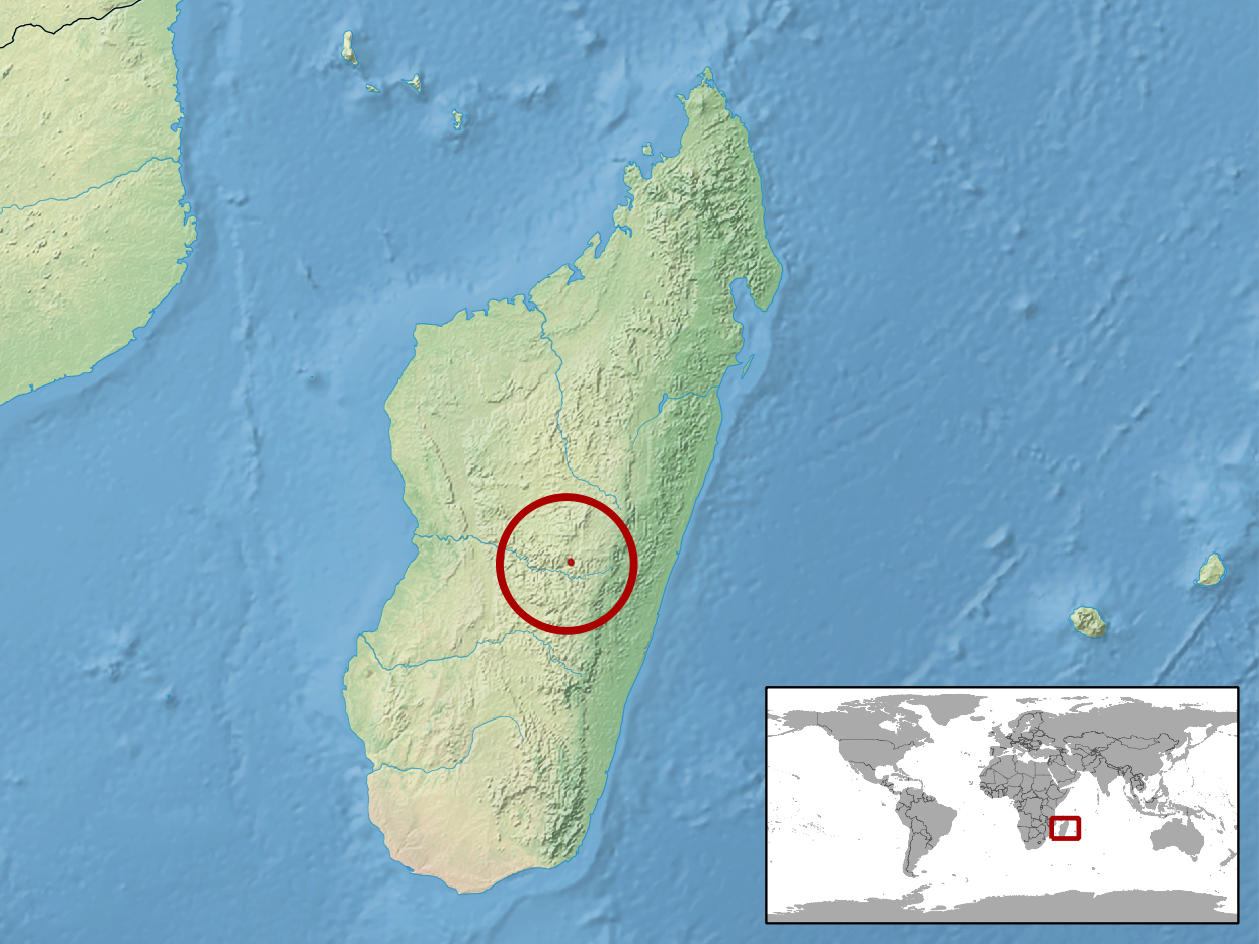

Species of lizard

Blanc's dwarf gecko (Lygodactylus blanci) is a species of lizard in the family Gekkonidae. The species is native to central Madagascar. They are the least known species of dwarf geckos in Madagascar. Blanc's dwarf geckos are one out of eleven gecko species that are protected in Madagascar. Hence, collecting them is only allowed with an appropriate permit.

== Etymology ==
Both the specific name, blanci, and the common name, Blanc's dwarf gecko, are in honor of French herpetologist Charles Pierre Blanc (born 1933).

== Habitat ==
The preferred natural habitat of L. blanci is large rocks. Blanc's dwarf geckos also use buildings and tall trees near freshwater wetlands as their habitat. This species has been observed to be adapted to human environments.

== Description ==
A large species for its genus, L. blanci may attain a snout-to-vent length (SVL) of almost 4 cm (1.6 in). Blanc's dwarf geckos have whorled tails. The throat is usually spotted, which can lead to the formation of longitudinal lines.

== Reproduction ==
Lygodactylus blanci is oviparous. Based on the observations of locals in Madagascar, this species appears to be most active during the month of October and eggs are seen in January and February.

== Threats ==
Mining, logging, wood harvesting, and habitat changes are some of the threats Blanc's dwarf gecko faces to sustain its existence.
