= Grandidierina petiti =

Conservation status
- Near Threatened (IUCN 3.1)

Scientific classification
- Kingdom: Animalia
- Phylum: Chordata
- Class: Reptilia
- Order: Squamata
- Family: Scincidae
- Genus: Grandidierina
- Species: G. petiti

Binomial name
- Grandidierina petiti Angel, 1924
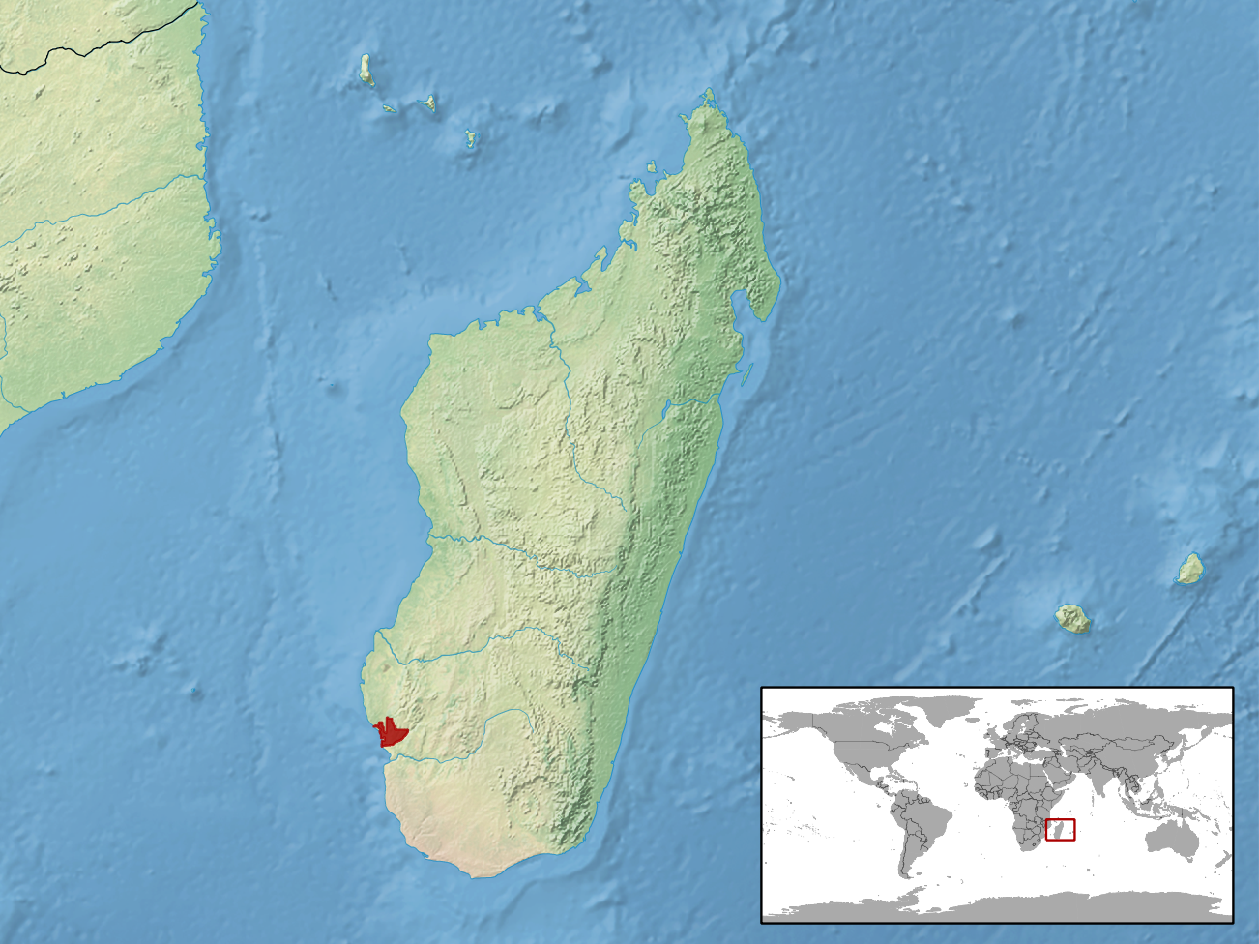

Synonyms
- Voeltzkowia (Grandidierina) petiti (Angel, 1924); Voeltzkowia petiti (Angel, 1924)

Species of reptile

Grandidierina petiti is a species of lizard in the subfamily Scincinae of the family Scincidae. The species is endemic to Madagascar.

== Etymology ==
The specific name, petiti, is in honor of French ornithologist Louis Petit fils (1856–1943).

== Description ==
The eyes of Grandidierina petiti are atrophied and vestigial. There are no external ear openings. The front legs are absent, and the back legs are styliform.

== Geographic distribution ==
Grandidierina petiti is found in southwestern Madagascar.

== Habitat ==
The preferred natural habitat of Grandidierina petiti is dry forest, at elevations from near sea level to 20 m (66 ft).

== Behavior ==
Grandidierina petiti is terrestrial and fossorial.

== Reproduction ==
Grandidierina petiti is oviparous.
