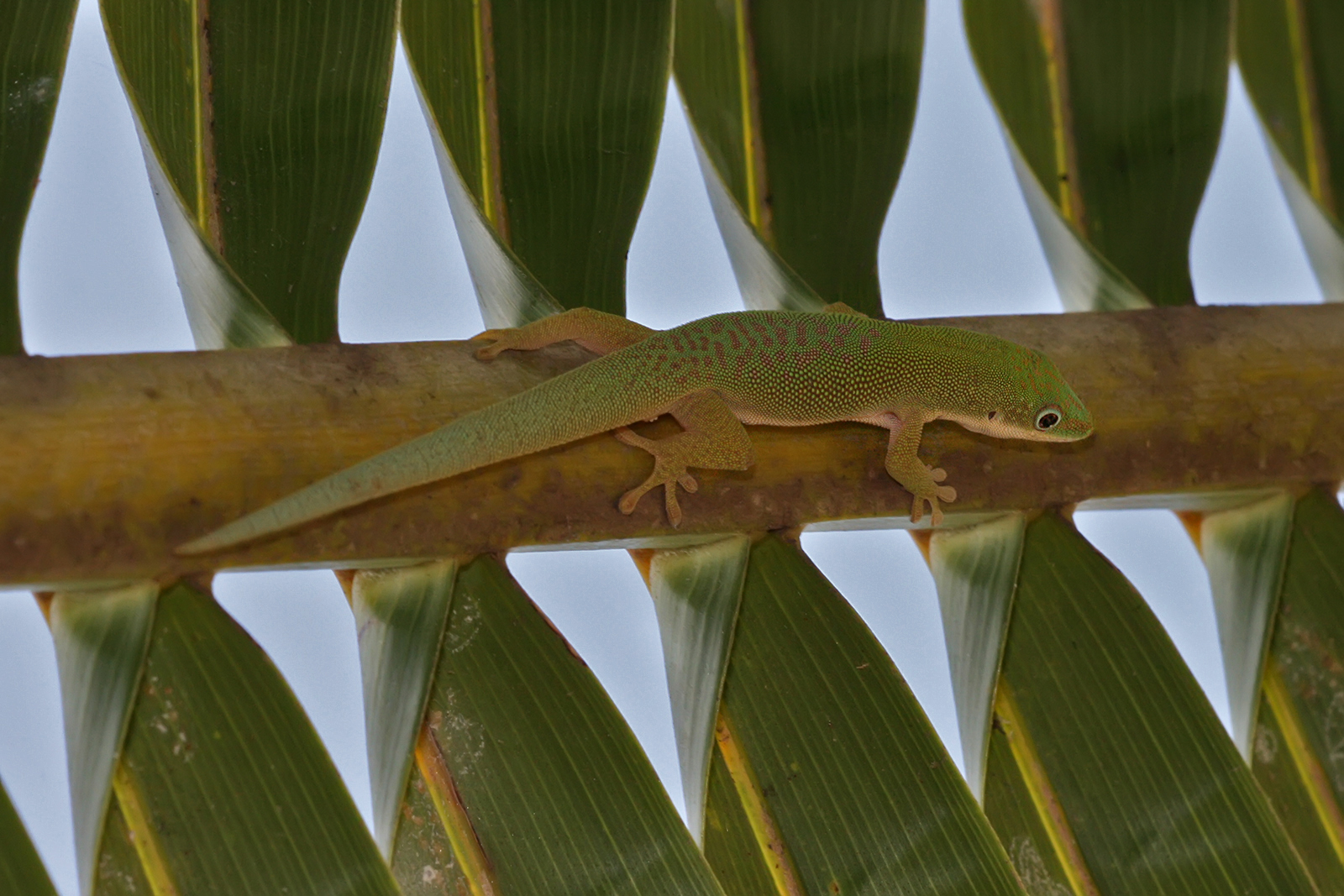

Conservation status
- Least Concern (IUCN 3.1)

Scientific classification
- Kingdom: Animalia
- Phylum: Chordata
- Class: Reptilia
- Order: Squamata
- Suborder: Gekkota
- Family: Gekkonidae
- Genus: Phelsuma
- Species: P. dubia

Binomial name
- Phelsuma dubia Boettger, 1881

= Phelsuma dubia =

Species of lizard

Phelsuma dubia, also known as dull day gecko, olive day gecko, Zanzibar day gecko or green day gecko, is a diurnal species of gecko. It is about 15 centimetres (5.9 in) in length and lives on the western coast of Madagascar, in the Comoros, and the coast of East Africa. It typically inhabits trees and can also be found near human dwellings. The Dull day gecko feeds on insects and nectar.

== Scientific synonyms ==
- Pachydactylus dubius Boettger, 1881
- Phelsuma dubia - Kluge, 1993
- Phelsuma dubia - Glaw & Vences, 1994: 298
- Phelsuma dubia - Broadley & Howell, 1991: 10
- Phelsuma dubia - Rösler, 2000: 101

== Description ==
This lizard belongs to the medium-sized day geckos. It can reach a maximum length of approximately 15 cm. The body colour varies between grayish green, grayish brown and bluish green. The tail may be bright blue. A rust-coloured stripe extends from the nostril to the eye. There is a red v-shaped stripe on the snout. On the back there often are brownish or red-brick coloured dots. A gray lateral stripe extends from the eye to the hind leg. The ventral side is off-white coloured. Juveniles have a light brown dorsal surface with little light blue spots. The tail of neonates is yellow.

== Distribution ==
This species inhabits the west coast of Madagascar in the general area of Majunga. It can also be found in the Comoros, in Zanzibar, and some coastal areas of mainland Tanzania.

== Habitat ==
P. dubia can easily adapt to different biotopes. These day geckos are often found on different trees and other lowland vegetation. They also inhabit buildings as a human commensal.

== Diet ==
These day geckos feed on various insects and other invertebrates. They also like to lick soft, sweet fruit, pollen, nectar and balsamic vinegar.

== Behaviour ==
P. dubia often lives in small groups with one male and several females.

== Reproduction ==
The females are egg gluers. They often lay their eggs in the same location as other females.

== Care and maintenance in captivity ==
Phelsuma dubia is currently common and widespread. However, capture of these geckos is regulated, as it may have caused population declines and, as it is large-scale, might threaten the species in the future.

These animals should be housed in pairs and need a medium-sized terrarium. The temperature should be between 25 and 28 °C. The humidity should be not too high. In captivity, these animals can be fed with crickets, wax moth, fruit flies, meal worms and houseflies.
