= Achille Philippe Raselimanana =

21st century herpetologist from Malagasy

- Education: University of Antananarivo
- Scientific career
- Fields: Herpetology

Achille Philippe Raselimanana is a Malagasy herpetologist.

== Life and research ==
Raselimanana conducted his PhD research at the Université d'Antananarivo on the subject of the systematics and biogeography of Malagasy gerrhosaurs. Before his PhD research began, he was a student of the Ecological Training Program (ETP), founded by Steven M. Goodman in 1993. The ETP would later become the association Vahatra, and Raselimanana its president. As of 2003, he was also the chief biodiversity scientist for WWF Madagascar.

Raselimanana has contributed to research on Malagasy Gerrhosauridae among other reptiles and amphibians, and has served as herpetologist on various faunistic surveys across Madagascar. In addition to the primary literature on Malagasy herpetofauna, Raselimanana has coauthored two French-language field guides to the amphibians of Madagascar.

Raselimanana is a Professor in the Department of Animal Biology at the University of Antananarivo, Madagascar. He serves as associate editor of Vahatra's scientific journal, Malagasy Nature.

== Patronyms ==
In 2017, the frog species Stumpffia achillei was named in honour of Raselimanana.
