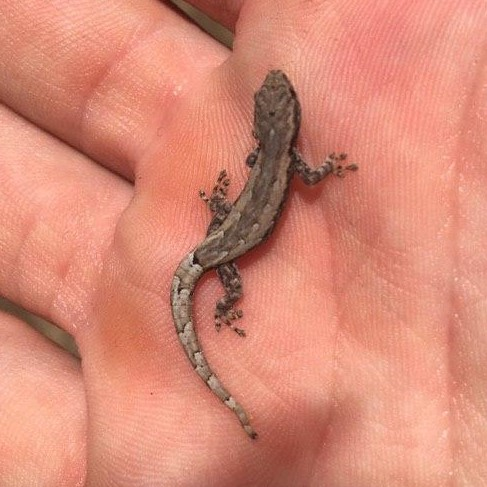

Conservation status
- Least Concern (IUCN 3.1)

Scientific classification
- Kingdom: Animalia
- Phylum: Chordata
- Class: Reptilia
- Order: Squamata
- Suborder: Gekkota
- Family: Gekkonidae
- Genus: Lygodactylus
- Species: L. verticillatus

Binomial name
- Lygodactylus verticillatus Mocquard, 1895
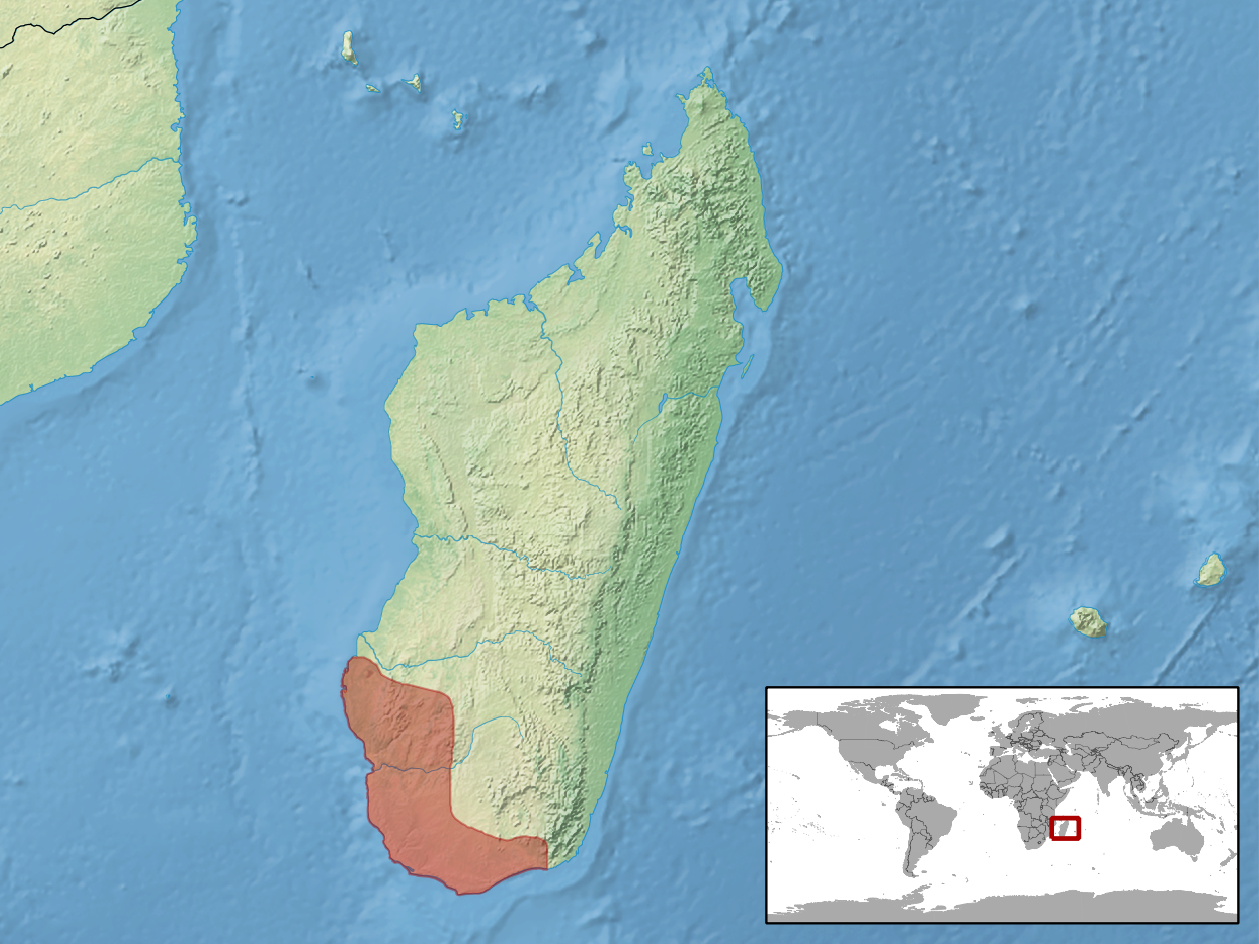

= Mocquard's dwarf gecko =

Species of lizard

Mocquard's dwarf gecko (Lygodactylus verticillatus) is a species of gecko endemic to Madagascar and Europa Island.
