= Grandidierina rubrocaudata =

Conservation status
- Least Concern (IUCN 3.1)

Scientific classification
- Domain: Eukaryota
- Kingdom: Animalia
- Phylum: Chordata
- Class: Reptilia
- Order: Squamata
- Family: Scincidae
- Genus: Grandidierina
- Species: G. rubrocaudata

Binomial name
- Grandidierina rubrocaudata (Grandidier, 1869)

Synonyms
- Voeltzkowia rubrocaudata

Species of skink endemic to Madagascar

Grandidierina rubrocaudata is a species of skink endemic to Madagascar.
