= Brachyseps gastrostictus =

Conservation status
- Data Deficient (IUCN 3.1)

Scientific classification
- Kingdom: Animalia
- Phylum: Chordata
- Class: Reptilia
- Order: Squamata
- Family: Scincidae
- Genus: Brachyseps
- Species: B. gastrostictus

Binomial name
- Brachyseps gastrostictus (O'Shaughnessy, 1879)
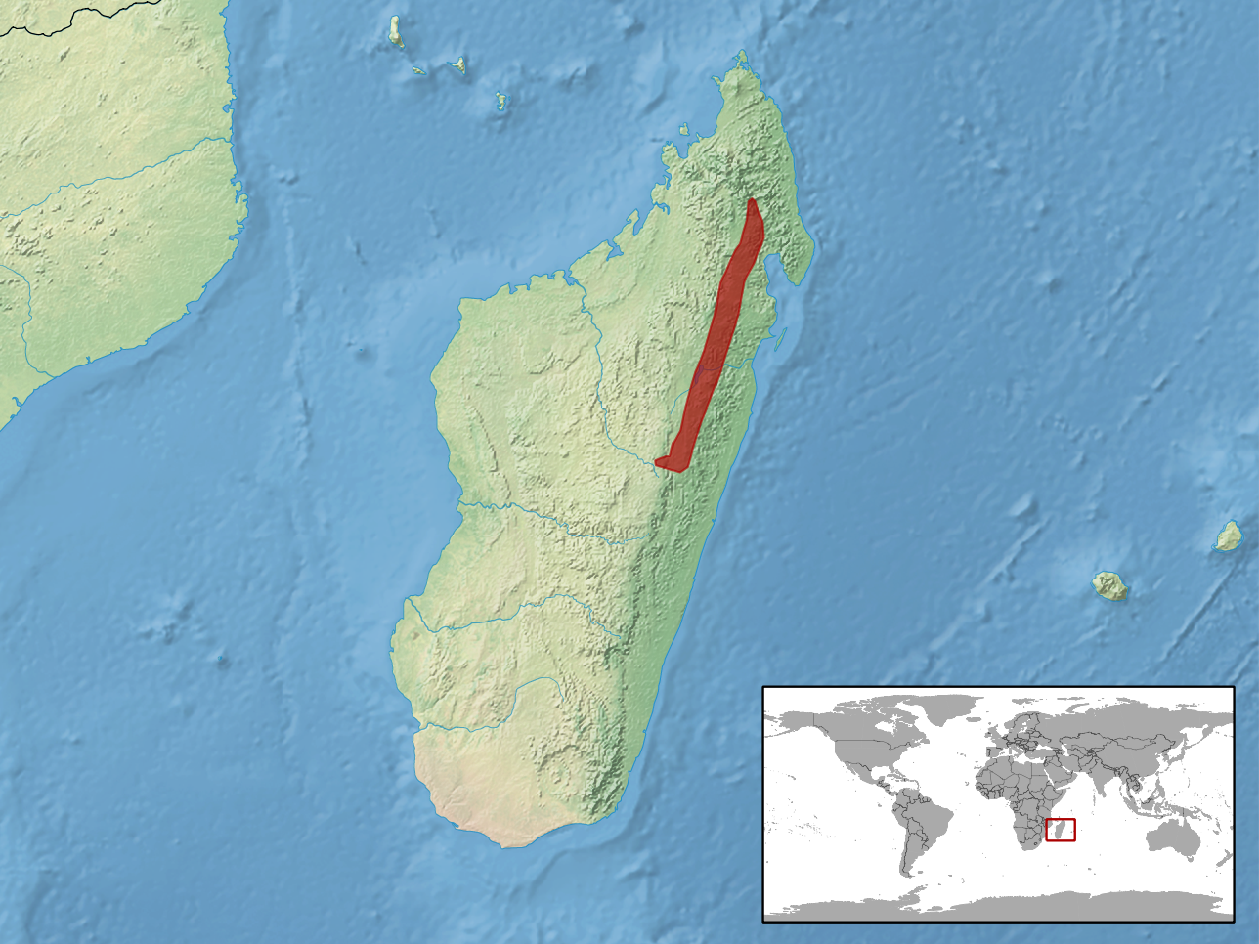

Synonyms
- Amphiglossus gastrostictus

Species of lizard

Brachyseps gastrostictus, O'Shaughnessy's Madagascar skink, is a species of skink endemic to Madagascar.
