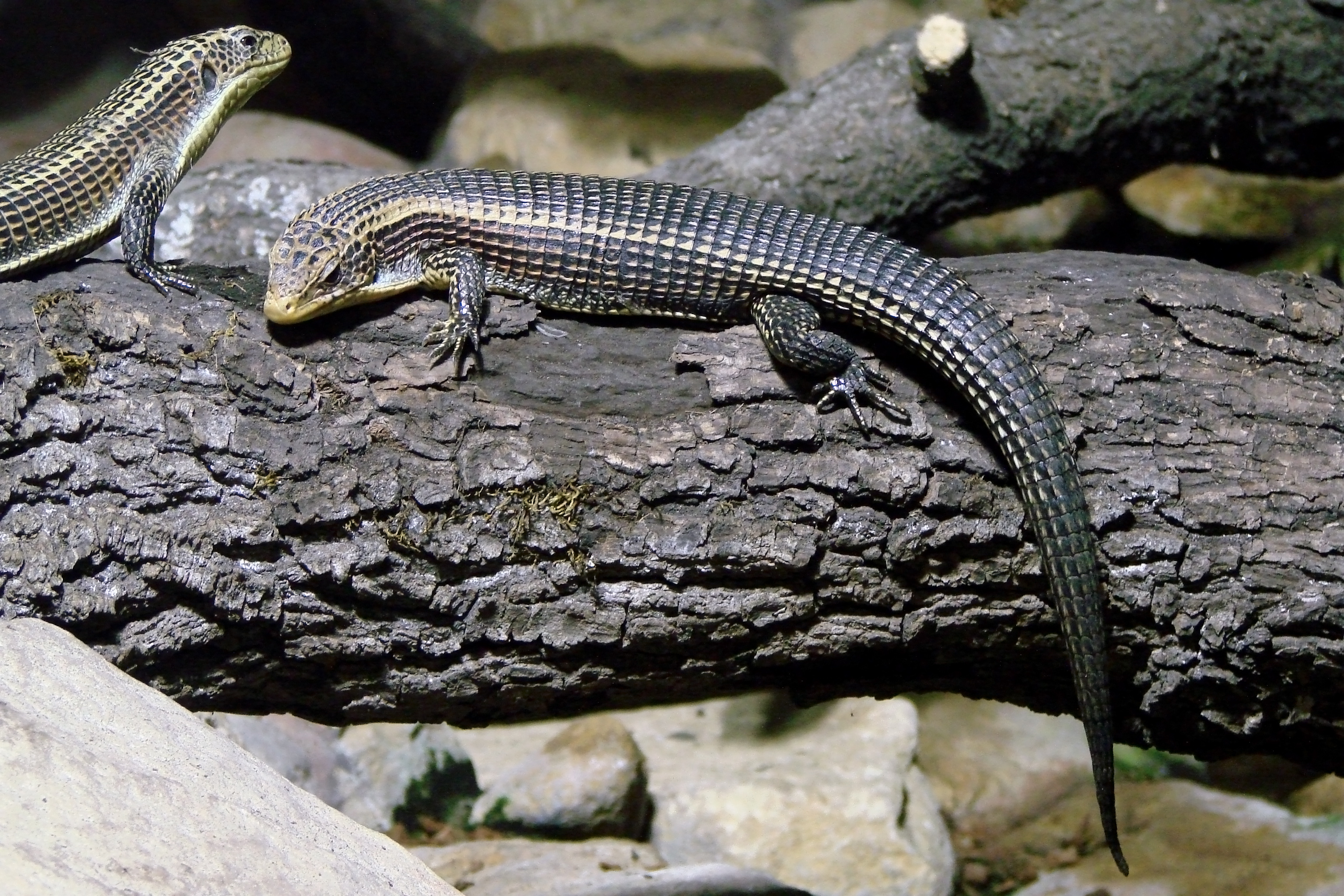
- Broadleysaurus major

Scientific classification
- Kingdom: Animalia
- Phylum: Chordata
- Class: Reptilia
- Order: Squamata
- Infraorder: Scincomorpha
- Clade: Cordyliformes
- Family: Gerrhosauridae; Fitzinger, 1843

= Gerrhosauridae =

Gerrhosauridae Temporal range: Late Maastrichtian to present

Family of lizards

The Gerrhosauridae are a family of lizards native to Africa and Madagascar. They are close relatives of skinks and were once classified in the same family as them.

== Habitat ==
Also known as plated lizards, species in the family Gerrhosauridae live in a range of habitats, from rocky crevices to sand dunes.

== Description ==
Their form is variable, some species having four fully developed limbs, and others having vestigial hind limbs only.

== Reproduction ==
Most species are believed to be oviparous.

== Classification ==
Family Gerrhosauridae

- Subfamily Gerrhosaurinae
  - Genus Broadleysaurus - rough-scaled plated lizard (1 species)
  - Genus Cordylosaurus - blue-black plated lizard (1 species)
  - Genus Gerrhosaurus - (7 species)
  - Genus Matobosaurus - (2 species)
  - Genus Tetradactylus - (8 species)
- Subfamily Zonosaurinae
  - Genus Tracheloptychus - keeled plated lizards (2 species)
  - Genus Zonosaurus - zonosaurs (17 species)

The extinct Konkasaurus from the Late Cretaceous (~66 million years ago) of Madagascar was tentatively identified as a member of the family Cordylidae (the sister group to gerrhosaurids, together forming the Cordyliformes) in its 2003 description. Upon more detailed investigation using micro-CT scans of the available fossils, it was reidentified as a member of the Gerrhosauridae within the subfamily Zonosaurinae.
