= Zig (lizard) =

Scientific classification
- Kingdom: Animalia
- Phylum: Chordata
- Class: Reptilia
- Order: Squamata
- Family: Scincidae
- Genus: Zig; Miralles et al., 2026
- Species: Z. zag

Binomial name
- Zig zag Miralles et al., 2026
- Localities in Madagascar from which Zig is known

Genus of lizards

Zig is a genus of lizard in the family Scincidae, endemic to the white sand regions of the Mahajanga basin of Madagascar. The genus contains a single species, Zig zag, which is closely related to Paracontias and Madascincus, two other Malagasy genera in the subfamily Scincinae. Zig is characterized by an elongate, completely limbless body and the absence of opening eyes. The dorsum is a light beige-gold in color, while the underside is a much darker, almost black, shade.

== Etymology ==
The species name, Zig zag, is formed as an "arbitrary combination of letters", (Note: The International Code of Zoological Nomenclature (ICZN) regards binomial names not explicitly formed from Greek or Latin as "arbitrary combination[s] of letters".) alluding to the characteristic sinusoidal zigzag-shaped tracks this species leaves when moving over the sand.

== Classification ==
In their 2026 description of Zig, Miralles and colleagues tested its phylogenetic relationships with other members of the Scincinae. They consistently recovered it in a clade comprising Madascincus and Paracontias, with Zig as the sister taxon to the latter in two of the three analyses performed. The results of their genome-wide restriction-associated DNA sequencing (RADseq) analysis are displayed in the cladogram below, showing the relationships of Zig with other Malagasy scincine genera:

- - - Madascincus
    - - Paracontias
      - Zig
  - - Pseudoacontias
    - - - Brachyseps
        - Grandidierina
      - - Flexiseps
        - - Pygomeles
          - - Amphiglossus
            - Voeltzkowia

The researchers further estimated the temporal divergence times of the tested genera using molecular data. They determined that Zig diverged from Paracontias 36 ± 17.8 million years ago, likely near the Eocene–Oligocene transition (~34 million years ago). The clade containing Zig and Paracontias likely diverged from Madascincus around 39.1 ± 19 MA.
