= Vesey-Fitzgerald (disambiguation) =

Vesey-Fitzgerald may refer to:

== Surname ==
- Vesey-Fitzgerald

== Other uses ==
- Vesey-Fitzgerald's burrowing skink, a species of lizard in the family Scincinae
