= Green blood =

Green blood may refer to:

- Green Blood (manga), a Japanese manga series by Masasumi Kakizaki
- Hemocyanin, a copper-based system of transporting oxygen in blood found in many molluscs and arthropods
- Sulfhemoglobinemia, a rare condition in humans caused by excess sulfhemoglobin in the blood
- Prasinohaema (Greek: "green blood"), a genus of skinks whose blood color is caused by an excess of the bile pigment biliverdin
  - Prasinohaema virens, also known as the green-blooded skink, native to New Guinea

== See also ==
- Red blood (disambiguation)
