= Gardiner's burrowing skink =

Conservation status
- Near Threatened (IUCN 3.1)

Scientific classification
- Kingdom: Animalia
- Phylum: Chordata
- Class: Reptilia
- Order: Squamata
- Family: Scincidae
- Genus: Pamelaescincus; Greer, 1970
- Species: P. gardineri

Binomial name
- Pamelaescincus gardineri (Boulenger, 1909)
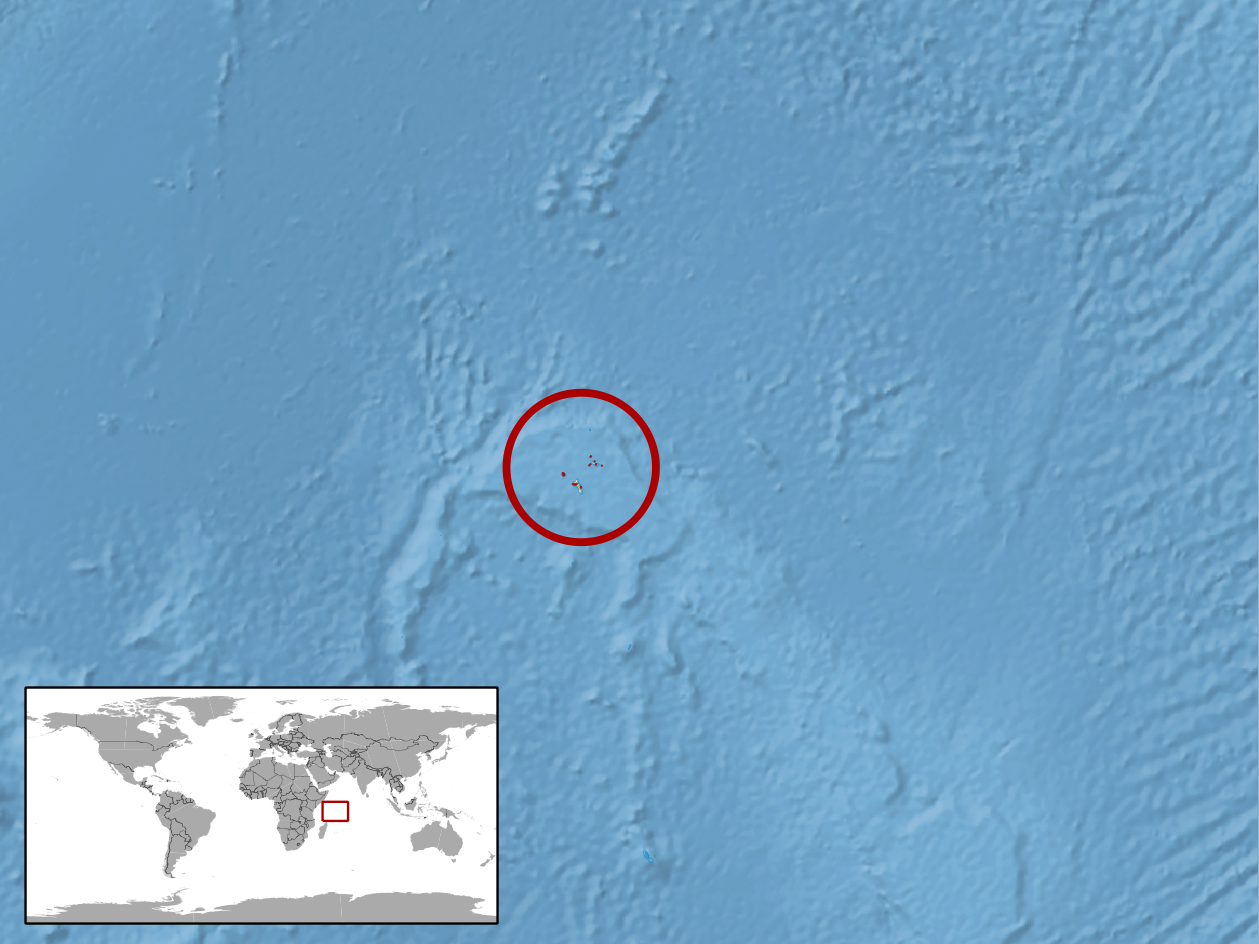

Synonyms
- Scelotes gardineri Boulenger, 1909; Amphiglossus gardineri — Vesey-Fitzgerald & H. Parker, 1947; Pamelaescincus gardineri — Greer, 1970; Scelotes gardineri — P. Evans & J. Evans, 1980; Pamelaescincus gardineri — Austin & Arnold, 2006

Species of reptile

Gardiner's burrowing skink (Pamelaescincus gardineri) is a species of lizard in the family Scincidae. P. gardineri is the only species in the (monotypic) skink genus Pamelaescincus. The species is endemic to the Seychelles.

== Etymology ==
The generic name, Pamelaescincus, is in honor of Pamela, the older of Allen E. Greer's two sisters.

The specific name, gardineri, is in honor of British zoologist John Stanley Gardiner.

== Taxonomy ==
Pamelaescincus gardineri is usually placed in the subfamily Scincinae, which seems to be paraphyletic. Probably quite close to Janetaescincus, it belongs to a major clade that does not seem to include the type genus Scincus. Thus, it will probably be eventually assigned to a new, yet-to-be-named subfamily.

== Geographic range ==
Pamelaescincus gardineri is found only in the Seychelles.

== Habitat and behavior ==
The natural habitats of Pamelaescincus gardineri are subtropical or tropical dry forests and subtropical or tropical moist lowland forests, at altitudes from sea level to 1,600 m (5,200 ft), where it burrows in the leaf litter and soil.

== Reproduction ==
Pamelaescincus gardineri is oviparous.

== Conservation status ==
Populations of Pamelaescincus gardeneri are locally affected by introduced predators and habitat destruction, but unlike its relatives, it is not considered an endangered species by the IUCN.
