= Pygomeles petteri =

Conservation status
- Endangered (IUCN 3.1)

Scientific classification
- Kingdom: Animalia
- Phylum: Chordata
- Class: Reptilia
- Order: Squamata
- Family: Scincidae
- Genus: Pygomeles
- Species: P. petteri

Binomial name
- Pygomeles petteri G. Pasteur & Paulian, 1962
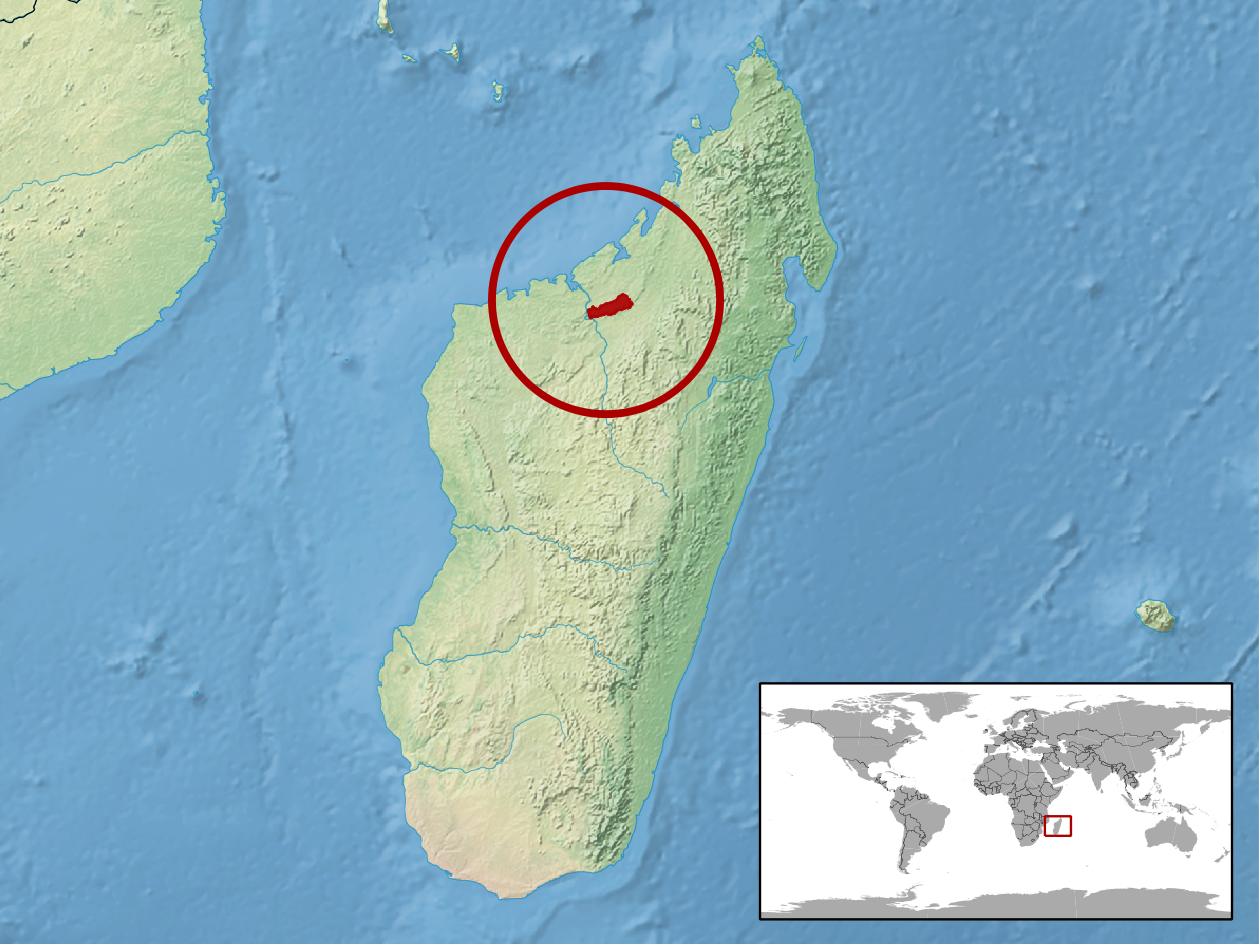

Species of reptile

Pygomeles petteri, also known commonly as Petter's short skink, is a species of lizard in the subfamily Scincinae of the family Scincidae (skinks). The species is endemic to Madagascar.

== Etymology ==
The specific name petteri, is in honor of French zoologist Francis Petter.

== Description ==
Pygomeles petteri has no legs, and it has no visible external ear openings.

== Geographic distribution ==
Pygomeles petteri is found in northwestern Madagascar.

== Habitat ==
The preferred natural habitat of Pygomeles petteri is dry forest with sandy soil, at elevations of 50–300 m (160–980 ft).

== Behavior ==
Pygomeles petteri is terrestrial and fossorial.

== Reproduction ==
The mode of reproduction of Pygomeles petteri is unknown.
