= Susan Perkins (scientist) =

American microbiologist

- Education: University of Vermont, State University of New York at Potsdam
- Occupations: Researcher; microbiologist; biologist
- Awards: Fellow of the American Association for the Advancement of Science (2024)
- Scientific career
- Fields: Biology, microbiology, genomics, parasite
- Workplaces: American Museum of Natural History (2004–2019); City College of New York (2020–); State University of New York at Potsdam
- Website: www.susanperkins.net

Susan L. Perkins is an American microbiologist and the Martin and Michele Cohen Dean of Science at The City College of New York (CCNY). Her expertise includes the pathology and genetics of malaria parasites and other haemosporidians infecting myriad non-primate species.

== Career ==
Perkins obtained her BA degree in Biology (minor in Chemistry), at the State University of New York at Potsdam in 1993, and graduated with her PhD in biology at the University of Vermont in 2000. In 2018 Perkins was appointed President of the American Society of Parasitologists, having been vice-president since 2016. She served as professor of microbial genomics and curator at the American Museum of Natural History (AMNH) for 15 years before joining CCNY as dean of science in 2020.

Perkins and colleague Rob DeSalle co-curated an exhibition at AMNH in 2015 entitled "The Secret World inside You".

In February 2018 Perkins developed a database of PhD students, postdocs and other junior researchers for consideration as peer reviewers in ecology and evolution studies, given a lack of early-career scientists being selected for the in-demand labor.

== Research ==
Since early in her career, Perkins has been building phylogenetic relationships of the Plasmodium malaria parasites in order to investigate the evolutionary history of the disease-causing organisms. This includes one of the first studies to identify the close relationship between rodent and primate malarias, the former often used in experimental research and the latter including the major human species P. falciparum. Perkins' research has further expanded this analysis to include diverse species of Plasmodium from across the genus, covering less studied parasites infecting hosts such as bats and lizards. By sequencing a subset of genes from the widest array of Plasmodium spp. samples at the time, Perkins' and her team found that the group is more diverse than previously thought, and that using a single generic name (that is, Plasmodium) probably isn't suitable for all the disparate lineages. Many of the traits seen as significant for the parasites, such as the ability to reproduce asexually in the blood cells of hosts, actually originated independently multiple times.

Detailed sampling of malaria parasites in bats showed that the strains they carry are similar to those that infect other mammals, and are highly prevalent in the sampled population (about 40% of bats were infected). This suggests that bats have extreme tolerance to the infection, a feature that has been observed for other diseases and makes them potent reservoirs for cross-species (zoonotic) infection. The lower pathogenicity in bats may be associated with how these parasites reproduce more in the liver compared to species infecting humans. Furthermore, the predicted phylogenetic trajectories suggest that the parasites jumped between different host species multiple times, including between bats and rodents.

Perkins' investigations into malaria species infecting lizards has revealed mechanisms of infection as well as host resistance. Perkins showed in 2000 that the malaria parasite species Plasmodium azurophilum identified in Caribbean Anolis lizards is actually two separate species; one that infects red blood cells and one that uniquely infects white blood cells. Green-blooded skinks in New Guinea have characteristically green-colored blood due to high levels of biliverdin bile, which would be toxic in other species but the skinks have adapted to. This may be because it could function as anti-malarial protection, similar to the protective effect of bilirubin against human malaria, which would explain why 'green blood' may have evolved independently four times among surveyed reptiles.
