= Green tree skink =

Green tree skink can refer to several skink species:

- Lamprolepis smaragdina, widespread from East Asia to Melanesia, otherwise known as "Emerald tree skink"
- Prasinohaema virens, endemic to New Guinea, otherwise known as "Green green-blooded skink"
