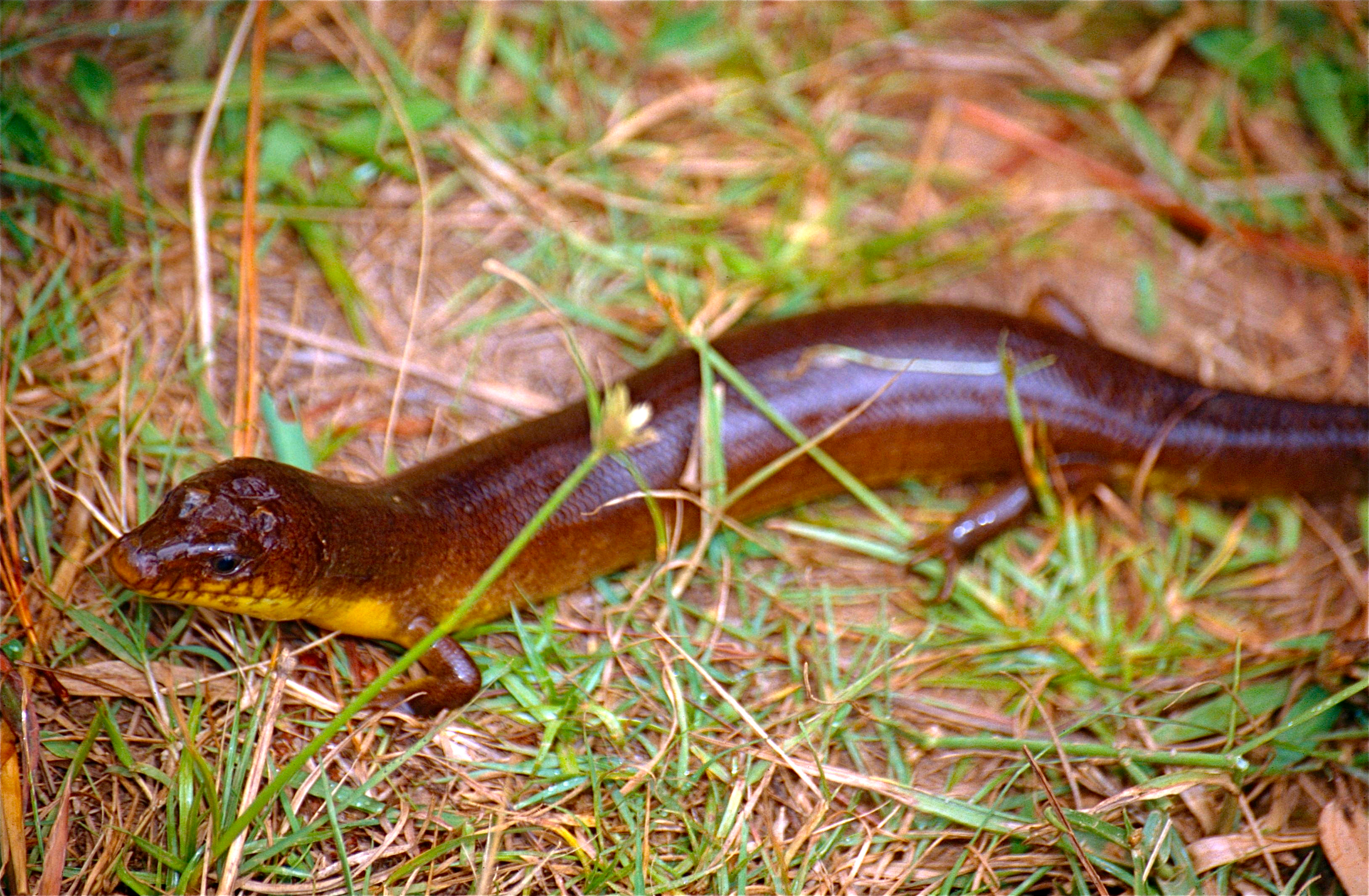
- Amphiglossus astrolabi

Scientific classification
- Kingdom: Animalia
- Phylum: Chordata
- Class: Reptilia
- Order: Squamata
- Family: Scincidae
- Subfamily: Scincinae
- Genus: Amphiglossus; A.M.C. Duméril & Bibron, 1839

Species
- Two, see text.

= Amphiglossus =

Genus of lizards

Amphiglossus is a genus of skinks, lizards in the family Scincidae.

== Taxonomy ==
The genus Amphiglossus is usually placed in the subfamily Scincinae, which seems to be paraphyletic, however. Probably quite close to Paracontias and possibly Androngo trivittatus, it belongs to a major clade which does not seem to include the type genus Scincus. Thus, it will probably be eventually assigned to a new, yet-to-be-named subfamily.

== Species ==
The following species are recognized as being valid. Some species which were formerly included in the genus Amphiglossus have been assigned to a more recently created genus, Madascincus Brygoo, 1982, some to the genera Flexiseps and Brachyseps, and some species have been synonymized with other species in the genus Amphiglossus.

- Amphiglossus astrolabi A.M.C. Duméril & Bibron, 1839 – diving skink
- Amphiglossus reticulatus (Kaudern, 1922)

Nota bene: In the above list, a binomial authority in parentheses indicates that the species was originally described in a genus other than Amphiglossus.
