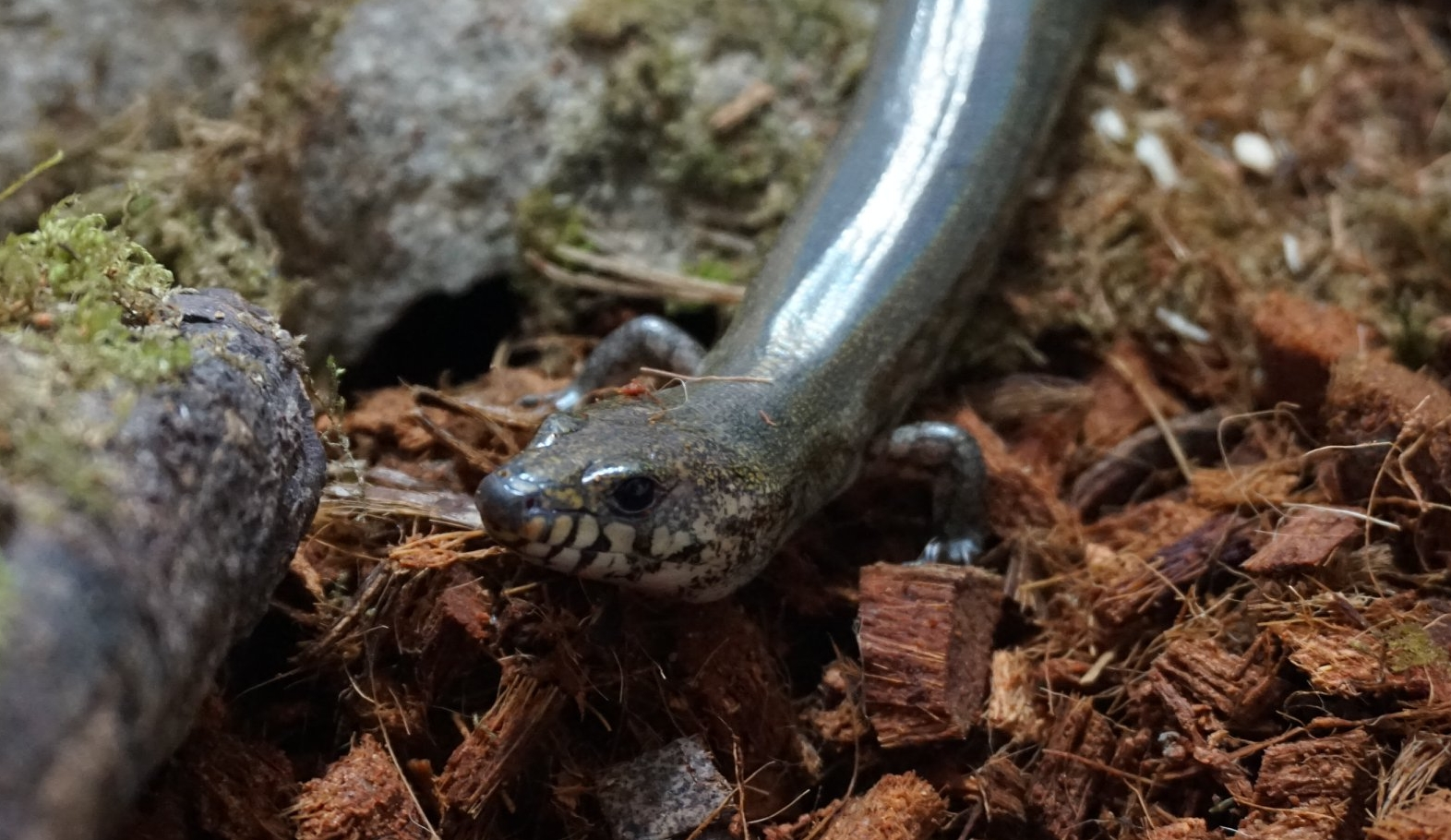

Conservation status
- Least Concern (IUCN 3.1)

Scientific classification
- Kingdom: Animalia
- Phylum: Chordata
- Class: Reptilia
- Order: Squamata
- Family: Scincidae
- Genus: Amphiglossus
- Species: A. reticulatus

Binomial name
- Amphiglossus reticulatus (Kaudern, 1922)

= Amphiglossus reticulatus =

Species of lizard

Amphiglossus reticulatus is a species of skink. It is endemic to Madagascar.
