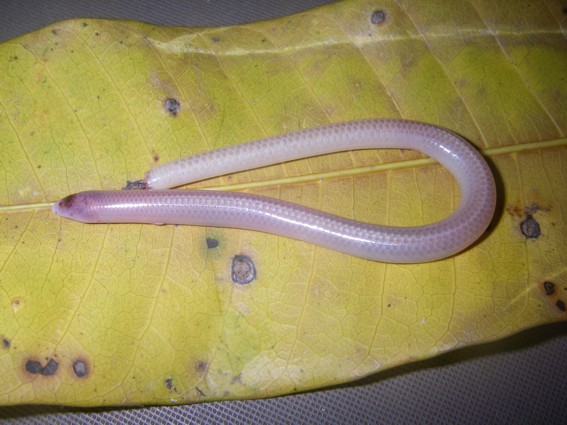

Scientific classification
- Kingdom: Animalia
- Phylum: Chordata
- Class: Reptilia
- Order: Squamata
- Family: Scincidae
- Genus: Voeltzkowia
- Species: V. mobydick

Binomial name
- Voeltzkowia mobydick (Miralles et al., 2012)
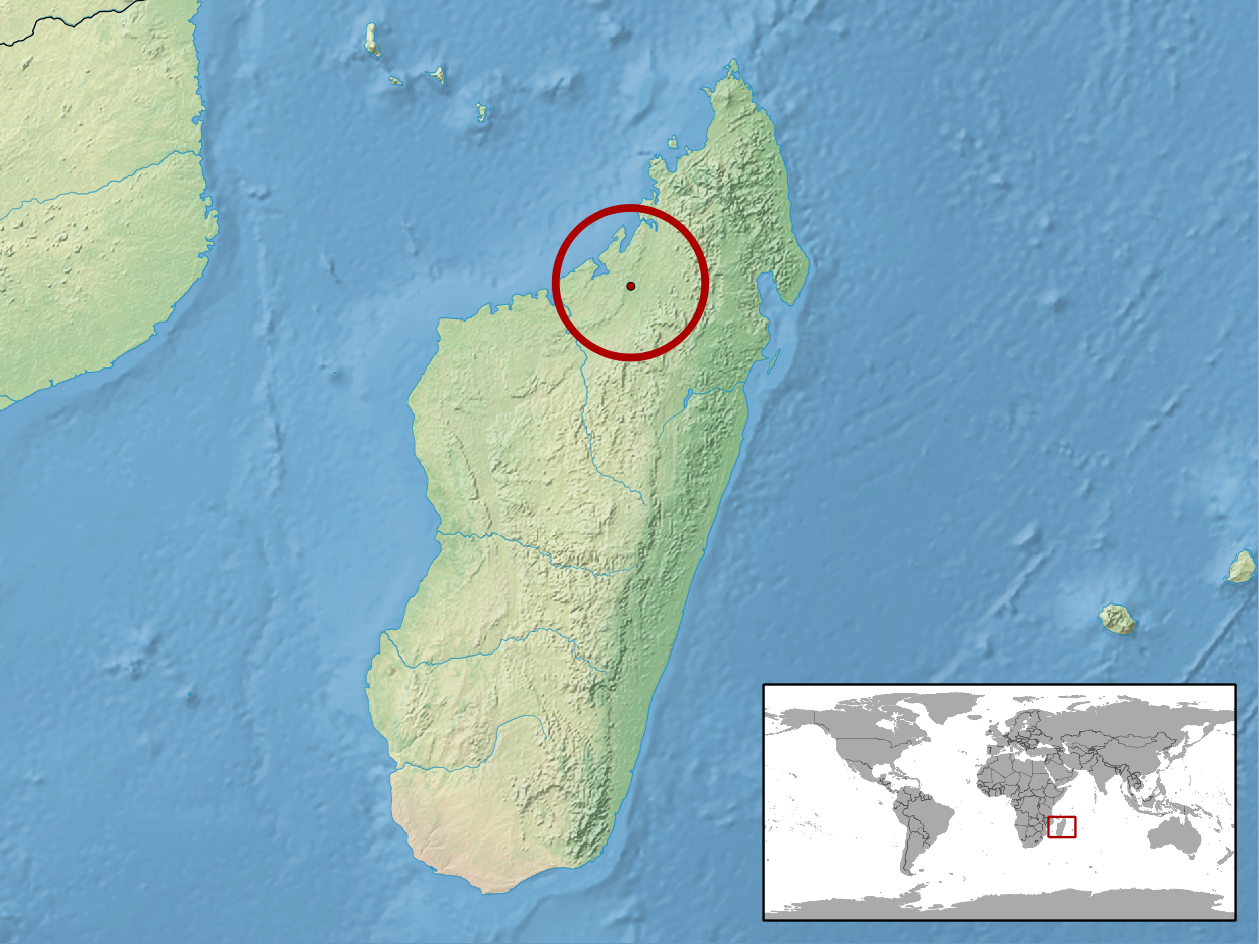
- Distribution of V. mobydick in Madagascar.

Synonyms
- Sirenoscincus mobydick Miralles et al., 2012; Voeltzkowia mobydick — Miralles et al., 2015

= Voeltzkowia mobydick =

Species of lizard

Voeltzkowia mobydick is a species of mermaid skink, a lizard in the family Scincidae. In 2012, the species was first described in a paper by French herpetologists Aurélien Miralles, Miguel Vences, and their colleagues.

== Description ==
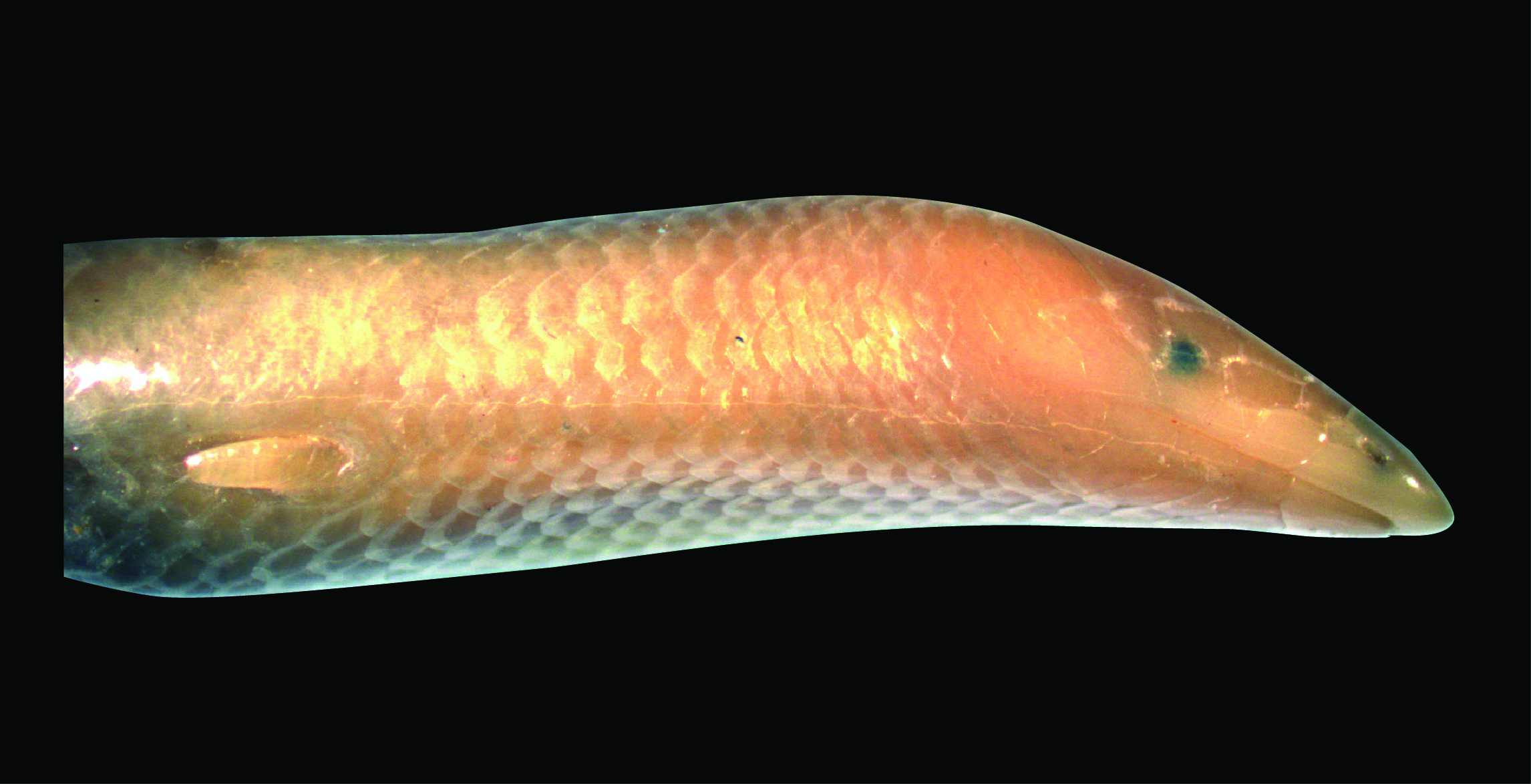
Head and forelimbs of V. mobydick.

Mermaid skinks have only forelimbs, no hind limbs, hence the common name "mermaid skink". This species's forelimbs are shaped like flippers (Voeltzkowia yamagishii has claws). The scientific name Voeltzkowia mobydick consists of the pre-existing parent genus Voeltzkowia, and the name of the white sperm whale from the 1851 novel Moby-Dick by Herman Melville. The species name is appropriate because whales have no hind limbs, only forelimbs shaped like flippers, and so does this species of skink. It also lacks pigmentation as Moby Dick did.

The type series consists of two specimens that measured 67–71 mm (2.6–2.8 in) in snout–vent length. The body is about 4 mm (0.16 in) wide at midbody. In preserved specimens, body is entirely pale with eyes visible as dark spots. Colour is assumed to be pinkish in live animals.

== Distribution ==
This species is endemic to Madagascar, specifically the Sofia Region. The type locality is the urban commune of Boriziny (French: Port-Bergé), Sofia Region, Madagascar.

== Taxonomy ==
In 2015 it was reassigned to the genus Voeltzkowia, as Voeltzkowia mobydick, by Miralles et al.
