= Janetaescincus =

Scientific classification
- Kingdom: Animalia
- Phylum: Chordata
- Class: Reptilia
- Order: Squamata
- Family: Scincidae
- Subfamily: Scincinae
- Genus: Janetaescincus; Greer, 1970

Species
- Two, see text.

Genus of lizards

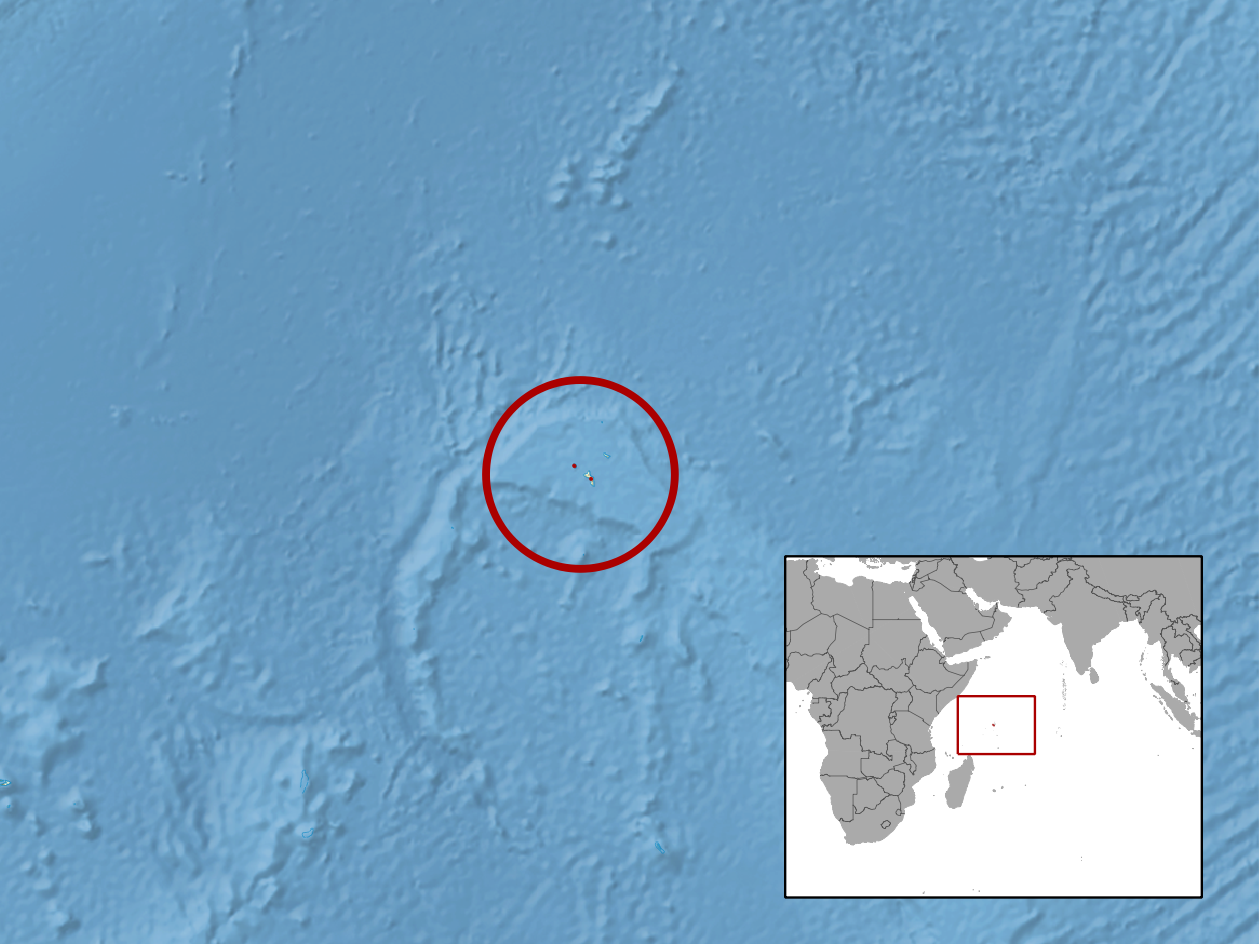
geographic distribution of Janetaescincus braueri

Janetaescincus is a genus of burrowing skinks in the family Scincidae. The genus is endemic to the Seychelles. There are two recognized species.

== Etymology ==
The generic name, Janetaescincus, is in honor of Janet Greer, who is the younger of the two sisters of Australian herpetologist Allen E. Greer.

== Taxonomy ==
The genus Janetaescincus is usually placed in the subfamily Scincinae, which seems to be paraphyletic however. Probably quite close to Pamelaescincus gardineri, the genus Janetaescincus belongs to a major clade which does not seem to include the type genus Scincus. Thus, Janetaescincus will probably be eventually assigned to a new, yet-to-be-named subfamily. (Austin & Arnold 2006)

== Species ==
Two species are recognized as being valid.

- Janetaescincus braueri (Boettger, 1896)
- Janetaescincus veseyfitzgeraldi (Parker, 1947)

Nota bene: A binomial authority in parentheses indicates that the species was originally described in a genus other than Janetaescincus.
