= Proscelotes eggeli =

Conservation status
- Near Threatened (IUCN 3.1)

Scientific classification
- Kingdom: Animalia
- Phylum: Chordata
- Class: Reptilia
- Order: Squamata
- Family: Scincidae
- Genus: Proscelotes
- Species: P. eggeli

Binomial name
- Proscelotes eggeli (Tornier, 1902)

Synonyms
- Scelotes eggeli Tornier, 1902; Proscelotes eggeli — Broadley & Howell, 1991

Species of reptile

Proscelotes eggeli, also known commonly as the Usambara five-toed skink, is a species of lizard in the family Scincidae. The species is endemic to Tanzania.

== Etymology ==
The specific name, eggeli, is in honor of a German army physician, "Dr. Eggel", who collected reptiles in Africa for Tornier.

== Habitat ==
The preferred natural habitat of P. eggeli is forest.

== Reproduction ==
P. eggeli has been reported to be oviparous and ovoviviparous.
