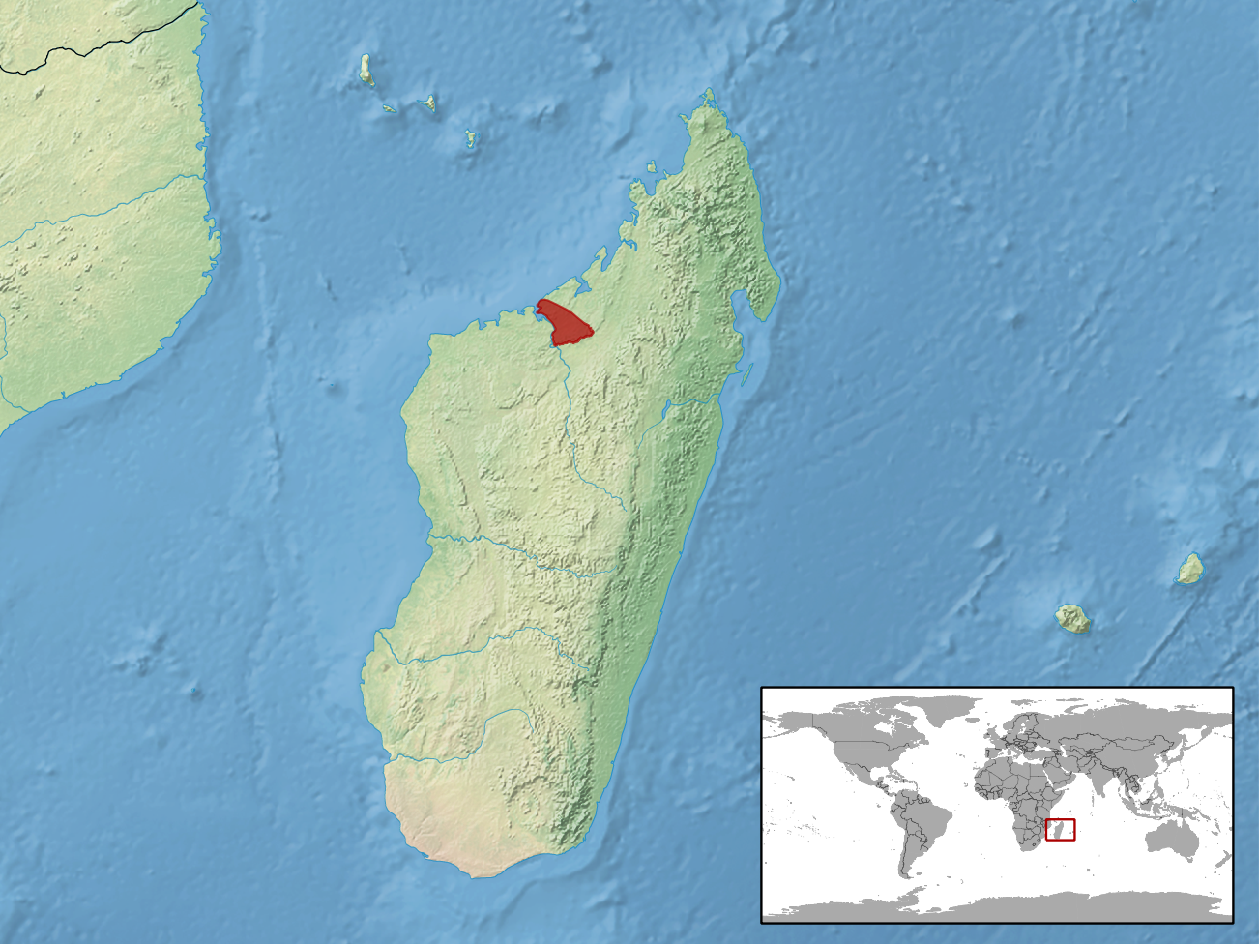
- Map detailing the geographic distribution of Voeltzkowia mira skink in Madagascar

Conservation status
- Endangered (IUCN 3.1)

Scientific classification
- Kingdom: Animalia
- Phylum: Chordata
- Class: Reptilia
- Order: Squamata
- Family: Scincidae
- Genus: Voeltzkowia
- Species: V. mira

Binomial name
- Voeltzkowia mira Boettger, 1893

= Voeltzkowia mira =

Species of reptile

Voeltzkowia mira is a species of skink which is endemic to Madagascar.
