= Pseudoacontias angelorum =

Conservation status
- Endangered (IUCN 3.1)

Scientific classification
- Kingdom: Animalia
- Phylum: Chordata
- Class: Reptilia
- Order: Squamata
- Family: Scincidae
- Genus: Pseudoacontias
- Species: P. angelorum

Binomial name
- Pseudoacontias angelorum (Nussbaum & Raxworthy, 1995)
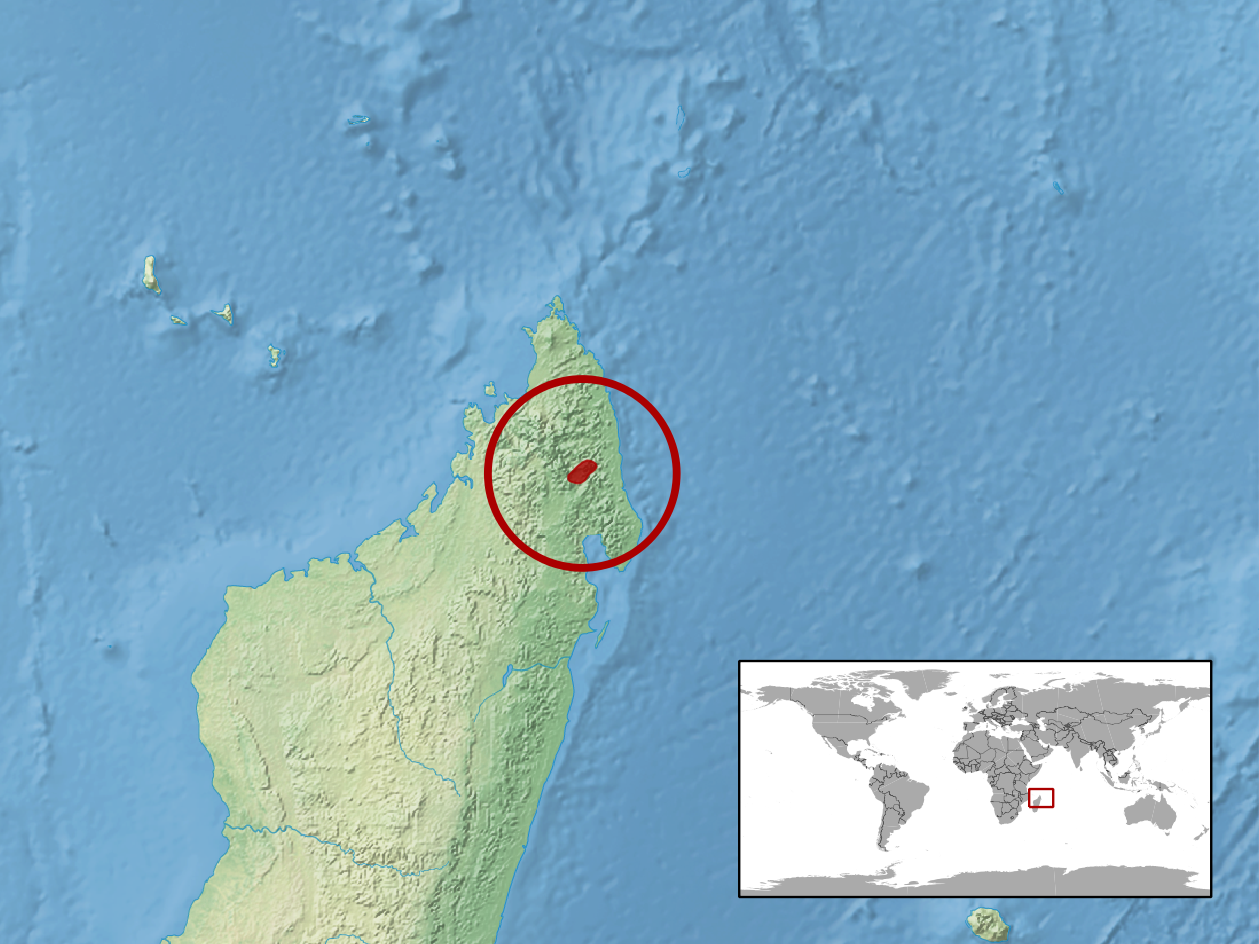

Species of reptile

Pseudoacontias angelorum is a species of skink, a lizard in the family Scincidae. The species is endemic to Madagascar.

== Etymology ==
The specific name, angelorum (masculine, genitive, plural), is in honor of twin brothers Angelien and Angeluc Razafimanantsoa who are Malagasy naturalists.

== Geographic range ==
P. angelorum is found in northeastern Madagascar.

== Habitat ==
The preferred natural habitat of P. angelorum is primary rainforest.

== Description ==
P. angelorum has no front legs, and its back legs are flap-like and styliform.

== Reproduction ==
The mode of reproduction of P. angelorum is unknown.
