= Proscelotes =

Scientific classification
- Domain: Eukaryota
- Kingdom: Animalia
- Phylum: Chordata
- Class: Reptilia
- Order: Squamata
- Family: Scincidae
- Subfamily: Scincinae
- Genus: Proscelotes de Witte & Laurent, 1943

Genus of lizards

Proscelotes is a genus of skinks. The genus is endemic to Africa.

== Species ==
The genus Proscelotes contains the following three species.

- Proscelotes aenea (Barbour & Loveridge, 1928) – montane skink
- Proscelotes arnoldi (Hewitt, 1932) – Arnold's montane skink
- Proscelotes eggeli (Tornier, 1902) – Usambara five-toed skink

Nota bene: A binomial authority in parentheses indicates that the species was originally described in a genus other than Proscelotes.
