= Pygomeles braconnieri =

Conservation status
- Least Concern (IUCN 3.1)

Scientific classification
- Kingdom: Animalia
- Phylum: Chordata
- Class: Reptilia
- Order: Squamata
- Family: Scincidae
- Genus: Pygomeles
- Species: P. braconnieri

Binomial name
- Pygomeles braconnieri Grandidier, 1867
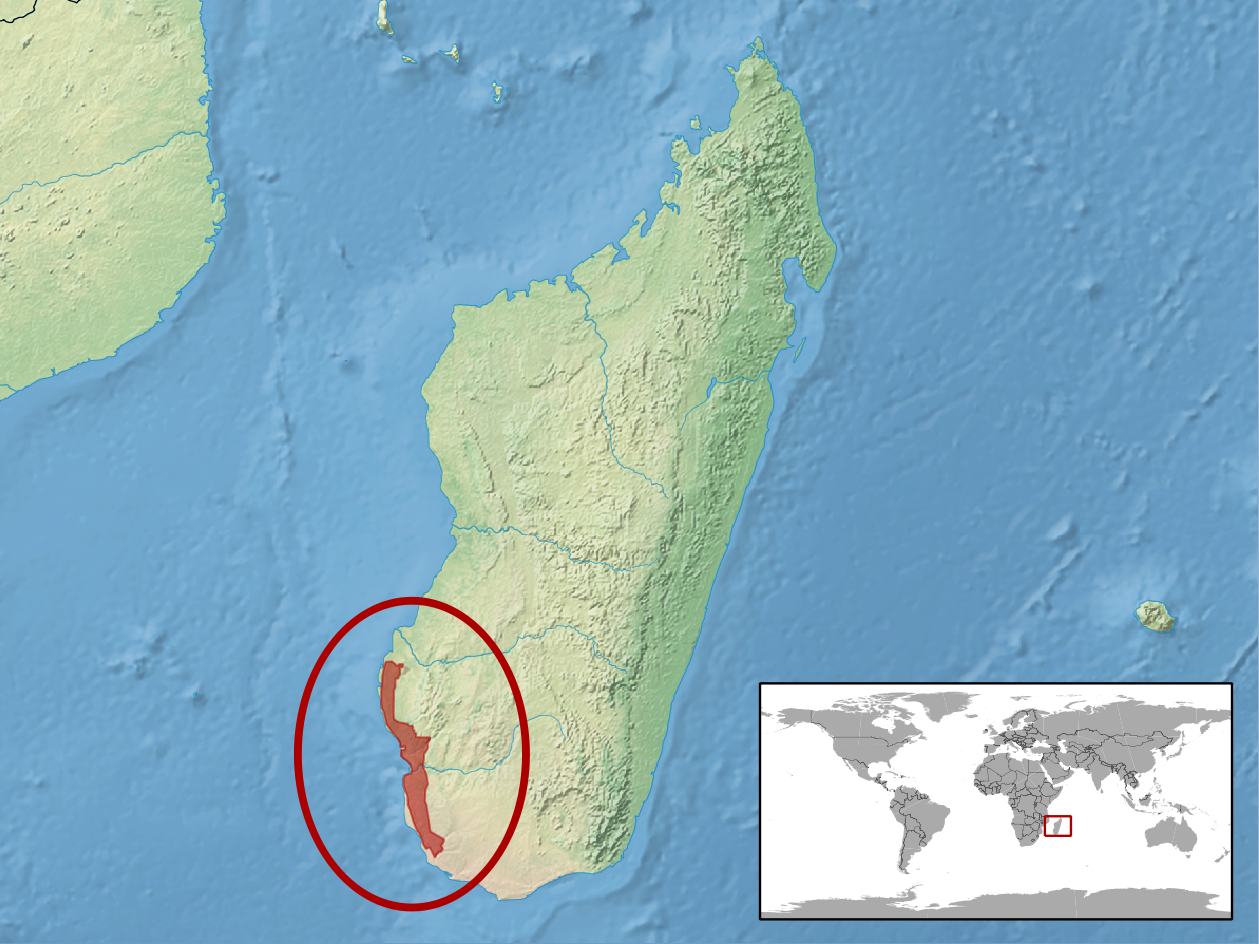

Species of reptile

Pygomeles braconnieri, also known commonly as Braconnier's short skink, is a species of lizard in the family Scincidae. The species is endemic to Madagascar.

== Etymology ==
The specific name, braconnieri is in honor of French naturalist Séraphin Braconnier (1812–1884).

== Geographic range ==
P. bracconieri is found in southwestern Madagascar.

== Habitat ==
The preferred natural habitat of P. braconnieri is sandy soil in both the supralittoral zone and forest, at altitudes of 15–80 m (49–262 ft).

== Description ==
P. braconnieri has no front legs, and the back legs are very small and styliform. It has no visible ear openings.
