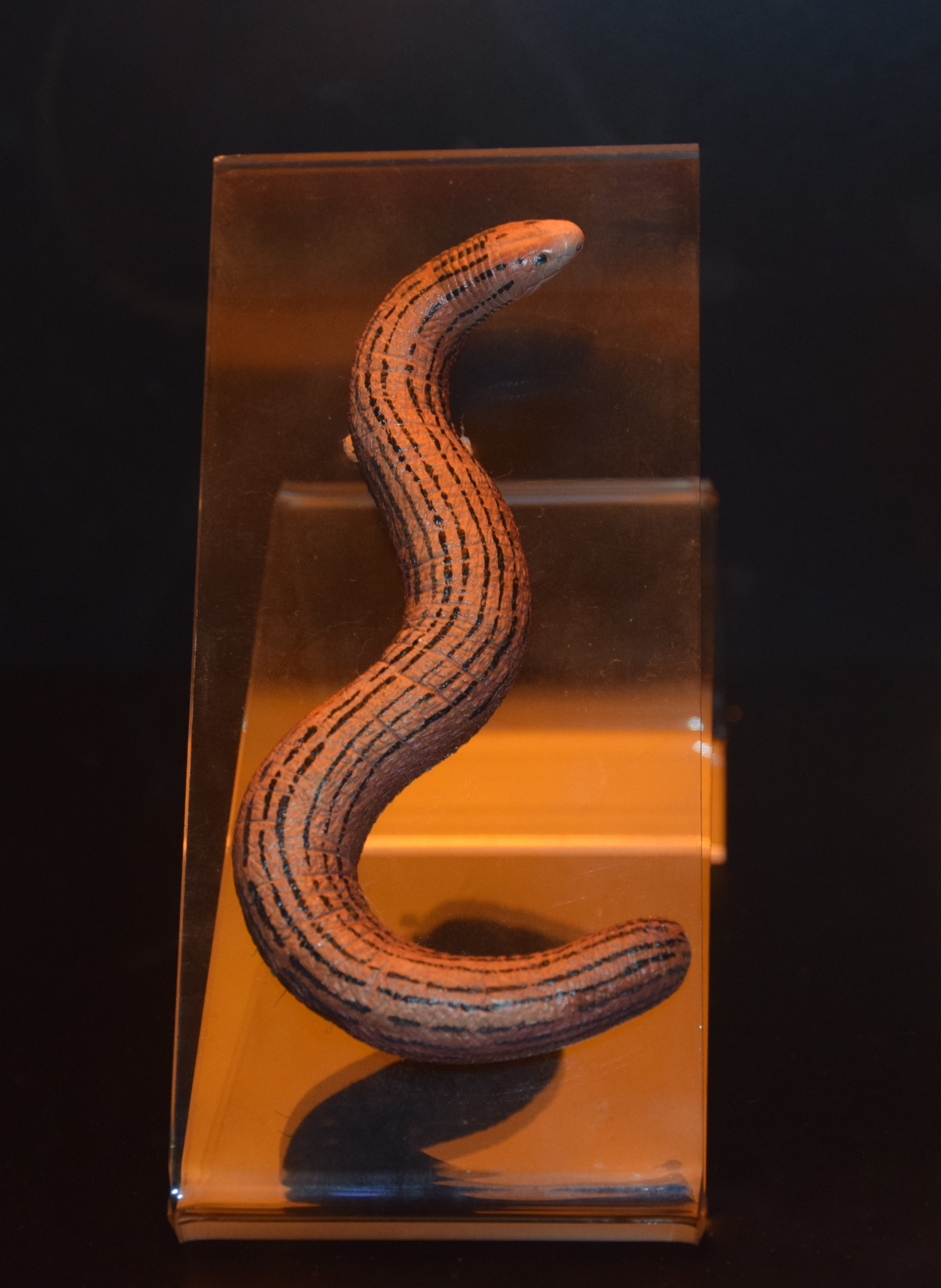

Conservation status
- Critically Endangered (IUCN 3.1)

Scientific classification
- Kingdom: Animalia
- Phylum: Chordata
- Class: Reptilia
- Order: Squamata
- Suborder: Scinciformata
- Infraorder: Scincomorpha
- Family: Scincidae
- Genus: Pseudoacontias
- Species: P. menamainty

Binomial name
- Pseudoacontias menamainty Andreone & Greer, 2002

= Pseudoacontias menamainty =

Species of reptile

Pseudoacontias menamainty is a species of lizard which is endemic to Madagascar.
