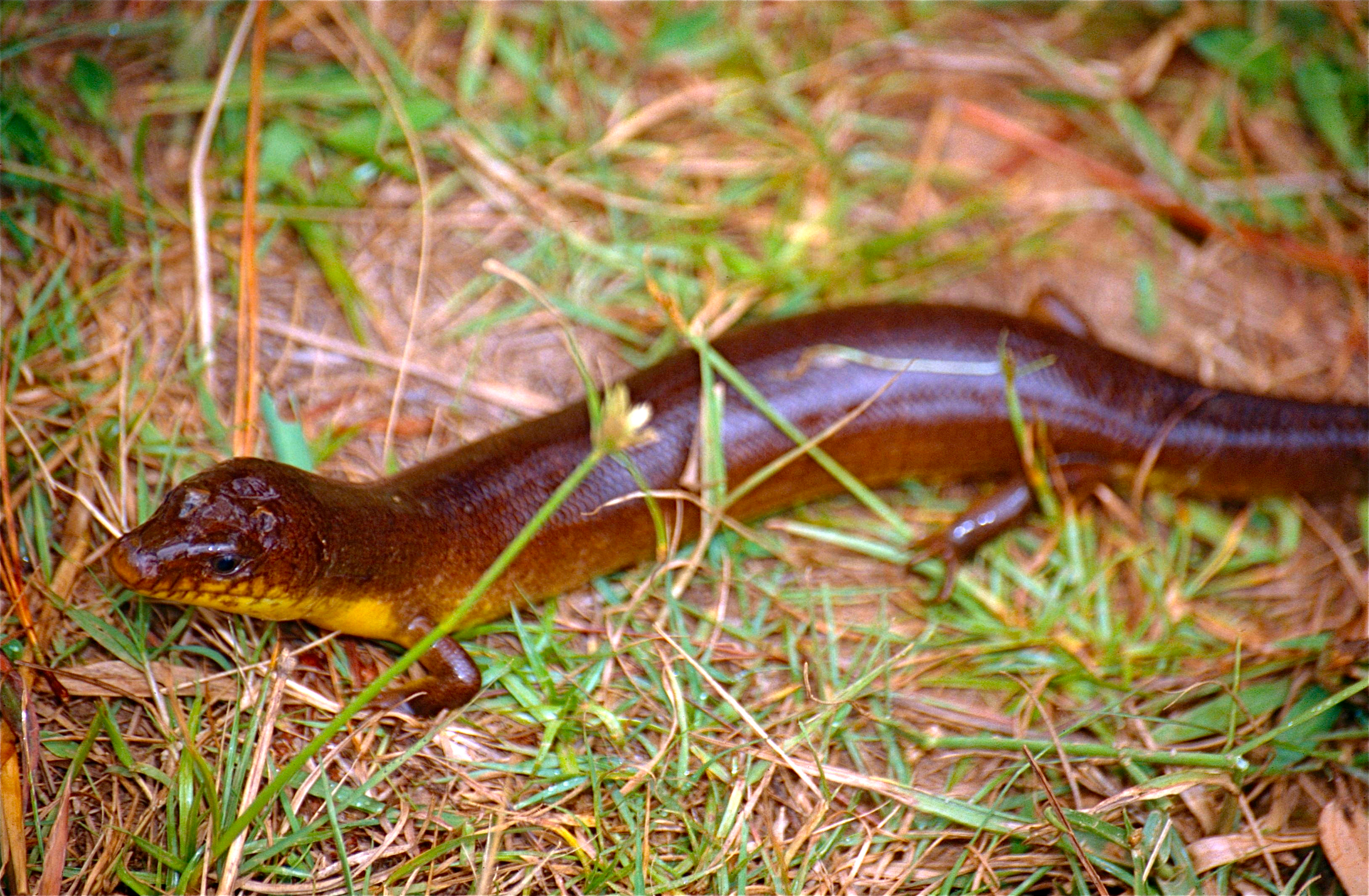

Conservation status
- Least Concern (IUCN 3.1)

Scientific classification
- Kingdom: Animalia
- Phylum: Chordata
- Class: Reptilia
- Order: Squamata
- Family: Scincidae
- Genus: Amphiglossus
- Species: A. astrolabi

Binomial name
- Amphiglossus astrolabi Duméril & Bibron, 1839

= Amphiglossus astrolabi =

Diving skink

Species of lizard

Amphiglossus astrolabi, the diving skink, is a species of skink. It is endemic to Madagascar.
