= Proscelotes aenea =

Conservation status
- Data Deficient (IUCN 3.1)

Scientific classification
- Kingdom: Animalia
- Phylum: Chordata
- Order: Squamata
- Family: Scincidae
- Genus: Proscelotes
- Species: P. aenea

Binomial name
- Proscelotes aenea (Barbour & Loveridge, 1928)
- Proscelotes aenea is only known from near Lumbo, Mozambique

Synonyms
- Scelotes aeneus Barbour & Loveridge, 1928

Species of reptile

Proscelotes aenea, also known as the montane skink, is a species of lizard. It is endemic to Mozambique. Unrecorded for over a century, it was rediscovered near Lumbo in 2021 after scientists determined its type locality.
