= Prasinohaema semoni =

Conservation status
- Least Concern (IUCN 3.1)

Scientific classification
- Kingdom: Animalia
- Phylum: Chordata
- Class: Reptilia
- Order: Squamata
- Suborder: Scinciformata
- Infraorder: Scincomorpha
- Family: Sphenomorphidae
- Genus: Prasinohaema
- Species: P. semoni

Binomial name
- Prasinohaema semoni (Oudemans, 1894)

Species of lizard

Prasinohaema semoni, Semon's green tree skink, is a species of skink found in New Guinea.
