= Proscelotes arnoldi =

Scientific classification
- Kingdom: Animalia
- Phylum: Chordata
- Class: Reptilia
- Order: Squamata
- Family: Scincidae
- Genus: Proscelotes
- Species: P. arnoldi

Binomial name
- Proscelotes arnoldi (Hewitt, 1932)

Synonyms
- Sepsina arnoldi Hewitt, 1932; Scelotes arnoldi — Broadley, 1962; Proscelotes arnoldi — Greer, 1970

Species of lizard

Proscelotes arnoldi, also known commonly as Arnold's skink or Arnold's montane skink, is a species of lizard in the family Scincidae. The species is endemic to Africa. Sometimes called a legless skink, it has tiny reduced limbs. The front limbs are very small, and both fore-limbs and hind-limbs have reduced function and appear to be vestigial attachments for its lifestyle and habitat.

== Etymology ==
The specific name, arnoldi, is in honor of entomologist George Arnold (1881-1962) of the National Museum in Bulawayo, Zimbabwe.

== Description ==
P. arnoldi is a small, slender skink, with a snout-to-vent length (SVL) of 6–8 cm (2.4–3.1 in), and a diameter up to 1–2 cm (0.39–0.79 in), with a short body compared to the long, comparatively thick tail. Its body is brown, but each scale has a dark metallic central spot so it has a shiny appearance. The belly is pale pink in juveniles to salmon-orange in adults.

== Geographic range and behaviour ==
Arnold's skink is found in the Eastern Highlands of Zimbabwe in grasslands and forest and particularly the margins between habitats (like stream banks). This small skink lives in tussock or hamper type mountain grass and moss-beds hiding under stones and logs. It is not easily seen, but it's relatively easy to catch.

== Reproduction ==
P. arnoldii may lay eggs or give birth to live young. Some females have been found containing 4-5 eggs, while others have been found containing 5-6 embryos.
