= Americanist =

An Americanist studies the Americas, American culture, or American language. It may refer to:

== Americas ==
- A linguist specializing in the indigenous languages of the Americas
  - Americanist phonetic notation
- International Congress of Americanists
- Society of Early Americanists

== United States ==
- A scholar specializing in American studies
- A scholar specializing in politics of the United States

== See also ==
- Americanism (disambiguation)
