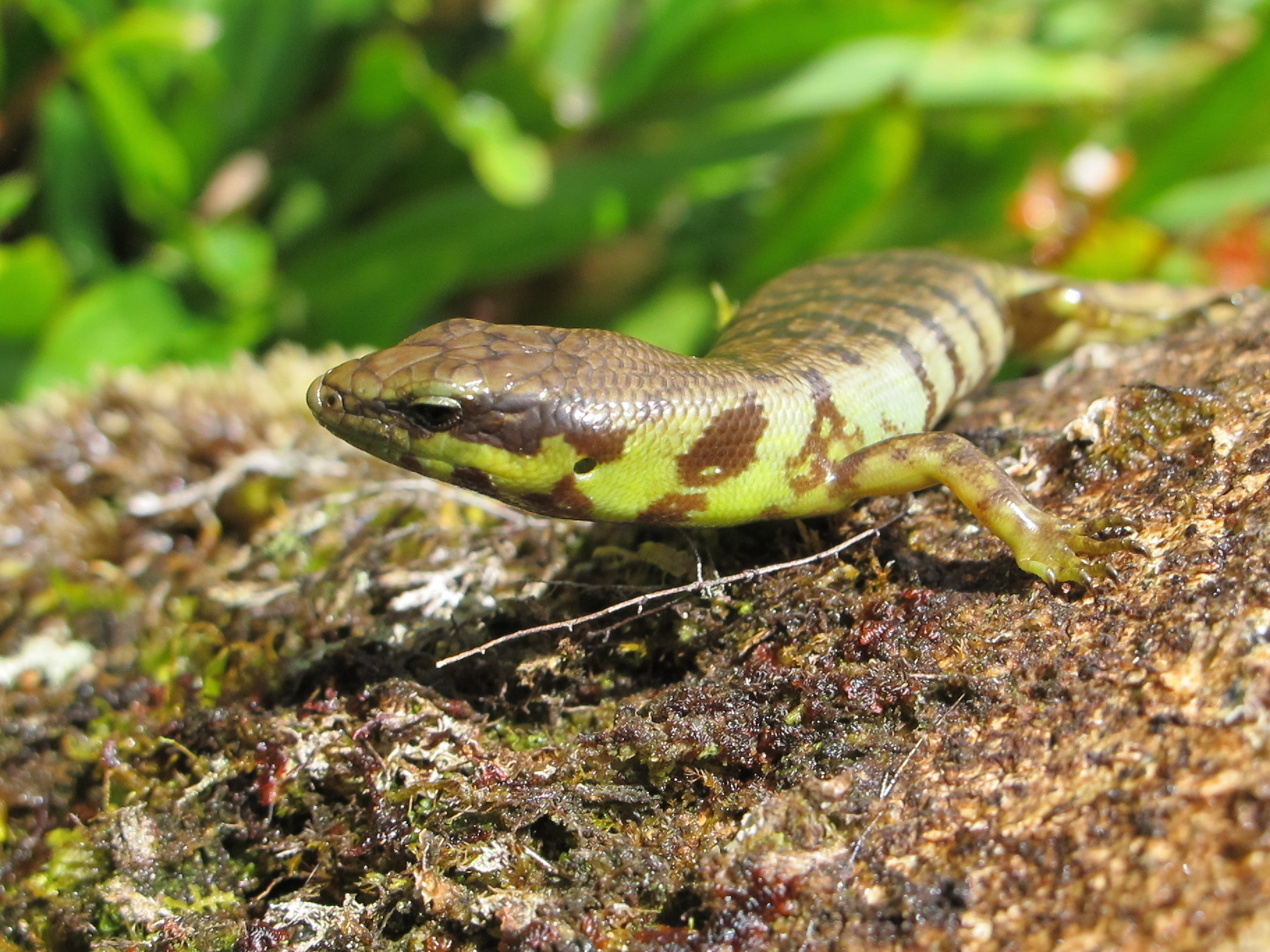

Conservation status
- Least Concern (IUCN 3.1)

Scientific classification
- Kingdom: Animalia
- Phylum: Chordata
- Class: Reptilia
- Order: Squamata
- Suborder: Scinciformata
- Infraorder: Scincomorpha
- Family: Sphenomorphidae
- Genus: Prasinohaema
- Species: P. flavipes

Binomial name
- Prasinohaema flavipes (Parker, 1936)

= Prasinohaema flavipes =

Species of lizard

Papuascincus flavipes, also known as the common green tree skink, is a species of skink found in Papua New Guinea.

== Habitat ==
Papuascincus flavipes is an arboreal species.
