= Pseudoacontias unicolor =

Conservation status
- Vulnerable (IUCN 3.1)

Scientific classification
- Kingdom: Animalia
- Phylum: Chordata
- Class: Reptilia
- Order: Squamata
- Suborder: Scinciformata
- Infraorder: Scincomorpha
- Family: Scincidae
- Genus: Pseudoacontias
- Species: P. unicolor

Binomial name
- Pseudoacontias unicolor Sakata & Hikida, 2003
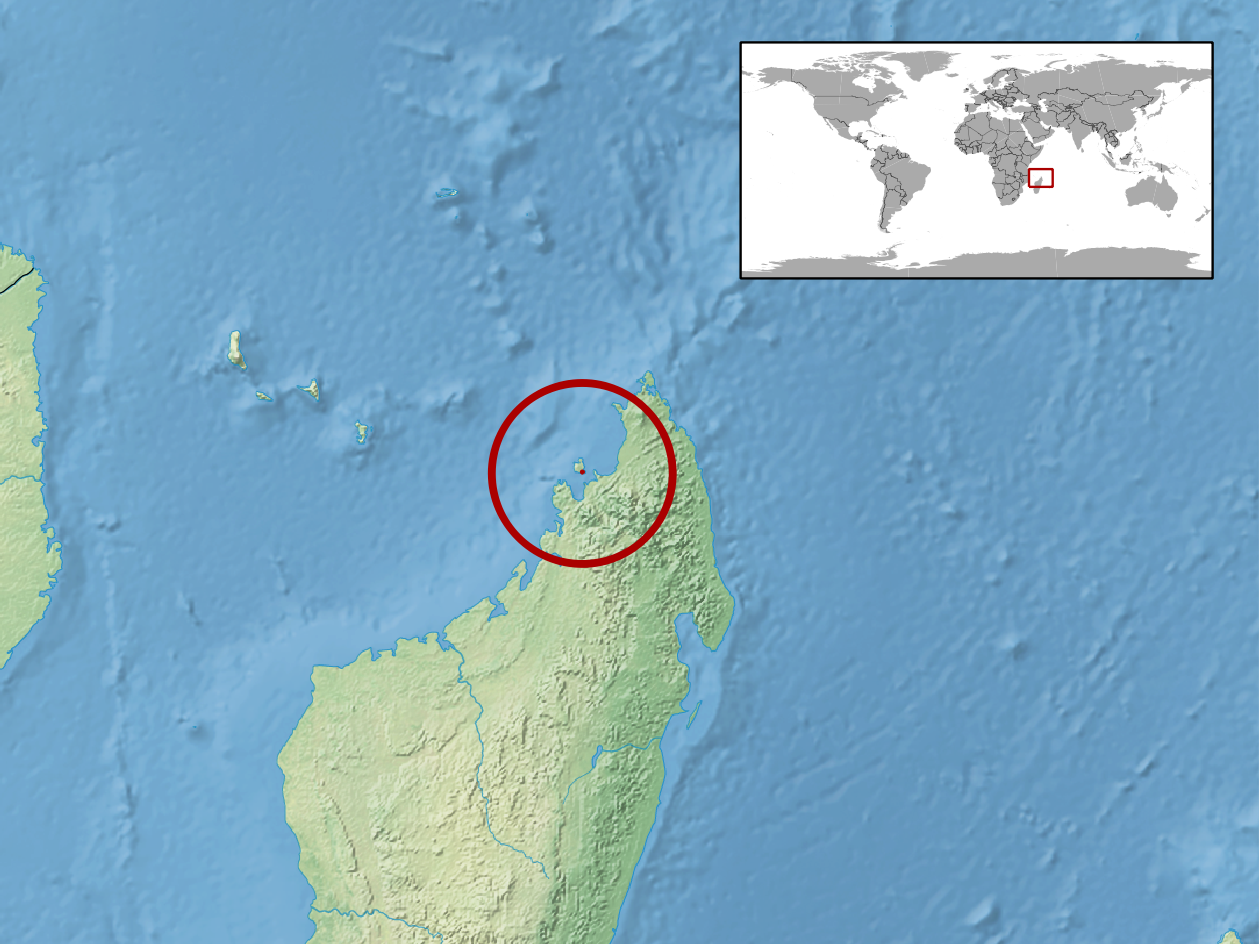

Species of reptile

Pseudoacontias unicolor is a species of lizard which is endemic to Madagascar.
