= Pseudoacontias madagascariensis =

Conservation status
- Data Deficient (IUCN 3.1)

Scientific classification
- Kingdom: Animalia
- Phylum: Chordata
- Class: Reptilia
- Order: Squamata
- Suborder: Scinciformata
- Infraorder: Scincomorpha
- Family: Scincidae
- Genus: Pseudoacontias
- Species: P. madagascariensis

Binomial name
- Pseudoacontias madagascariensis Bocage, 1889

Species of reptile

Pseudoacontias madagascariensis, the giant Madagascar skink, is a species of lizard which is endemic to Madagascar.
