= Americanism =

Americanism may refer to:

- American nationalism
- Any characteristic feature of American English
- Americanism (ideology) sentiments and ideological attachments that some consider distinctly originating as American, and in early 20th-century frequently posited in opposition to communism or anarchism
- Pro-Americanism, love, support, or admiration of the United States by non-Americans
- Americanism (Catholic Church), a group of related beliefs supporting individualism and the separation of church and state that are regarded as heretical by the Catholic Church
- "Americanism", a song by MxPx from their album Teenage Politics

== See also ==
- American exceptionalism
- Americanist (disambiguation)
- Americanization (disambiguation)
- Anti-Americanism
- Comparison of American and British English
- Culture of the United States
- Pan-Americanism
