= Vesey-Fitzgerald =

Vesey-FItzgerald is a surname. Notable people with the surname include:

- Brian Vesey-Fitzgerald (1905–1981), a naturalist
- Desmond Vesey-Fitzgerald (1909–1974), an Irish-born entomologist, conservationist, and plant collector
- Seymour Gonne Vesey-FitzGerald, 1884–1954), British colonial civil servant, barrister, and legal academic
- Seymour Vesey-FitzGerald (1818–1885), Anglo-Irish politician and colonial administrator
- William Vesey-FitzGerald, 2nd Baron FitzGerald and Vesey (1783–1843), Irish statesman, MP for Clare, Newport, Lostwithiel, and Ennis
- William Vesey-FitzGerald (1818–1885), British politician and MP for Horsham, 1848, 1852–1865, 1874–1875
