= Phelsuma parkeri =

Conservation status
- Least Concern (IUCN 3.1)
- CITES Appendix II

Scientific classification
- Kingdom: Animalia
- Phylum: Chordata
- Class: Reptilia
- Order: Squamata
- Suborder: Gekkota
- Family: Gekkonidae
- Genus: Phelsuma
- Species: P. parkeri

Binomial name
- Phelsuma parkeri Loveridge, 1941

Synonyms
- Phelsuma madagascariensis parkeri Loveridge, 1941; Phelsuma parkeri — Mertens, 1963; Phelsuma abbottii parkeri — Broadley & Howell, 1991; Phelsuma parkeri — Kluge, 1993

Species of lizard

Phelsuma parkeri, commonly known as Parker's day gecko and the Pemba Island day gecko, is a diurnal species of lizard in the family Gekkonidae. The species is endemic to Pemba Island, Tanzania, and typically inhabits banana trees and dwellings. The Pemba Island day gecko feeds on insects and nectar.

== Etymology ==
Both the specific name, parkeri, and one of the common names, Parker's day gecko, are in honor of English herpetologist Hampton Wildman Parker.

== Description ==
Parker's day gecko is a slender lizard and a mid-size day gecko. It can reach a total length (including tail) of about 16 cm (6.3 in). The body colour is bright green. A faint red stripe extends from the nostril to the eye. On the back and limbs tiny black spots and speckles are present. This species has yellow eye rings. The ventral side is white.

== Geographic distribution ==
The Pemba Island day gecko is found only on 1,340-square-kilometre (517-square-mile) Pemba Island, which has a few much smaller islands around its coast, and which is 50 km (31 mi) from the Tanzanian mainland.

== Habitat ==
Phelsuma parkeri is often found on different large trees such as banana trees and palms. This species also lives near or on human dwellings.

== Diet ==
Parker's day gecko feeds on various insects and other invertebrates. It also licks soft, sweet fruit, pollen and nectar.

== Behaviour ==
The Pemba Island day gecko is quite shy and stays so, even in captivity.

== Reproduction ==
The females of P. parkeri are colony nesters, and many eggs can be found at one location. The neonates measure about 28 mm (1.1 in).

== Care and maintenance in captivity ==
Parker's day gecko should be housed in pairs. It needs a large, well planted terrarium. The temperature should be about 28 °C (82 °F) during the day. The humidity should be maintained around 65–75% during the day, and slightly higher at night. In captivity, it can be fed crickets, wax moth larvae, fruit flies, mealworms, and houseflies.
