= Prasinohaema parkeri =

Conservation status
- Data Deficient (IUCN 3.1)

Scientific classification
- Kingdom: Animalia
- Phylum: Chordata
- Class: Reptilia
- Order: Squamata
- Family: Scincidae
- Genus: Prasinohaema
- Species: P. parkeri

Binomial name
- Prasinohaema parkeri (M.A. Smith, 1937)

Synonyms
- Lygosoma parkeri M.A. Smith, 1937

Species of lizard

Parker's green tree skink (Prasinohaema parkeri) is a species of lizard in the subfamily Sphenomorphinae of the family Scincidae. The species is endemic to Western New Guinea.

== Etymology ==
The specific name, parkeri, is in honor of English zoologist Hampton Wildman Parker.

== Geographic distribution ==
Prasinohaema parkeri is known only from the Utakwa River, Papua province, Western New Guinea.

== Habitat ==
The preferred natural habitat of Prasinohaema parkeri is forest.

== Behavior ==
Prasinohaema parkeri is arboreal.

== Reproduction ==
The mode of reproduction of Prasinohaema parkeri, is inknown.
