= Red blood =

Red blood may refer to:

- Hematology:
  - Hemoglobin, an iron-based metalloprotein compound and system for transporting oxygen, found in the blood all vertebrates
  - Red blood cell
  - Red blood cell indices
- Red blood python (Python curtus brongersmai)

== See also ==
- Blood red, a shade of colour
- Americanism (disambiguation)
