= Brauer's burrowing skink =

Conservation status
- Endangered (IUCN 3.1)

Scientific classification
- Kingdom: Animalia
- Phylum: Chordata
- Class: Reptilia
- Order: Squamata
- Family: Scincidae
- Genus: Janetaescincus
- Species: J. braueri

Binomial name
- Janetaescincus braueri (Boettger, 1896)
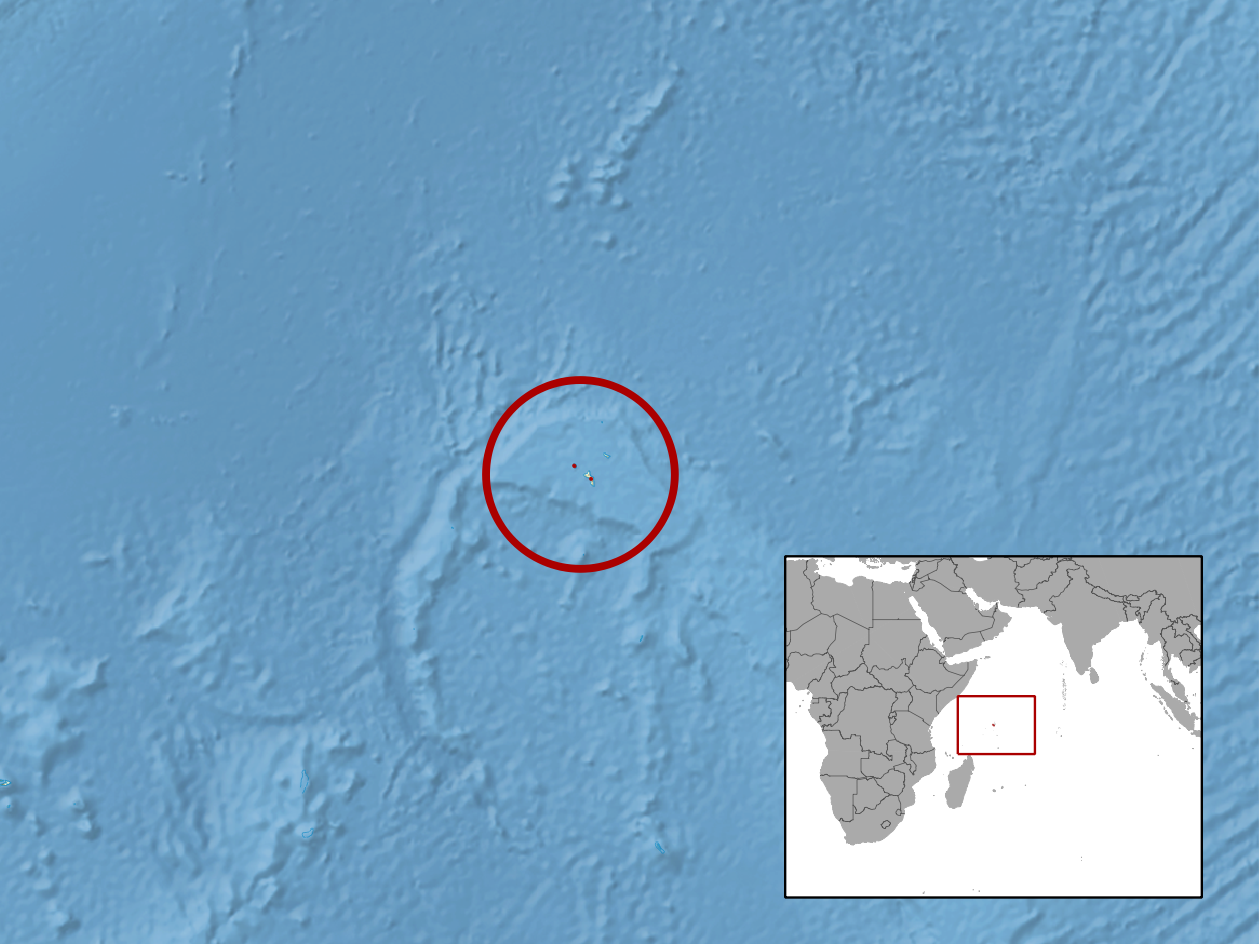

Synonyms
- Scelotes braueri Boettger, 1896; Janetaescincus braueri — Greer, 1970

Species of lizard

Brauer's burrowing skink (Janetaescincus braueri), also known commonly as Brauer's skink, is a species of lizard in the family Scincidae. The species is endemic to the Seychelles.

== Etymology ==
The specific name, braueri, is in honor of German zoologist August Bernhard Brauer.

== Geographic range ==
J. braueri is found only in the Seychelles, where it occurs on the islands Mahé and Silhouette.

== Habitat ==
The natural habitats of Brauer's burrowing skink are subtropical or tropical dry forests and subtropical or tropical moist lowland forests, at altitudes of 200–800 m (660–2,620 ft).

== Reproduction ==
J. braueri is oviparous.

== Conservation status ==
J. braueri is threatened by habitat loss.
