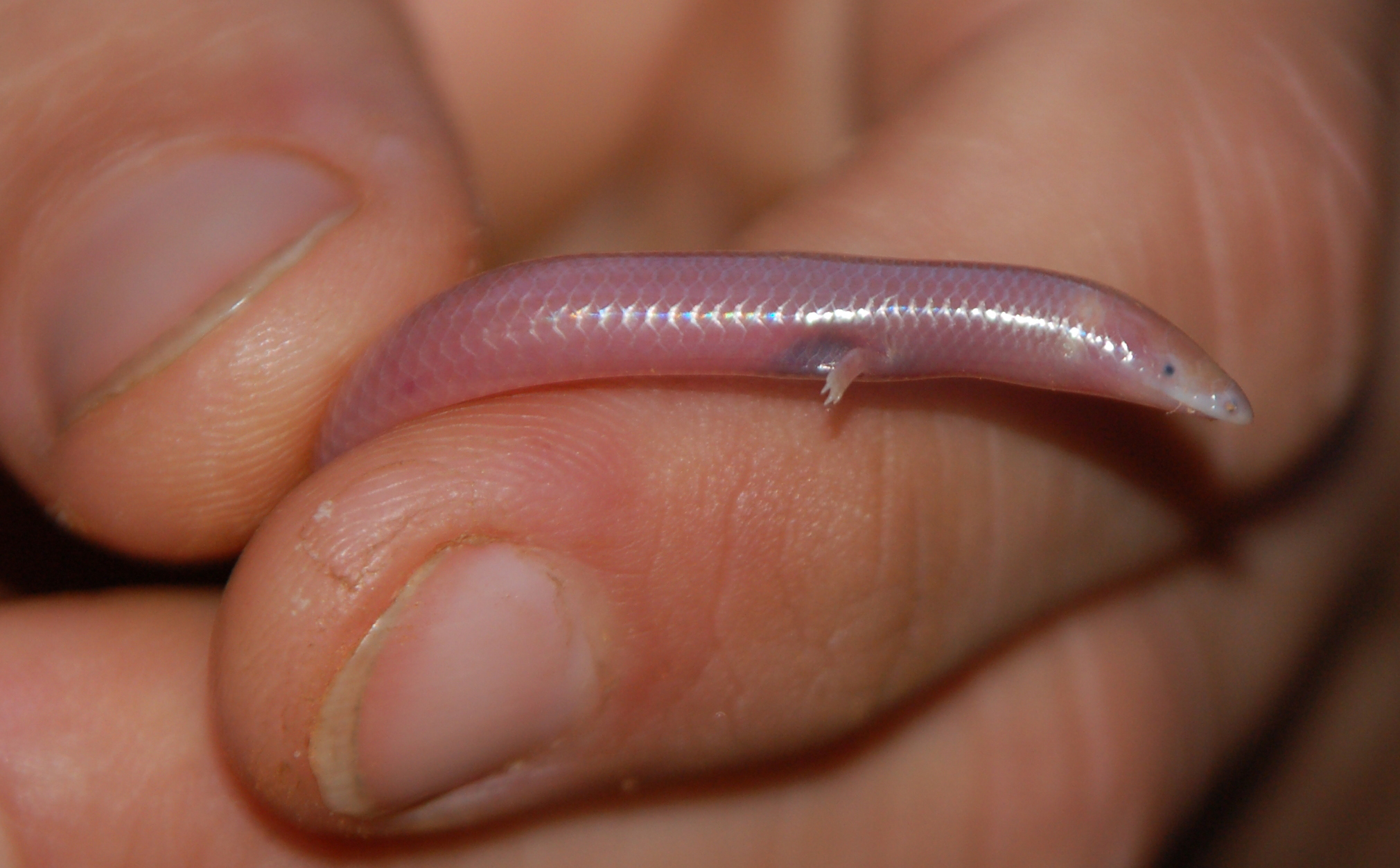

Conservation status
- Endangered (IUCN 3.1)

Scientific classification
- Kingdom: Animalia
- Phylum: Chordata
- Class: Reptilia
- Order: Squamata
- Family: Scincidae
- Genus: Voeltzkowia
- Species: V. yamagishii

Binomial name
- Voeltzkowia yamagishii (Sakata & Hikida, 2003)

Synonyms
- Sirenoscincus yamagishii Sakata & Hikida, 2003

= Voeltzkowia yamagishii =

Species of reptile

Voeltzkowia yamagishii is a species of lizard which is endemic to Madagascar.

== Etymology ==
The specific name, yamagishii, is in honor of Japanese zoologist Satoshi Yamagishi.
