= Pygomeles trivittatus =

Conservation status
- Least Concern (IUCN 3.1)

Scientific classification
- Kingdom: Animalia
- Phylum: Chordata
- Class: Reptilia
- Order: Squamata
- Family: Scincidae
- Genus: Pygomeles
- Species: P. trivittatus

Binomial name
- Pygomeles trivittatus (Boulenger, 1896)
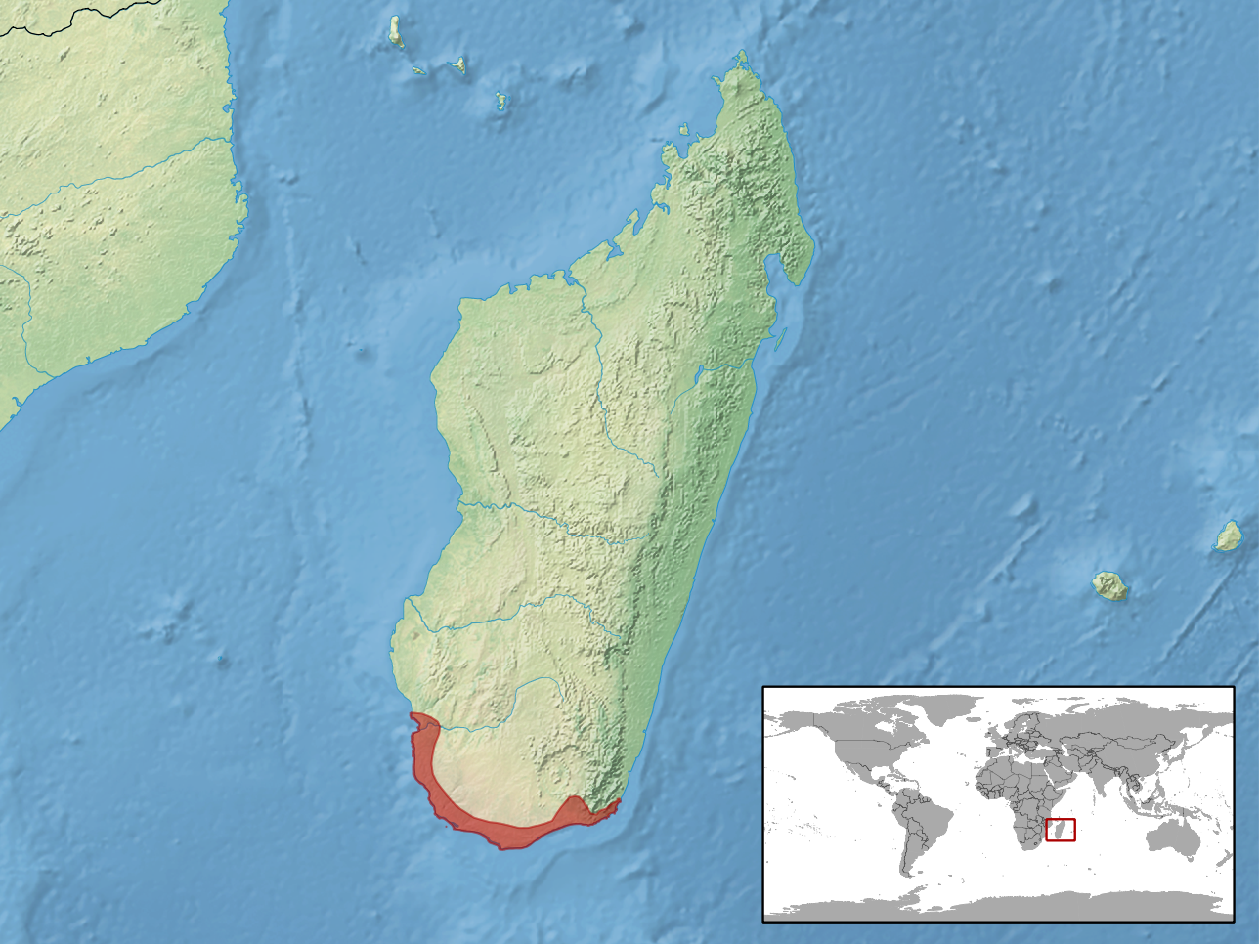

Synonyms
- Scelotes trivittatus Androngo trivittatus

Species of lizard

Pygomeles trivittatus is a skink in the (family Scincidae). It appeared to be nested within the monotypic genus Androngo, but this species more recently was found to be more closely related to Pygomeles.
