= Pygomeles =

Scientific classification
- Kingdom: Animalia
- Phylum: Chordata
- Class: Reptilia
- Order: Squamata
- Family: Scincidae
- Subfamily: Scincinae
- Genus: Pygomeles; Grandidier, 1867
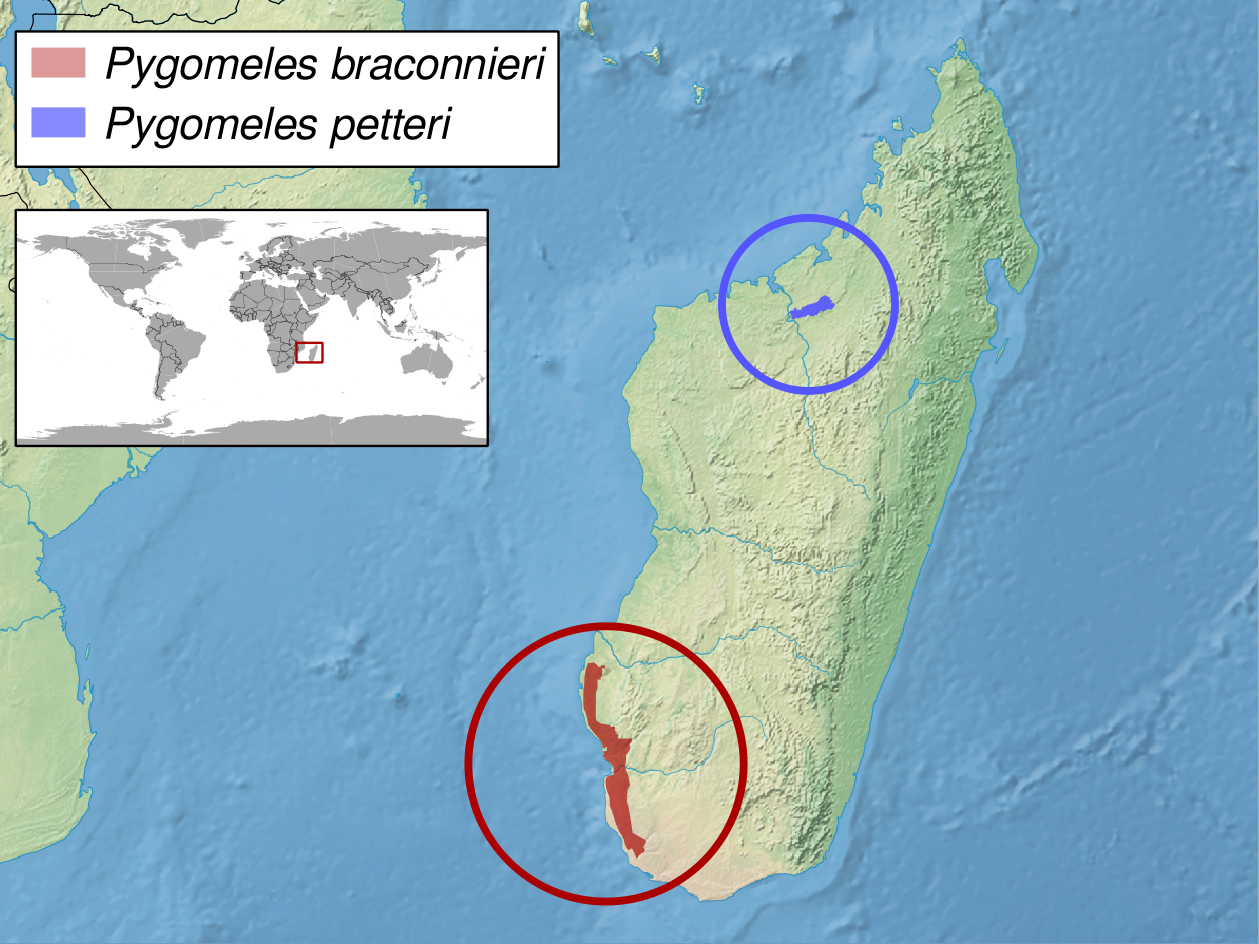

Genus of lizards

Pygomeles is a genus of skinks, lizards in the family Scincidae. The genus is endemic to Madagascar.

== Classification ==
There are three species that are recognized as being valid.

- Pygomeles braconnieri Grandidier, 1867 – Braconnier's short skink
- Pygomeles petteri G. Pasteur & Paulian, 1962 – Petter's short skink
- Pygomeles trivittatus (Boulenger, 1896)
