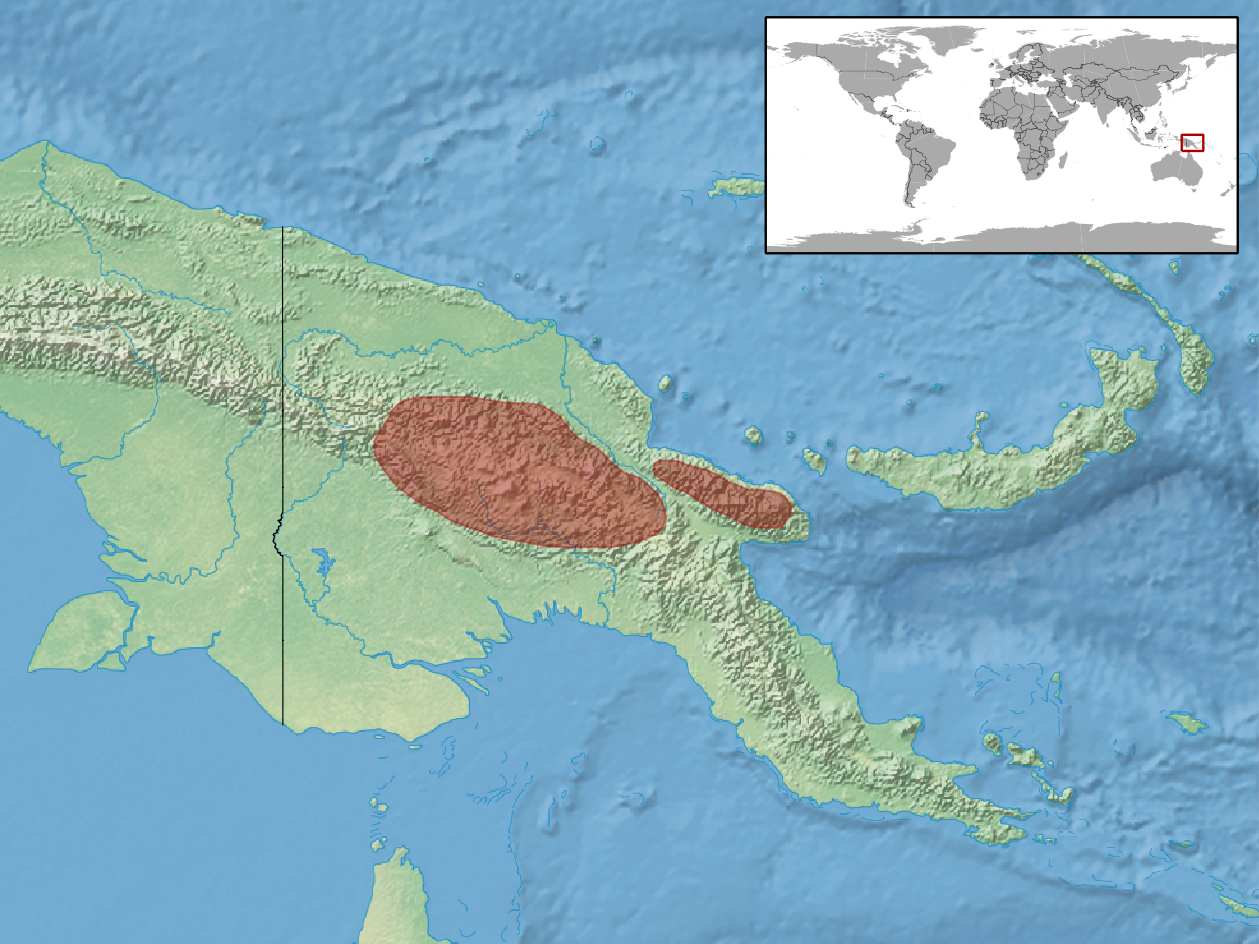
- Geographic distribution of Prasinohaema flavipes

Scientific classification
- Kingdom: Animalia
- Phylum: Chordata
- Class: Reptilia
- Order: Squamata
- Family: Scincidae
- Subfamily: Sphenomorphinae
- Genus: Prasinohaema; Greer, 1974

= Prasinohaema =

Genus of lizards

Prasinohaema (Greek: "green blood") is a genus of lizards in the subfamily Sphenomorphinae of the family Scincidae (skinks). Species in the genus Prasinohaema are characterized by having green blood. This condition is caused by an excess buildup of the bile pigment biliverdin. Prasinohaema species have plasma biliverdin concentrations approximately 1.5–30 times greater than fish species with green blood plasma, and 40 times greater than humans with green jaundice. The benefit provided by the high pigment concentration is unknown, but one possibility is that it protects against malaria.

== Geographic range ==
Species in the genus Prasinohaema are endemic to New Guinea and the Solomon Islands.

== Species ==
Species in the genus include:

- Prasinohaema flavipes (Parker, 1936) – common green tree skink
- Prasinohaema parkeri (M.A. Smith, 1937) – Parker's green tree skink
- Prasinohaema prehensicauda (Loveridge, 1945) – prehensile green tree skink
- Prasinohaema semoni (Oudemans, 1894) – Semon's green tree skink
- Prasinohaema virens (W. Peters, 1881) - green-blooded skink, green tree skink

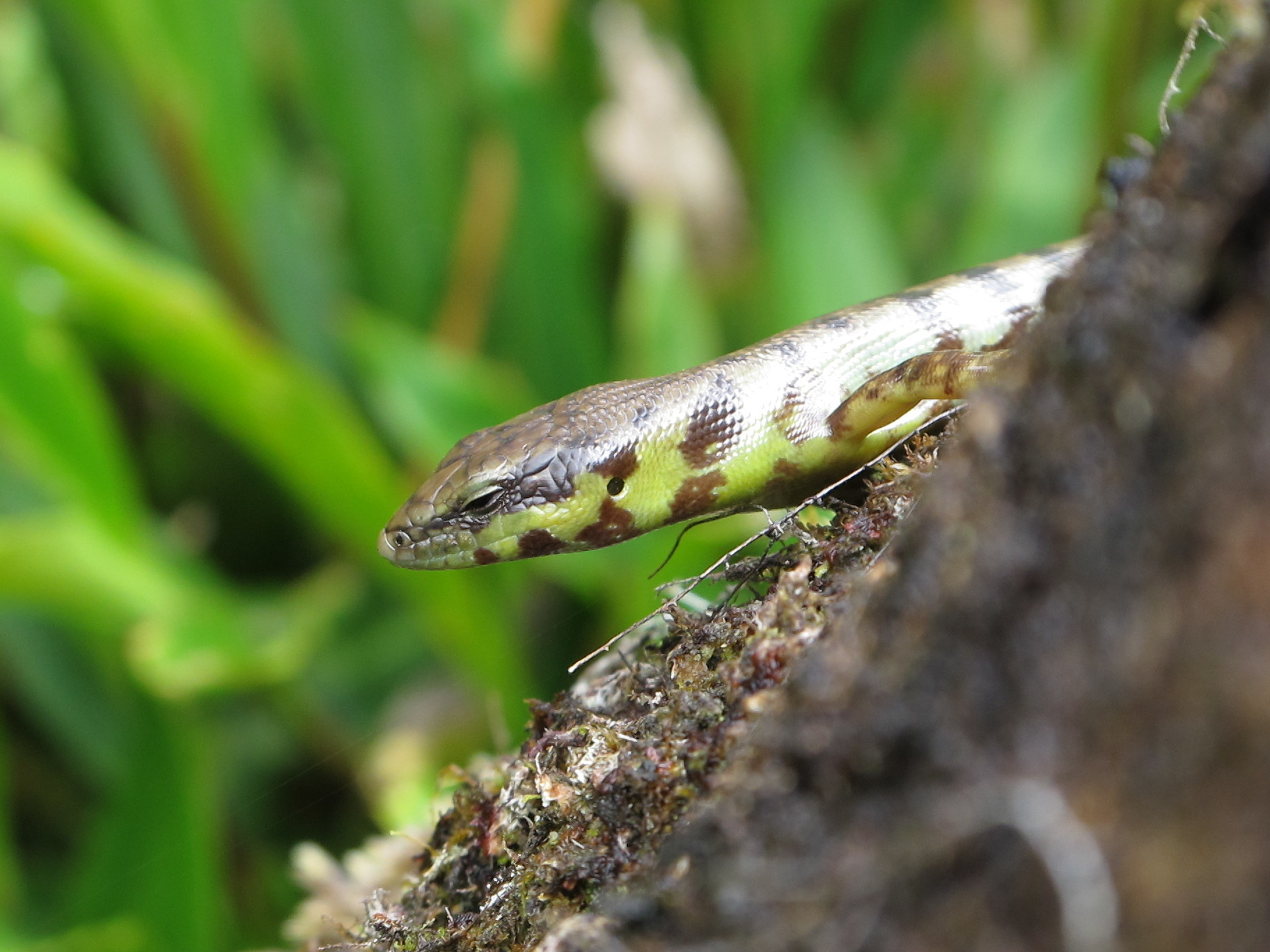

Nota bene: A binomial authority in parentheses indicates that the species was originally described in a genus other than Prasinohaema.

== Etymology ==
The specific names, parkeri and semoni, are in honor of English herpetologist Hampton Wildman Parker and German zoologist Richard Wolfgang Semon, respectively.
