= Pseudoacontias =

Scientific classification
- Kingdom: Animalia
- Phylum: Chordata
- Class: Reptilia
- Order: Squamata
- Family: Scincidae
- Subfamily: Scincinae
- Genus: Pseudoacontias; Bocage, 1889

Type species
- Pseudoacontias madagascariensis Bocage, 1889

Genus of lizards

Pseudoacontias is genus of skinks, lizards in the family Scincidae.

== Geographic range ==
The genus Pseudoacontias is endemic to Madagascar.

== Description ==
All species of Pseudoacontias are large, fossorial skinks, measuring at least 200 mm (7.9 in) in snout–vent length. They lack limbs or have greatly reduced limbs.

== Species ==
The genus contains the following species:

- Pseudoacontias angelorum Raxworthy & Nussbaum, 1995
- Pseudoacontias madagascariensis Bocage, 1889 – giant Madagascar skink
- Pseudoacontias menamainty Andreone & Greer, 2002
- Pseudoacontias unicolor Sakata & Hikida, 2003

== Etymology ==
The specific name, angelorum (genitive, masculine, plural), is in honor of twin brothers Angelien and Angeluc Razafimanantsoa who are Madagascan naturalists.
