= Vesey-Fitzgerald's burrowing skink =

Conservation status
- Endangered (IUCN 3.1)

Scientific classification
- Kingdom: Animalia
- Phylum: Chordata
- Class: Reptilia
- Order: Squamata
- Family: Scincidae
- Genus: Janetaescincus
- Species: J. veseyfitzgeraldi

Binomial name
- Janetaescincus veseyfitzgeraldi (Parker, 1947)
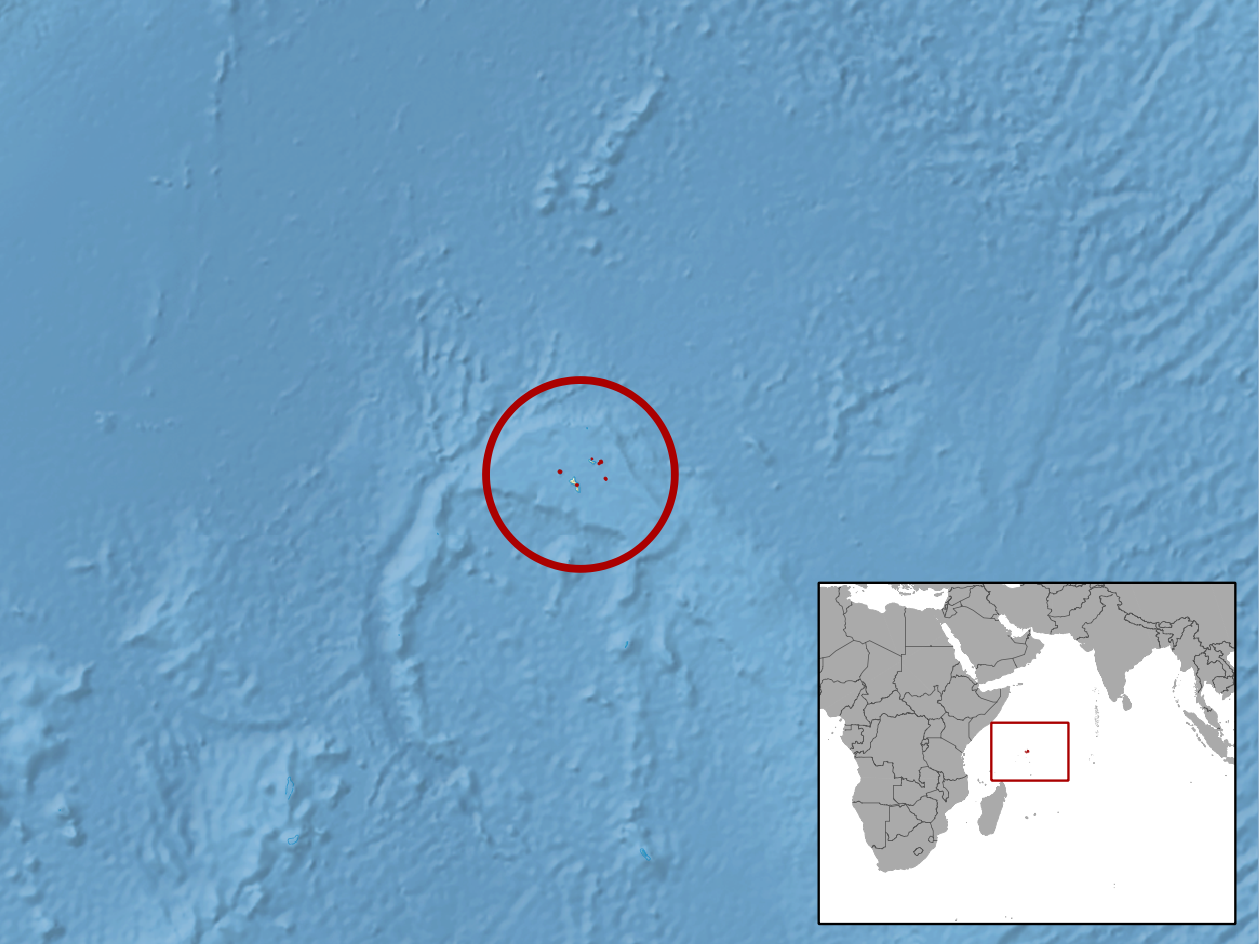

Synonyms
- Amphiglossus veseyfitzgeraldi Parker, 1947; Janetaescincus veseyfitzgeraldi — Greer, 1970; Scelotes veseyfitzgeraldi — Henkel & W. Schmidt, 2000; Janetaescincus veseyfitzgeraldi — Austin et al., 2009

Species of lizard

Vesey-Fitzgerald's burrowing skink (Janetaescincus veseyfitzgeraldi) is a species of lizard in the family Scincidae. The species is endemic to the Seychelles.

== Etymology ==
The specific epithet, veseyfitzgeraldi, commemorates the Irish ecologist Leslie Desmond Edward Foster Vesey-Fitzgerald.

== Geographic range ==
J. veseyfitzgeraldi is found only in the Seychelles.

== Habitat ==
The natural habitat of J. veseyfitzgeraldi is tropical moist lowland forests.

== Conservation status ==
J. veseyfitzgeraldi is threatened by habitat loss.
