= Prasinohaema prehensicauda =

Conservation status
- Least Concern (IUCN 3.1)

Scientific classification
- Kingdom: Animalia
- Phylum: Chordata
- Class: Reptilia
- Order: Squamata
- Family: Scincidae
- Genus: Prasinohaema
- Species: P. prehensicauda

Binomial name
- Prasinohaema prehensicauda (Loveridge, 1945)

Species of lizard

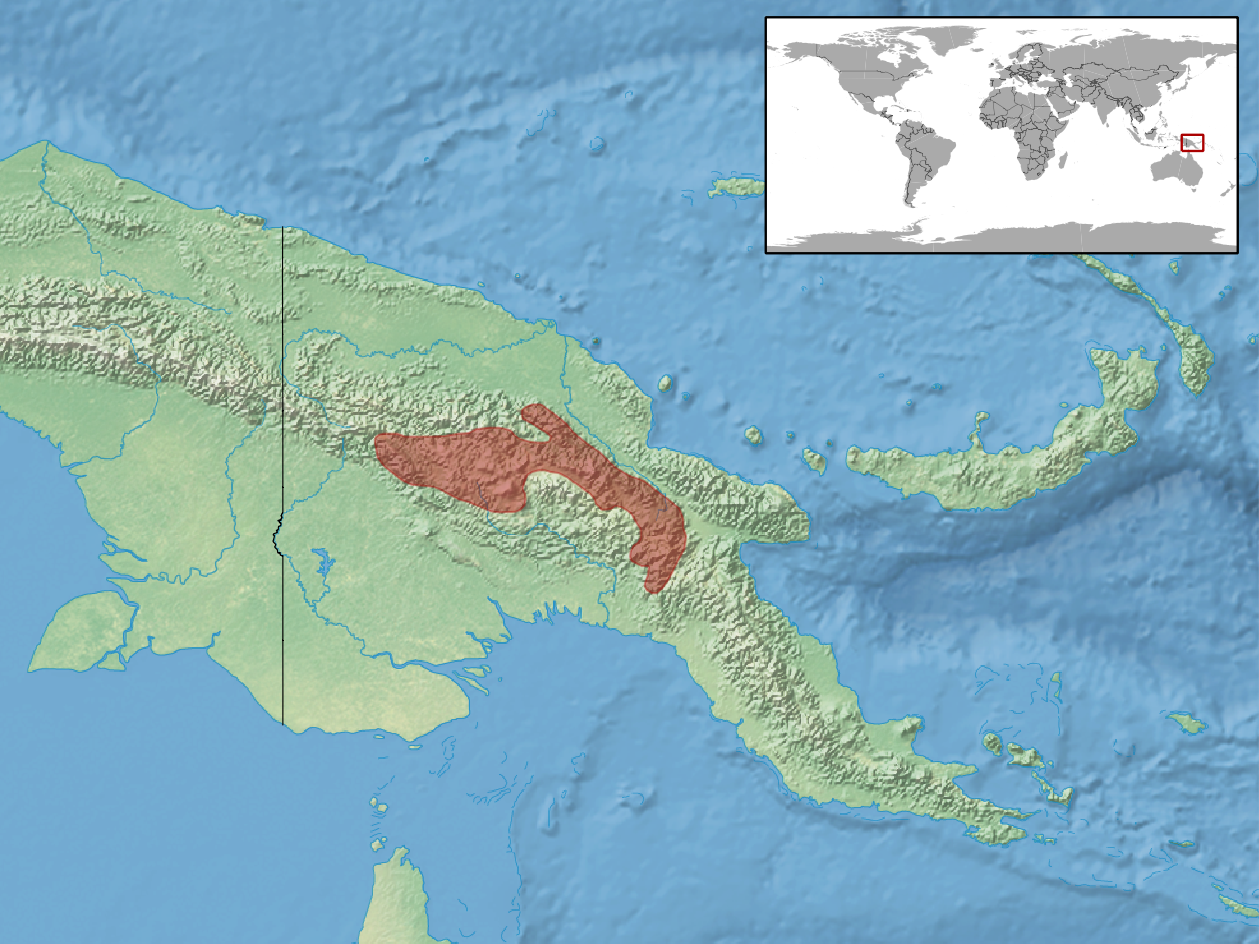
Geographic distribution of Prasinohaema prehensicauda

Prasinohaema prehensicauda, the prehensile green tree skink, is a species of skink. It is found in Papua New Guinea.

== Names ==
It is known as sydn in the Kalam language of Papua New Guinea. Green P. prehensicauda are called sydn km, while brown ones are called sydn mlep.

== Habitat ==
It is an arboreal skink found in casuarinas and other second-growth trees.
