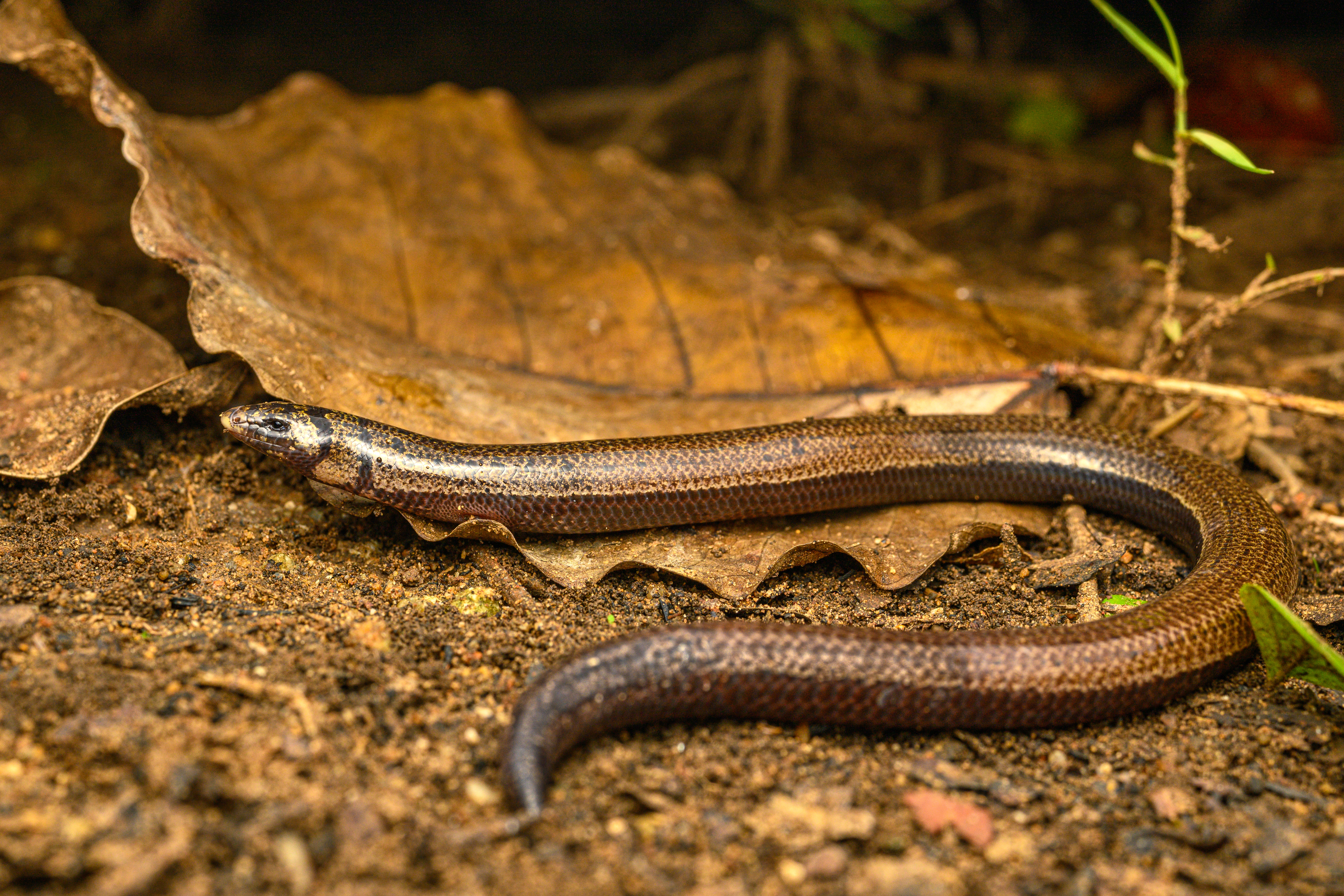
- Jarujinia bipedalis from Sai Yok District, Kanchanaburi Province

Conservation status
- Least Concern (IUCN 3.1)

Scientific classification
- Kingdom: Animalia
- Phylum: Chordata
- Class: Reptilia
- Order: Squamata
- Family: Scincidae
- Genus: Jarujinia; Chan-ard, Makchai & Cota, 2011
- Species: J. bipedalis

Binomial name
- Jarujinia bipedalis Chan-ard, Makchai & Cota, 2011

= Jarujinia =

Genus of lizards

Jarujinia is a genus of skinks. It contains one species, Jarujinia bipedalis, which is endemic to central Thailand.
