= Voeltzkowia =

Scientific classification
- Kingdom: Animalia
- Phylum: Chordata
- Class: Reptilia
- Order: Squamata
- Family: Scincidae
- Subfamily: Scincinae
- Genus: Voeltzkowia; Boettger, 1893

Species
- See text
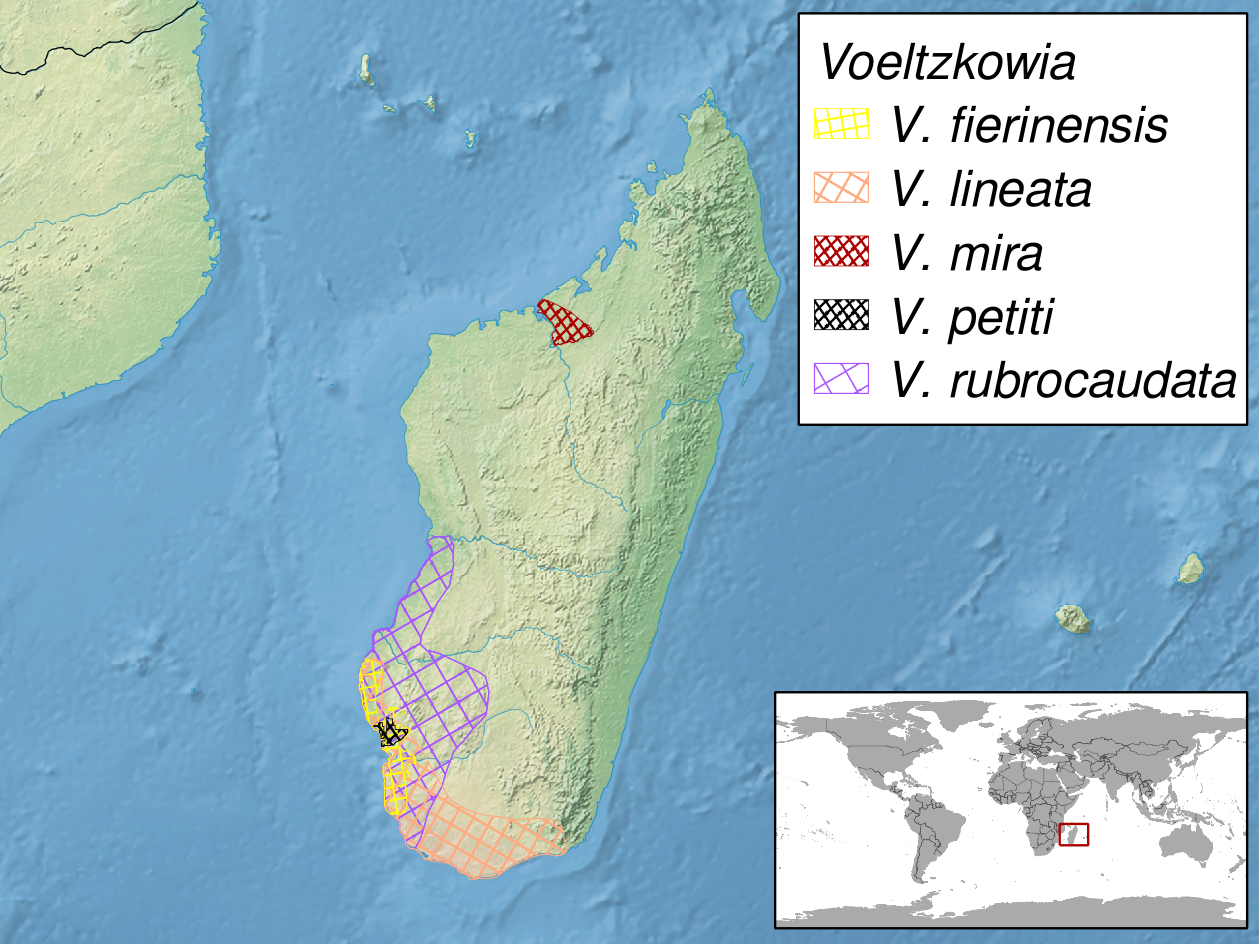
- Geographic ranges of some species of Voeltzkowia (sensu lato) on the island of Madagascar.

Synonyms
- Sirenoscincus Sakata & Hikida, 2003

Genus of lizards

Voeltzkowia is a genus of skinks.

== Geographic range ==
The genus Voeltzkowia is endemic to Madagascar.

== Species ==
Three species are recognized as being valid.

- Voeltzkowia mira Boettger, 1893
- Voeltzkowia mobydick (Miralles et al., 2012)
- Voeltzkowia yamagishii (Sakata & Hikida, 2003)

Nota bene: A binomial authority in parentheses indicates that the species was originally described in a genus other than Voeltzkowia.

The species V. mobydick and V. yamagishii were formerly in the genus Sirenoscincus.

The species formerly known as Voeltzkowia fierinensis, V. lineata, V. petiti, and V. rubrocaudata have been assigned to the genus Grandidierina.

End of 2025, a study published in Zoological Journal on Linnean Society, announces the discovery of two new species :

- Voeltzkowia volontany,
- Voeltzkowia shai-hulud.

== Etymology ==
The generic name, Voeltzkowia, is in honor of German biologist Alfred Voeltzkow.
