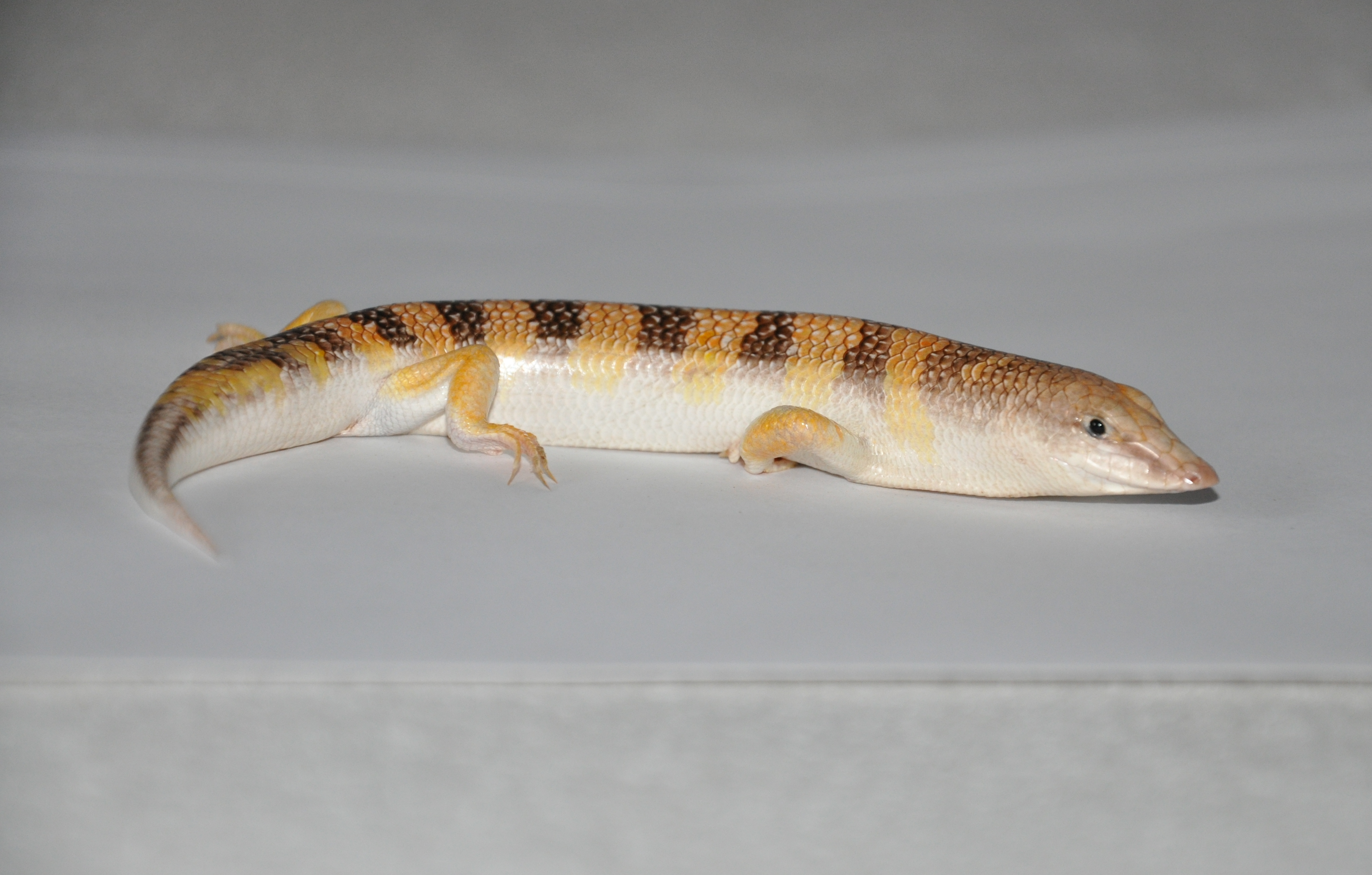
- Scincus scincus male

Scientific classification
- Kingdom: Animalia
- Phylum: Chordata
- Class: Reptilia
- Order: Squamata
- Family: Scincidae
- Subfamily: Scincinae; Gray, 1825

= Scincinae =

Subfamily of lizards

Scincinae is a subfamily of lizards, commonly called skinks. The systematics is at times controversial. The group may be paraphyletic. It is one of seven subfamilies of the family Scincidae, the other six being Acontinae, Egerniinae, Eugongylinae, Lygosominae, Mabuyinae, and Sphenomorphinae.

== Genera ==
The subfamily Scincinae contains the following 36 genera, of which seven are monotypic.

- Amphiglossus A.M.C. Duméril & Bibron, 1839 (2 species)
- Ateuchosaurus Gray, 1845 (2 species)
- Barkudia Annandale, 1917 (2 species)
- Brachymeles A.M.C. Duméril & Bibron, 1839 (42 species)
- Brachyseps Erens, Miralles, Glaw, Chatrou & Vences, 2016 (8 species)
- Chalcides Laurenti, 1768 (32 species)
- Chalcidoceps Boulenger, 1887 (monotypic)
- Eumeces Wiegmann, 1834 (6 species)
- Eurylepis Blyth, 1854 (2 species)
- Feylinia Gray, 1845 (6 species)
- Flexiseps Erens, Miralles, Glaw, Chatrou & Vences, 2016 (15 species)
- Gongylomorphus Fitzinger, 1843 (3 species)
- Grandidierina Mocquard, 1894 (4 species)
- Hakaria Steindachner, 1899 (monotypic)
- Janetaescincus Greer, 1970 (2 species)
- Jarujinia Chan-ard, Makchai & Cota, 2011 (monotypic)
- Madascincus Brygoo, 1982 (12 species)
- Melanoseps Boulenger, 1887 (8 species)
- Mesoscincus Griffith, Ngo & Murphy, 2000 (3 species)
- Nessia Gray, 1839 (9 species)
- Ophiomorus A.M.C. Duméril & Bibron, 1839 (12 species)
- Pamelaescincus Greer, 1970 (monotypic)
- Paracontias Mocquard, 1894 (14 species)
- Plestiodon A.M.C. Duméril & Bibron, 1839 (50 species)
- Proscelotes de Witte & Laurent, 1943 (3 species)
- Pseudoacontias Bocage, 1889 (4 species)
- Pygomeles Grandidier, 1867 (3 species)
- Scelotes Fitzinger, 1826 (22 species)
- Scincopus W. Peters, 1864 (monotypic)
- Scincus Laurenti, 1768 (5 species)
- Scolecoseps Loveridge, 1920 (4 species)
- Sepsina Bocage, 1866 (5 species)
- Sepsophis Beddome, 1870 (monotypic)
- Typhlacontias Bocage, 1873 (7 species)
- Voeltzkowia Boettger, 1893 (3 species)
- Zig Miralles et al., 2026 (monotypic)
