= Americanization (disambiguation) =

Americanization refers to the influence the United States of America has on the culture of other countries.

Americanization may also refer to:

- Americanization (immigration), the process of assimilation of foreign immigrants into the US
- Americanization (foreign culture and media), the modification of foreign media to suit American tastes
- Cultural assimilation of Native Americans, the attempted assimilation of Native American cultures as a policy of the US government c. 1850 – c. 1920
- Americanization (Vietnam War), a time period in the Vietnam War, roughly the years of President Lyndon B. Johnson
