= Walter Kaudern =

Swedish zoologist (1881–1942)

- Portrait of Walter Kaudern taken by his brother Axel Kaudern february 1941.
- Born: 24 March 1881; Stockholm
- Died: 16 July 1942 (aged 61)
- Alma mater: Stockholm University
- Occupation: Ethnographer; painter; photographer
- Academic career
- Institutions: Gothenburg Museum

Trip to Sainte Marie de Marovoay in 1906 during Walter Kauderns first visit to Madagascar.

Walter Alexander Kaudern (March 24, 1881 – July 16, 1942) was a Swedish zoologist and ethnographer. He made research trips to Madagascar and Sulawesi.

Kaudern became a Doctor of Philosophy in 1910 and in 1933 he succeeded Erland Nordenskiöld as the director of the Ethnographic collections at the Museum of Gothenburg. From 1906 to 1907 and from 1911 to 1912, he made research trips to Madagascar and 1916–1921 to Dutch India and Sulawesi (Celebes at the time), from where he returned to Sweden with rich zoological, botanical, anthropological and ethnographic collections. In addition to the scientific papers, Kaudern published several books on his travels, På Madagascar (1913) and I Celebes obygder (2 volumes, 1921). Among his ethnographic works Ethnographical studies in Celebes (4 volumes, 1925–1929) are the most known.

== First trip to Madagascar ==
In 1906, Kaudern traveled to the northwest of Madagascar, where he spent 10 months to collect material for his doctoral dissertation on the reproductive organs of insectivorous and half-monkeys. He also collected ethnographic objects and plants. He never wrote a travel story from this trip, but in the book about the subsequent trip he reproduces some episodes from this first trip.

He travelled from Sweden to Durban, South Africa with the boat Baltic. In Madagascar, Kaudern lived with the Swedish consul and entrepreneur Thure Richmann in Majunga. Photographs from this expedition are kept at the Museum of World Culture in Gothenburg and the ethnographic collections are kept at the Museum of Ethnography in Stockholm.

== Second trip to Madagascar ==
With the financial support of, among others, Crown Prince Gustaf Adolf, in 1911, Kaudern once again traveled to Madagascar, now in the company of his wife Teres. This time, too, the trip went to the northwestern part of the island, but they also made a detour to the northeastern part of the island. The son Johan Valter was born in Madagascar in May 1912. In his book "På Madagaskar", Kaudern tells about his time in Madagascar, especially from the time of this second expedition to the island.

In addition to the crown prince, he received financial support from the foundation Lars Hierta's memory, director M. Lindahl and bank manager Fraenckel. Equipment was provided by the Swedish Museum of Natural History and Gustaf Retzius assisted with anthropometric instruments. During the trip they received more financial support from the Royal Swedish Academy of Sciences and Swedish Society for Anthropology and Geography.

On March 24, the Transatlantic's steamer Tasmania left Fredrikstad with destination Durban. Due to problems with the luggage, they remained in Durban for about a month, which they spent with Georg Adlersparre and his wife. In May, they finally came to Madagascar and again, Kaudern was helped with accommodation by Thure Richmann in Majunga. In Tamatave he got to live with Christian Bang. Collections from this expedition are kept at the Museum of World Culture and the Museum of Ethnography, Stockholm.

== Expedition to Celebes ==
In December 1916, Walter Kaudern, with Mrs Teres and the two sons Sven Alexander and Johan Valter, went on an expedition to Celebes (today Sulawesi). The expedition was again financed by Crown Prince Gustaf Adolf and Axel A: son Johnson and it came to last four years until 1921. The purpose was initially zoological, but after meeting with the island's people, Kaudern and Teres mainly devoted themselves to exploring the culture and daily life. Kaudern returned to Sweden with more than 3000 objects, hundreds of photographs, drawings and drawings as well as 15 oil paintings which are today available at the Museum of World Culture in Gothenburg. The scientific results were published in the series Ethnographical studies in Celebes. The zoological material from Sulawesi can be found at the Gothenburg Natural History Museum. During the journey, objects were also collected in Java and the Philippines.

== Museum director ==
During his time as director of the ethnographic collections at the Museum in Gothenburg he founded the periodical Etnologiska studier in 1935. He also took great care in re-arranging and re-creating the exhibitions in the Museum.
