= Hampton Wildman Parker =

English zoologist

Hampton Wildman Parker, CBE (5 July 1897 – 2 September 1968) was an English zoologist.

Parker graduated from Cambridge in 1923 with degrees in botany, zoology, and chemistry. Within the same year, he joined the staff of the British Museum (Natural History Museum) and was later assigned Keeper of Zoology from 1947 to 1957. During his career, he wrote several works on snakes and frogs. Parker also discovered a new species of lizard on the Seychelles, which he described and named Vesey-Fitzgerald's burrowing skink (Janetaescincus veseyfitzgeraldi) after entomologist Leslie Desmond Foster Vesey-Fitzgerald.

== Books by H.W. Parker ==
- (1934). A Monograph of the Frogs of the Family Microhylidae. London: Trustees of the British Museum (Natural History).
- (1963). Snakes. London: Hale.
- (1965). Natural History of Snakes. London: Trustees of the British Museum (Natural History).
- (1977). Snakes, a Natural History. Brisbane: University of Queensland Press.

== Eponyms ==
Parker is honored in the specific names of the following reptiles: Cercosaura parkeri, Chamaelycus parkeri, Emoia parkeri, Myriopholis parkeri, Phelsuma parkeri, Prasinohaema parkeri, Sphaerodactylus parkeri, Tropidonophis parkeri, Tropidophis parkeri, and Zonurus parkeri (a synonym of Cordylus tropidosternum).
