= Desmond Vesey-Fitzgerald =

Irish entomologist and ornithologist

Leslie Desmond Edward Foster-Vesey-Fitzgerald MBE (7 June 1909-3/4 May 1974), was an Irish-born entomologist, ornithologist, conservationist, and plant collector.

== Life and education ==
Leslie Desmond Edward Foster-Vesey-Fitzgerald was born on 7 June 1909 in Dunleer, County Louth, Ireland. His parents were John Joseph Leslie Foster-Vesey-Fitzgerald and Mary Edith (née Glennie). In 1930, Vesey-Fitzgerald graduated to Bachelor of Science at the Wye Agricultural College of the London University. In 1938, he married Rosalinda Octavia Hindson. They had two children, a son and a daughter. He died overnight on the 3 or 4 May 1974 in Nairobi, Kenya.

== Career ==
In 1932, he became Associate of the Imperial College of Tropical Agriculture in Trinidad (AICTA). From 1933 to 1936, he conducted research work on biological control of insect pests on sugar cane in Brazil, British Guiana and the British West Indies. From 1936 to 1939, he did research on biological control of insect pests on coconut palms in the Seychelles, Madagascar and the coastal East Africa. From 1939 to 1941, he was entomologist at the Rubber Research Institute in Malaya.

From 1941 to 1942, he served with the Federal Malay States Volunteers. From 1942 to 1947, he worked as entomologist at the Middle East Anti Locust Unit in Sudan, Saudi Arabia and Oman. From 1947 to 1949, he was senior assistant game warden in Kenya. From 1949 to 1964, he worked as Senior Scientific Officer at the Anti-Locust Research Centre in Abercorn, Northern Rhodesia. He was awarded an MBE in 1946. He was a fellow of both the Royal Entomological Society and of the Royal Geographical Society. In 1964, he became an ecologist and conservationist in the National parks of Tanzania.

His plant collections are on display in the Natural History Museum, the Royal Botanic Gardens, Kew, the Botanische Staatssammlung Munich, the NU Herbarium, University of KwaZulu-Natal, the Muséum National d'Histoire Naturelle, and in the National Herbarium and Botanic Garden of Avondale, Harare, Zimbabwe.

== Honours ==
Vesey-Fitzgerald's burrowing skink (Janetaescincus veseyfitzgeraldi ) from the Seychelles is named in his honour.

== Selected works ==
- 1940: On the Vegetation of Seychelles
- 1955: The Vegetation of the Outbreak Areas of the Red Locust (Nomadacris Septemfasciata Serv.) in Tanganyika and Northern Rhodesia
- 1955: Vegetation of the Red Sea coast south of Jedda, Saudi-Arabia. Journal of Ecology 43:477-489
- 1957: The Vegetation of the Red Sea coast north of Jedda. Saudi Arabia. Journal of Ecology 45:547-562.
- 1957: The vegetation of Central and Eastern Arabia. Journal of Ecology 45_779-798
- 1958: The Snakes of Northern Rhodesia and the Tanganyika Borderlands Brown Knight & Truscott London
- 1963: Annotated List of Grasses Collected in the Congo Drainage Basin of Northern Rhodesia and Tanganyika
- 1963: Central African Grasslands
- 1973: East African Grasslands East African Pub. House
