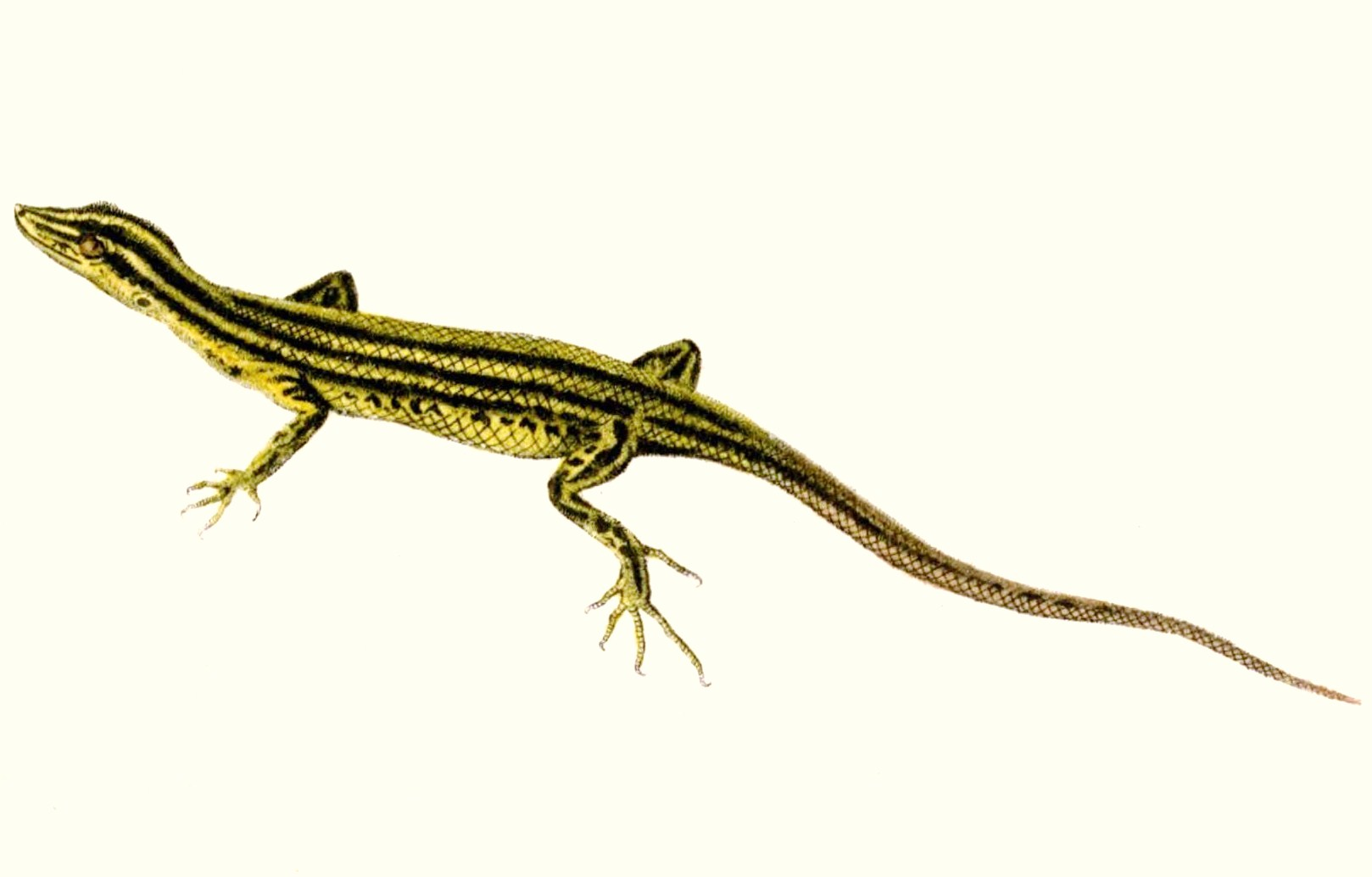
- Cryptoblepharus boutonii

Scientific classification
- Kingdom: Animalia
- Phylum: Chordata
- Class: Reptilia
- Order: Squamata
- Suborder: Scinciformata
- Infraorder: Scincomorpha
- Family: Scincidae
- Subfamily: Eugongylinae

= Eugongylinae =

Subfamily of skinks

Eugongylinae is a subfamily of skinks within the family Scincidae. The genera in this subfamily were previously found to belong the Eugongylus group in the large subfamily Lygosominae.

== Genera ==
The subfamily Eugongylinae contains 469 species in 51 genera.

- Ablepharus (18 species)
- Acritoscincus (3 species)
- Alpinoscincus (2 species)
- Anepischetosia (1 species)
- Austroablepharus (3 species)
- Caesoris (1 species)
- Caledoniscincus (14 species)
- Carinascincus (8 species)
- Carlia (46 species)
- Celatiscincus (2 species)
- Cophoscincopus (4 species)
- Cryptoblepharus (53 species)
- Emoia (78 species)
- Epibator (3 species)
- Eroticoscincus (1 species)
- Eugongylus (5 species)
- Geomyersia (2 species)
- Geoscincus (1 species)
- Graciliscincus (1 species)
- Harrisoniascincus (1 species)
- Kanakysaurus (2 species)
- Kuniesaurus (1 species)
- Lacertaspis (5 species)
- Lacertoides (1 species)
- Lampropholis (14 species)
- Leiolopisma (4 species)
- Leptosiaphos (18 species)
- Liburnascincus (4 species)
- Lioscincus (2 species)
- Lobulia (7 species)
- Lygisaurus (14 species)
- Marmorosphax (5 species)
- Menetia (5 species)
- Morethia (8 species)
- Nannoscincus (12 species)
- Nubeoscincus (2 species)
- Oligosoma (53 species)
- Panaspis (21 species)
- Phaeoscincus (2 species)
- Phasmasaurus (2 species)
- Phoboscincus (2 species)
- Proablepharus (2 species)
- Pseudemoia (6 species)
- Pygmaeascincus (3 species)
- Saproscincus (12 species)
- Sigaloseps (6 species)
- Simiscincus (1 species)
- Tachygia (1 species)
- Techmarscincus (1 species)
- Tropidoscincus (3 species)
