= Tonga ground skink =

- Specimen MNHN-RA 5493 in 2023

Conservation status
- Extinct (1996) (IUCN 3.1)

Scientific classification
- Kingdom: Animalia
- Phylum: Chordata
- Class: Reptilia
- Order: Squamata
- Family: Scincidae
- Subfamily: Eugongylinae
- Genus: Tachygyia; Mittleman, 1952
- Species: †T. microlepis

Binomial name
- †Tachygyia microlepis (Duméril & Bibron, 1839)

Extinct species of lizard

The Tonga ground skink (Tachygyia microlepis) is a presumed extinct species of skink in the subfamily Eugongylinae. It is considered to be extinct by the IUCN Red List, with the only known examples of the species is a pair of specimens collected on Tongatapu during the during the 1826–1829 voyage of the Astrolabe, although archaeological evidence suggests it may also have inhabited ʻEua. It has been suggested that the skink could be extant on ʻEua, remaining undetected due to its elusive nature.

== Taxonomy ==
Tachygyia microlepis was first described in 1839 by André Marie Constant Duméril and Gabriel Bibron in the fifth volume of Erpétologie générale, then as part of the genus Eumeces. A pair of specimens collected by Jean René Constant Quoy and Paul Gaimard during the 1826–1829 voyage of the Astrolabe under Jules Dumont d'Urville were given as syntypes, with the type locality being Tongatapu, Tonga. The specific name microlepis is derived from micro and the Greek lepis 'scale', in reference to the species many small scales around its midbody. After its description, various authors sequentially moved the species to the genuses Otosaurus, Liosoma, (Note: Liosoma Fitzinger, 1843, not Liosoma Brandt 1835, which is a synonym of Chiridota Eschscholtz, 1829, a genus of sea cucumbers.) Lygosoma and Riopa, subgenus Eugongylus, (Note: Later recognized as its own genus.) genus its own before Myron Budd Mittleman finally proposed establishing the monotypic Tachygyia for the species, which is the currently accepted nomenclature. The name Tachygyia is derived from the Greek tachys 'fast' and gyia 'articulation of a limb, limb with an articulation'. In 1976 the species was again suggested to be a member of Eugongylus, this time by Wolfgang Böhme, going off a hypothesis put forward by Allen Eddy Greer in 1974, but this is no longer supported. In 2024 Böhme and Ivan Ineich proposed that Tachygyia microlepis originated from the Central Pacific radiation of the genus Emoia, specifically the Emoia adspersa group of the genus.

== Description ==
The Tonga ground skink was a large lizard, its syntypes having snout–vent lengths of 143 mm (5.6 in) and 177 mm (7.0 in) respectively. Although phylogenetically distant, it shares a strong resemblance with diploglossid lizards endemic to the Caribbean. The namesake midbody scales of the species come in 65 and 67 scale rows in the two specimens collected, which is only surpassed by the over 100 midbody scale rows of the Cape Verde giant skink (Chioninia coctei).

== Extinction ==
The Tonga ground skink has only been described from the specimens collected on Tongatapu during the 1826–1829 voyage of the Astrolabe, and it is generally considered to be extinct, having been listed as such by all of its IUCN Red List assessments, beginning in 1994. (Note: The first assessment in 1994 used the qualified "Extinct?" rather than outright "Extinct".) Archaelogical findings suggest it may at one point also have been present on ʻEua. The skink is believed to have been terrestrial and to have inhabited the forest, and the cause behind its extinction believed to have been caused by human colonization and subsequent habitat loss – over 90% of Tongatapu has been deforested and replaced with agriculture – and predation by introduced species such as pigs, rats, dogs and cats. Prior to its presumed extinction the skink held a place in Tongan folklore. According to one legend, sighting it is an omen of a major family event, such as a wedding or funeral.

Multiple searches for the Tonga ground skink in the last patches of forest on Tongatapu have been undertaken, but all have failed to find the skink. The first person known to have searched for the skink was John R.H. Gibbons, who nicknamed it the "Grey Ghost", and hypothesized that it lived underground and only came out at night or after very heavy rains. Ivan Iveich and Wolfgang Böhme argued in favour of this in their 2024 paper, noting that Jules Dumont d'Urville had reported very heavy rains during the visit of the Astrolabe to Tonga, forcing them above ground where they were found by Quoy and Gaimard. Gibbons searched the remaining forest on Tongatapu with his students from Tupou College, and in 1986, he offered a 100 paʻanga bounty in the Tonga Chronicle for a picture or specimen of a lizard. many supposed sightings were reported, but they were of skins in the genus Emoia. After Gibbons, one more search is known to have been undertaken by Ivan Ineich and George Robert Zug in October 1997.

Ineich and Böhme stated that, while it is unlikely that the species has survived on Tongatapu, it is possible that it is extant on ʻEua and the small island Kalau to the south of ʻEua, suggesting that it, like Emoia adspersa, which they argued was a close relative, was difficult to observe in the field and could therefore have remained undetected on the islands where searches for it have not been carried out – they stated that they believed this to be the case.
