= Geomyersia coggeri =

Conservation status
- Least Concern (IUCN 3.1)

Scientific classification
- Kingdom: Animalia
- Phylum: Chordata
- Class: Reptilia
- Order: Squamata
- Family: Scincidae
- Genus: Geomyersia
- Species: G. coggeri

Binomial name
- Geomyersia coggeri Greer, 1982

Species of lizard

Geomyersia coggeri, Cogger's island skink, is a species of lizard in the family Scincidae. The species is endemic to the Admiralty Islands.

== Etymology ==
The specific name, coggeri, is in honor of Australian herpetologist Harold Cogger.

== Habitat ==
The preferred natural habitat of G. coggeri is forest, but it has also been found under debris in coconut plantations.

== Description ==
G. coggeri is a small, brown lizard, with a rounded snout. It has four short well-developed legs, with five digits on each foot.

== Reproduction ==
The mode of reproduction of G. coggeri is unknown.
