= Geomyersia glabra =

Conservation status
- Near Threatened (IUCN 3.1)

Scientific classification
- Kingdom: Animalia
- Phylum: Chordata
- Class: Reptilia
- Order: Squamata
- Suborder: Scinciformata
- Infraorder: Scincomorpha
- Family: Eugongylidae
- Genus: Geomyersia
- Species: G. glabra

Binomial name
- Geomyersia glabra Greer & Parker, 1968

Species of lizard

Geomyersia glabra, the Greer's island skink or Solomon minute skink, is a species of lizard in the family Scincidae. It is found in the Solomon Islands.
