= Protoblepharus nyingchiensis =

Scientific classification
- Kingdom: Animalia
- Phylum: Chordata
- Class: Reptilia
- Order: Squamata
- Family: Scincidae
- Genus: Protoblepharus
- Species: P. nyingchiensis

Binomial name
- Protoblepharus nyingchiensis Jiang, Wu, Guo, Wang, Ding, & Che, 2020

Species of reptile

Protoblepharus nyingchiensis is a species of skink. It is endemic to Tibet.
