= Tropidoscincus variabilis =

Conservation status
- Least Concern (IUCN 3.1)

Scientific classification
- Kingdom: Animalia
- Phylum: Chordata
- Class: Reptilia
- Order: Squamata
- Family: Scincidae
- Genus: Tropidoscincus
- Species: T. variabilis

Binomial name
- Tropidoscincus variabilis (Bavay, 1869)
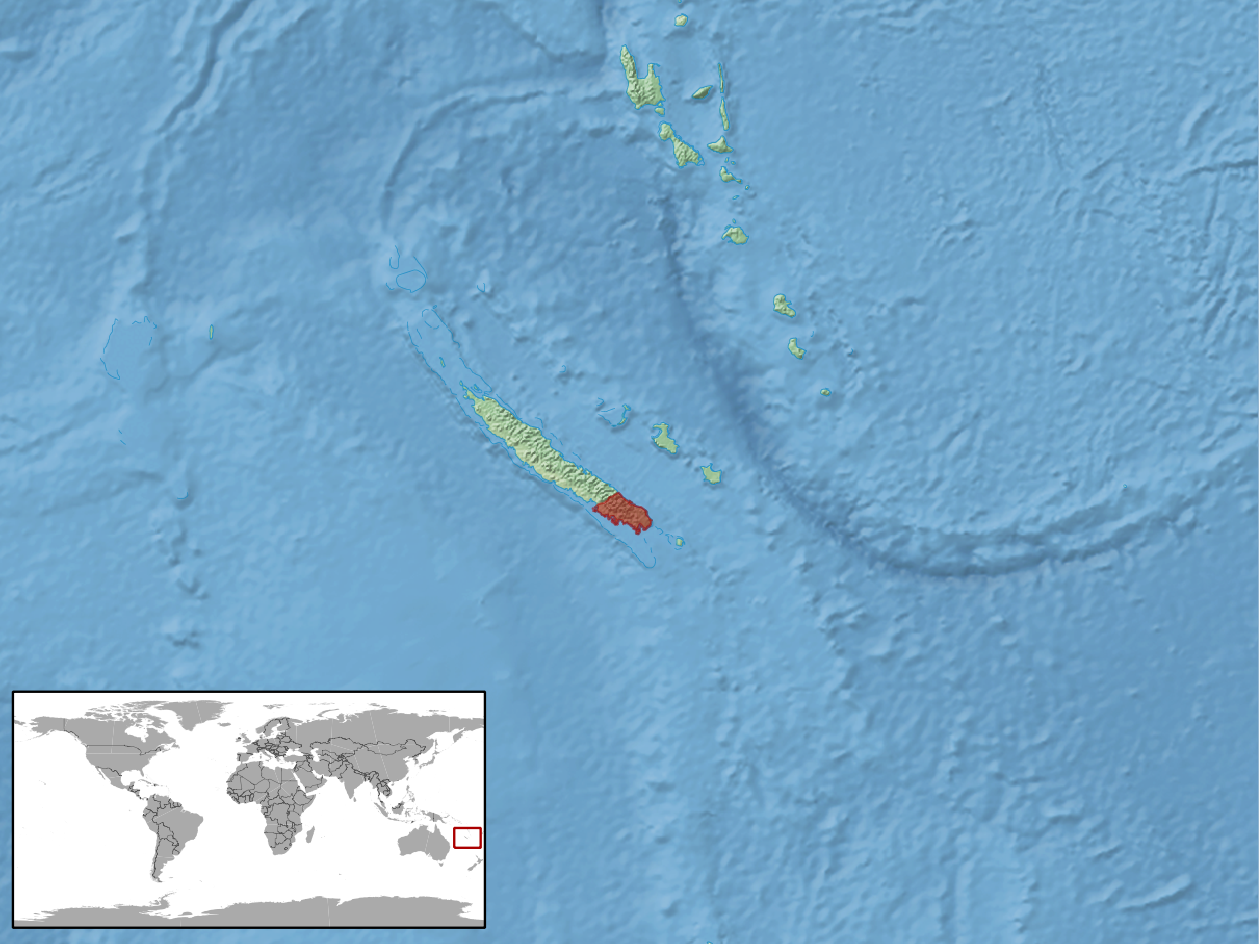

Species of lizard

The southern whiptailed skink (Tropidoscincus variabilis) is a species of skink found in New Caledonia. Tropidoscincus variabilis is a medium-sized, long-limbed and long-tailed skink with strong ontogenetic change in coloration. They are more brightly colored as juveniles. They live primarily in forests and heathlands. Mature males and females are roughly the same size, but females have longer bodies, shorter heads and limbs, and a less brightly orange venter. Females lay 2–4 eggs in summer, and young hatch in late summer. More than one year of growth is required to attain maturity. They eat a large variety of invertebrates, particularly spiders and crickets. Juveniles eat more spiders, bugs and isopods than adults.
