= Tropidoscincus aubrianus =

Conservation status
- Vulnerable (IUCN 3.1)

Scientific classification
- Kingdom: Animalia
- Phylum: Chordata
- Class: Reptilia
- Order: Squamata
- Family: Scincidae
- Genus: Tropidoscincus
- Species: T. aubrianus

Binomial name
- Tropidoscincus aubrianus Bocage, 1873
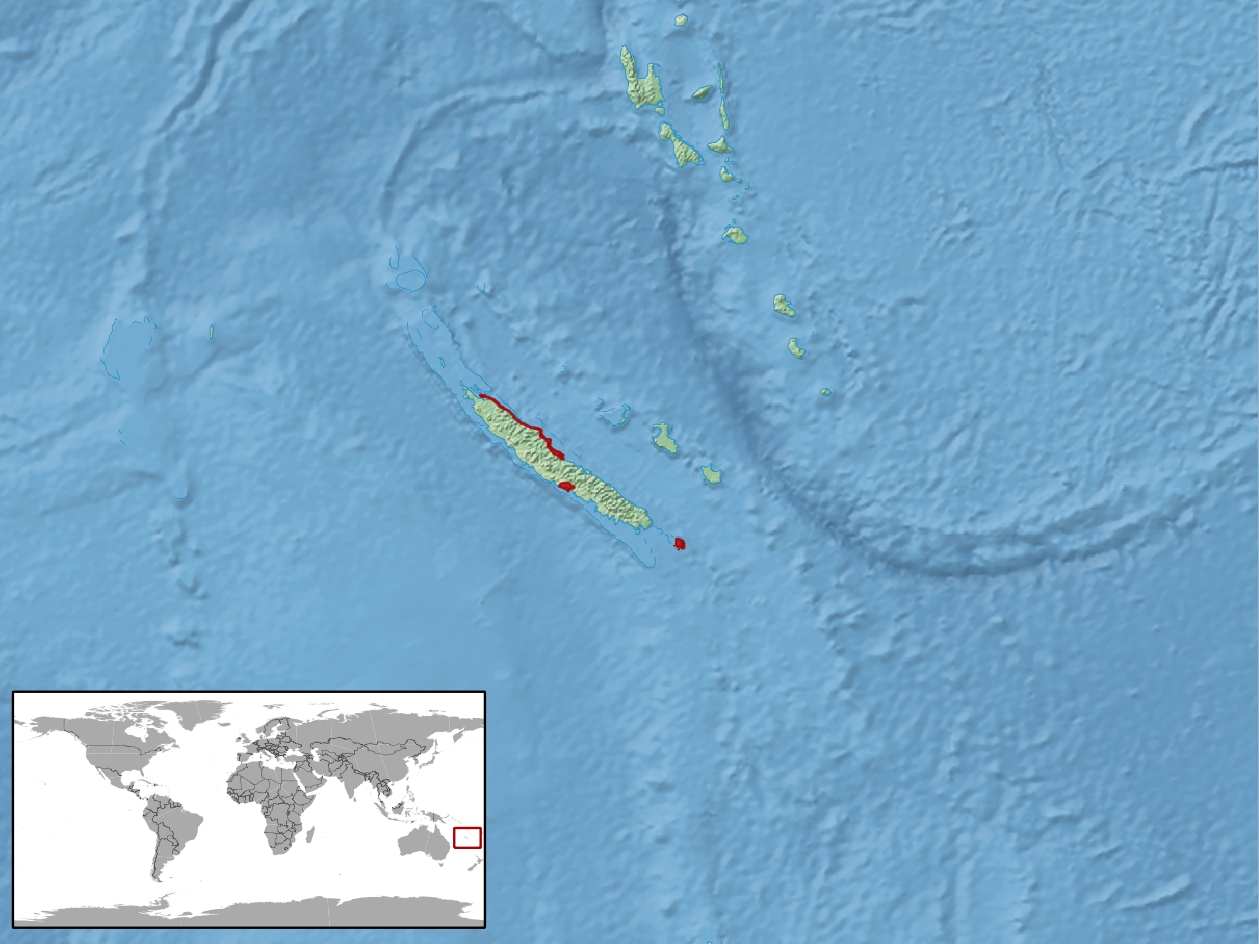

Species of lizard

Aubrey's whiptailed skink (Tropidoscincus aubrianus) is a species of skink found in New Caledonia.
