= Tropidoscincus boreus =

Conservation status
- Least Concern (IUCN 3.1)

Scientific classification
- Kingdom: Animalia
- Phylum: Chordata
- Class: Reptilia
- Order: Squamata
- Family: Scincidae
- Genus: Tropidoscincus
- Species: T. boreus

Binomial name
- Tropidoscincus boreus Sadlier & Bauer, 2000
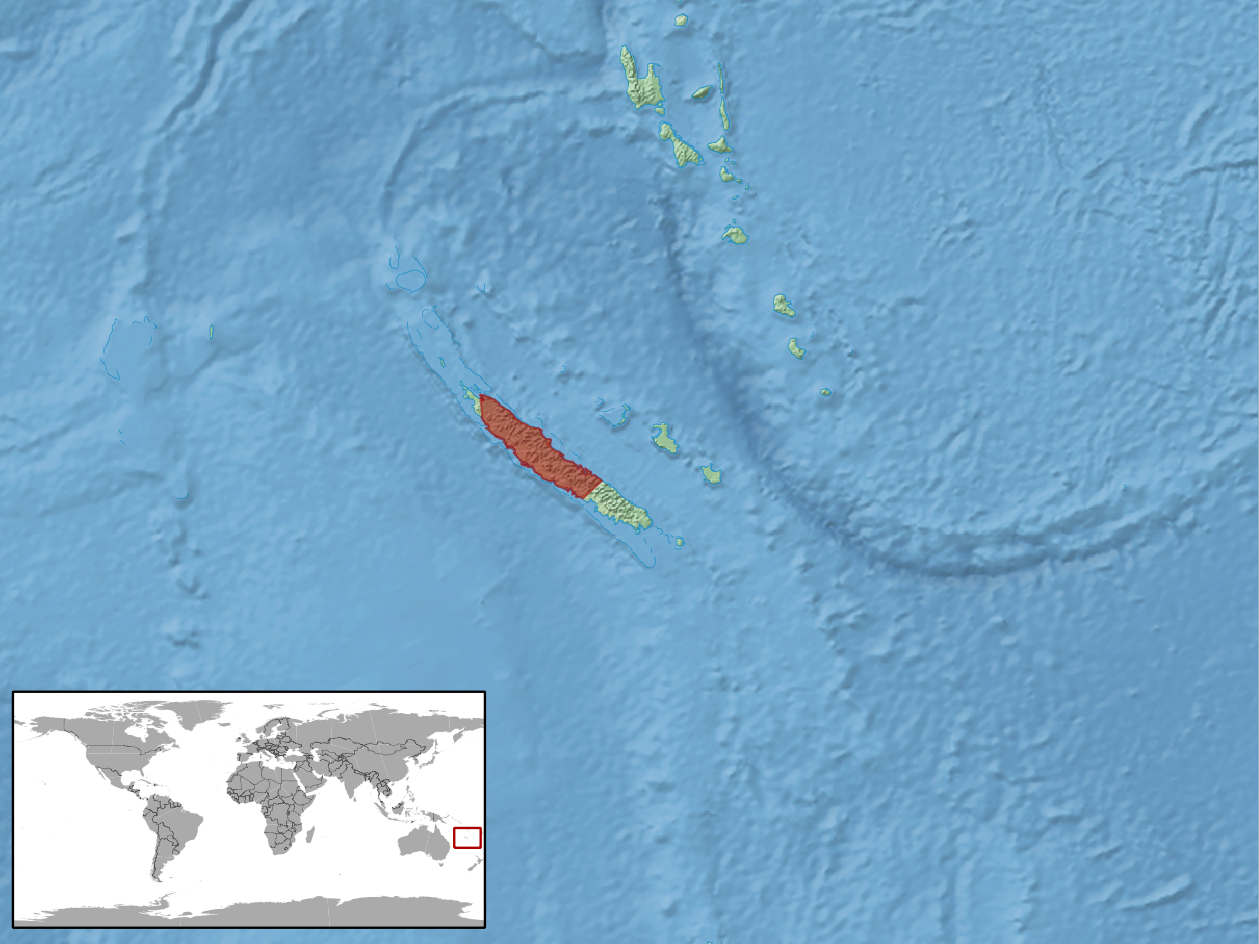

Species of lizard

Tropidoscincus boreus is a species of skink found in New Caledonia.
