= Phasmasaurus maruia =

Conservation status
- Vulnerable (IUCN 3.1)

Scientific classification
- Kingdom: Animalia
- Phylum: Chordata
- Class: Reptilia
- Order: Squamata
- Family: Scincidae
- Genus: Phasmasaurus
- Species: P. maruia

Binomial name
- Phasmasaurus maruia Sadlier, Whitaker, & Bauer, 1998
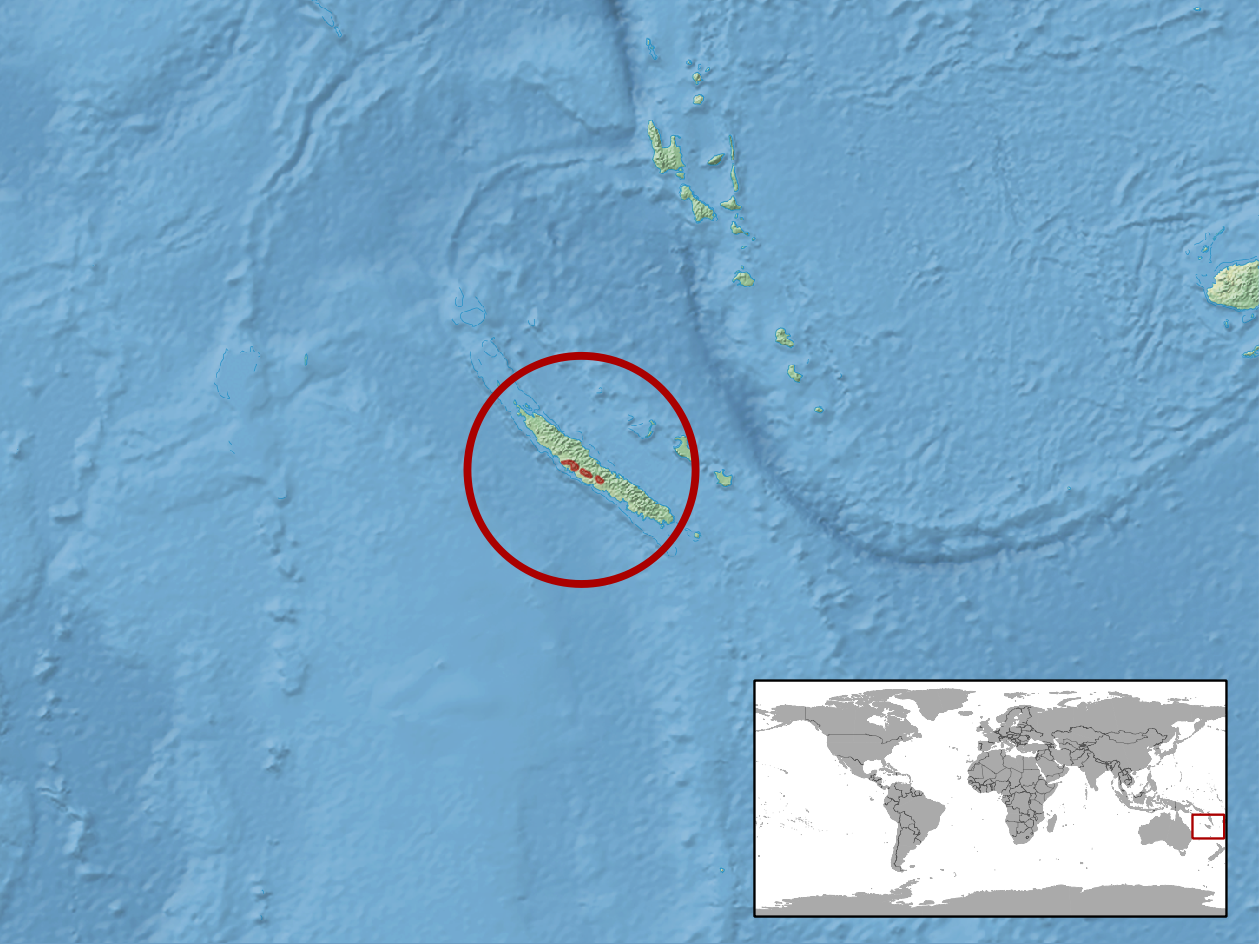

Species of lizard

Phasmasaurus maruia, the Maruia Maquis skink, is a species of skink found in New Caledonia.
