= Phaeoscincus ouinensis =

Scientific classification
- Kingdom: Animalia
- Phylum: Chordata
- Class: Reptilia
- Order: Squamata
- Family: Scincidae
- Genus: Phaeoscincus
- Species: P. ouinensis

Binomial name
- Phaeoscincus ouinensis Sadlier, Shea, & Bauer, 2014

Species of lizard

Phaeoscincus ouinensis is a species of skink found in New Caledonia.
