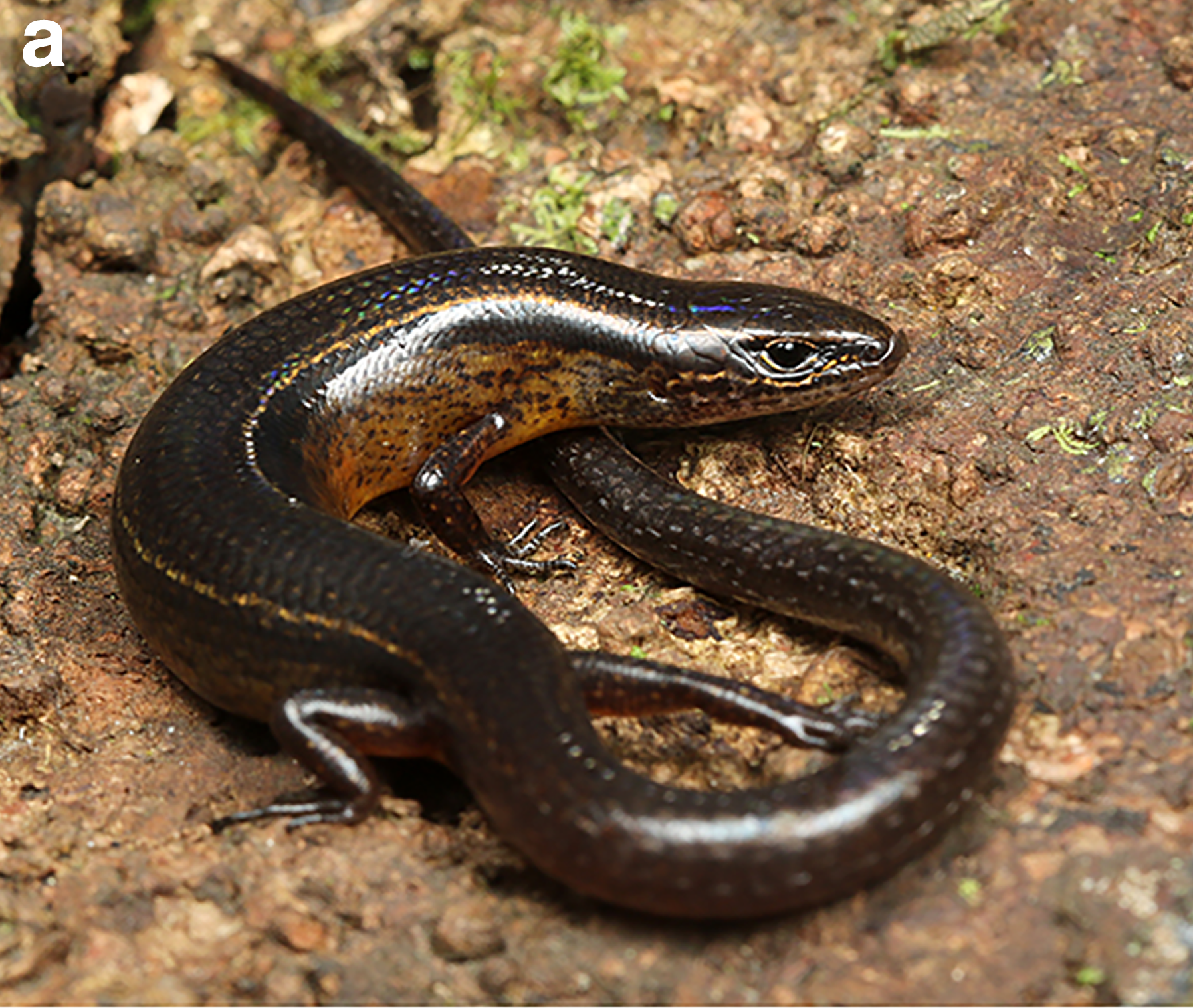

Scientific classification
- Kingdom: Animalia
- Phylum: Chordata
- Class: Reptilia
- Order: Squamata
- Family: Scincidae
- Genus: Protoblepharus
- Species: P. apatani

Binomial name
- Protoblepharus apatani Mirza, Bragin, Bhosale, Gowande, Patel, & Poyarkov, 2022

= Protoblepharus apatani =

Species of reptile

Protoblepharus apatani is a species of skink. It was discovered during a herpetological investigation of the Indian state of Arunachal Pradesh and is endemic to the East Himalayan Mountains.

== Etymology ==
The generic epithet Protoblepharus is a Latinized combination of the Greek words proto (πρωτό), meaning ‘primitive’ and blepharo (βλέφaρο) meaning ‘eyelid’, which is a reference to ablepharine skinks. The epithet apatani is meant to honor the Apatani tribe of Ziro Valley in Arunachal Pradesh, who helped and assisted the fieldwork in Arunachal Pradesh.

== Description ==
Protoblepharus apatani has a small to medium-sized body, up to 63mm. Its body scales are glossy, smooth or striated. The holotype was golden brown with a broad dark stripe gradually diffusing with the background colour at the mid-body.
