= Protoblepharus medogensis =

Scientific classification
- Kingdom: Animalia
- Phylum: Chordata
- Class: Reptilia
- Order: Squamata
- Family: Scincidae
- Genus: Protoblepharus
- Species: P. medogensis

Binomial name
- Protoblepharus medogensis Jiang, Wu, Guo, Li, & Che, 2020

Species of reptile

Protoblepharus medogensis is a species of skink. It is endemic to Tibet.
