= Phasmasaurus tillieri =

Conservation status
- Near Threatened (IUCN 3.1)

Scientific classification
- Kingdom: Animalia
- Phylum: Chordata
- Class: Reptilia
- Order: Squamata
- Family: Scincidae
- Genus: Phasmasaurus
- Species: P. tillieri

Binomial name
- Phasmasaurus tillieri (Ineich & Sadlier, 1991)

Synonyms
- Leiolopisma tillieri Ineich & Sadlier, 1991; Lioscincus tillieri — Bauer & Sadlier, 1993; Phasmasaurus tillieri — Sadlier et al., 2015

Species of lizard

Phasmasaurus tillieri, commonly known as Tillier's maquis skink, is a species of lizard in the family Scincidae. It is endemic to New Caledonia.

== Etymology ==
The specific name, tillieri, is in honor of French zoologist Simon Tillier.

== Geographic range ==
P. tillieri is found in southern New Caledonia.

== Habitat ==
The preferred natural habitats of P. tillieri are grassland and shrubland, at altitudes up to 1,000 m (3,300 ft).

== Description ==
P. tillieri may attain a snout-to-vent length (SVL) of 6.4 cm (2.5 in). The tail is extremely long, up to three times SVL. The limbs and digits are well-developed.

== Reproduction ==
The mode of reproduction of P. tillieri is not known.
