= Harald Meier =

German herpetologist

Harald Meier (1922 – 2007) was a German herpetologist.

== Taxa described by Meier ==
Meier described several new taxa of geckos, including Phelsuma pusilla hallmanni and Phelsuma borbonica mater, subspecies of geckos.

== Taxa named in honor of Meier ==
Meier is commemorated in the scientific names of three taxa:

- Mantella haraldmeieri, a frog
- Geoscincus haraldmeieri, a lizard
- Zonosaurus haraldmeieri, a lizard
