= Frederick McCoy =

Irish palaeontologist, zoologist and museum administrator

Sir Frederick McCoy KCMG FRS
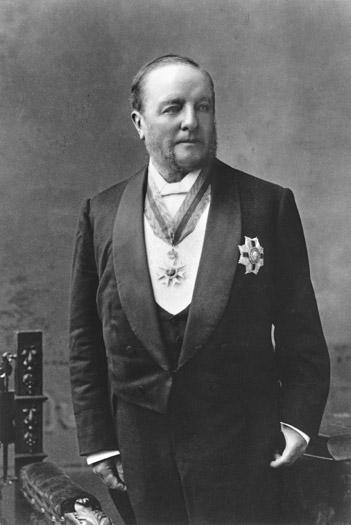
- Born: 1817; Dublin
- Died: 16 May 1899; Melbourne
- Occupation: Professor of natural sciences at the University of Melbourne
- Awards: Murchison Medal (1879); Clarke Medal (1881)

Sir Frederick McCoy KCMG FRS (1817 – 23 May 1899), was an Irish palaeontologist, zoologist, and museum administrator, active in Australia. He is noted for founding the Botanic Garden of the University of Melbourne in 1856.

== Early life ==
McCoy (sometimes spelled M'Coy) was the son of Simon McCoy and was born in Dublin; some sources have his year of birth as 1823, however 1817 is the most likely. He was educated in Dublin and at Cambridge for the medical profession.

== Palaeontology career ==
McCoy's interests, however, became early centred in natural history and, especially, palaeontology. At the age of eighteen he published a Catalogue of Organic Remains compiled from specimens exhibited in the Rotunda at Dublin (1841). He assisted Sir Richard Griffith by studying the fossils of the carboniferous and silurian rocks of Ireland, resulting in two publications: A Synopsis of the Character of Carboniferous Limestone Fossils of Ireland (1844) and Synopsis of the Silurian Fossils of Ireland (1846). The Griffith fossil collection was gifted to the Royal Dublin Society and is now in the National Museum of Ireland - Natural History.

In 1846 Adam Sedgwick secured his services, and for at least four years he devoted himself to the determination and arrangement of the fossils in the Woodwardian Museum at Cambridge. Sedgwick wrote of him as "an excellent naturalist, an incomparable and most philosophical palaeontologist, and one of the steadiest and quickest workmen that ever undertook the arrangement of a museum" (Life and Letters of Sedgwick, ii. 194). Together they prepared the important and now classic work entitled A Synopsis of the Classification of the British Palaeozoic Rocks, with a Systematic Description of the British Palaeozoic Fossils in the Geological Museum of the University of Cambridge. Meanwhile, McCoy in 1850 had been appointed professor of geology in Queen's College, Belfast.

McCoy's examination of fossil material preserving the teeth of Thylacoleo, an extinct carnivore, saw him enter the debate on the apparent absence of large predators in Australia's mammalian fauna; McCoy sided with Richard Owen's interpretation of his new species as representing a "marsupial lion".

== Career in Australia ==
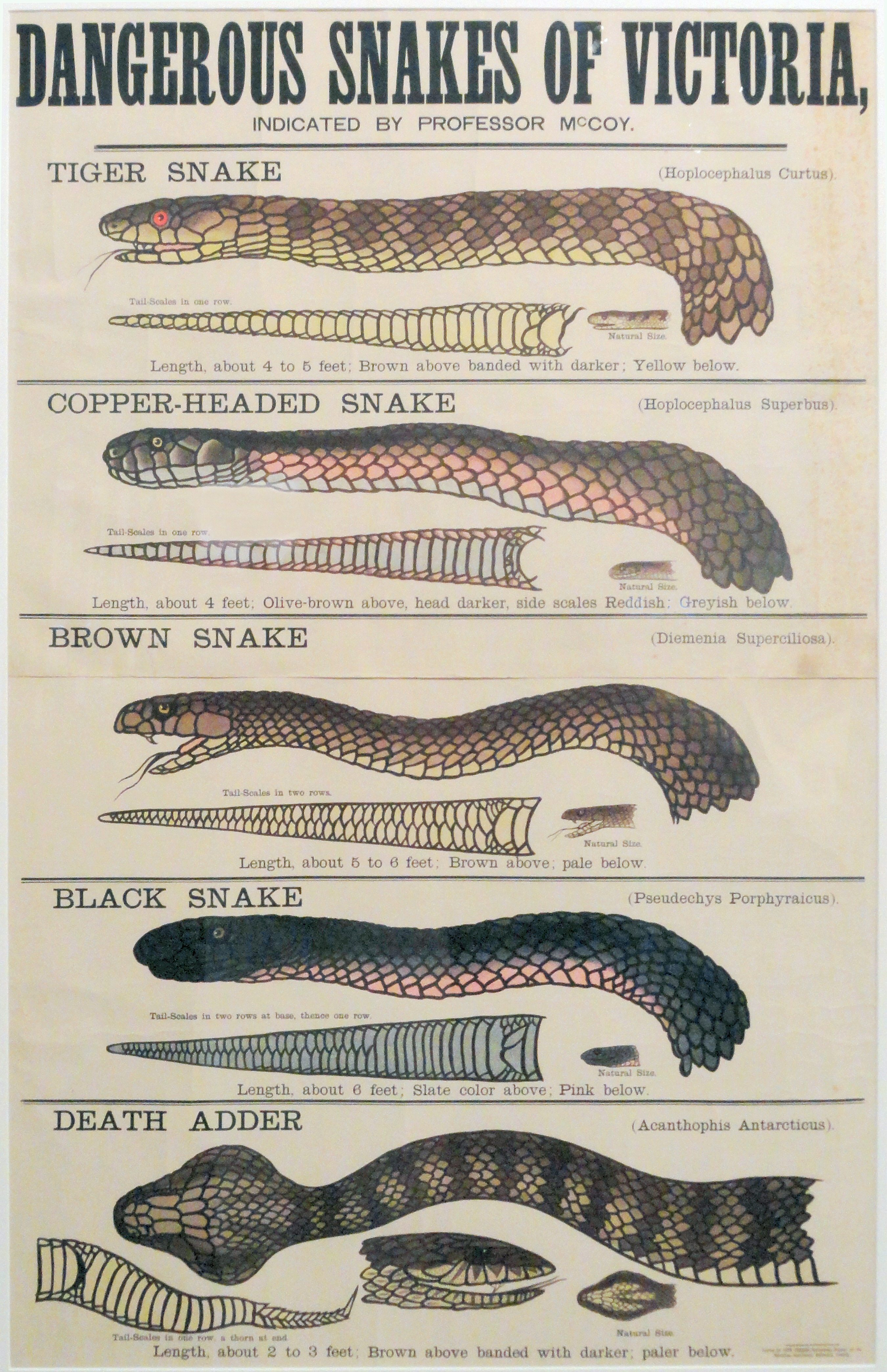
In 1877, an educational poster bearing McCoy's name was published showing the "dangerous snakes of Victoria". This poster "imprinted McCoy's name into the minds of generations of Victorian schoolchildren, in association with those images of deadly serpents."

In 1857, he took over the National Museum of Natural History and Geology in Melbourne. He convinced the Melbourne University and state Government to house the museum at the university. After a new building for it was constructed, it was re-opened as the National Museum of Victoria in 1864. McCoy built up significant natural history and geological collections for the museum, as well as spending a substantial sum setting up a reference library to assist the scientific research undertaken by the museum's first curators. McCoy was in correspondence with several prominent scientists and collectors of the time, including John Gould, from whom he purchased specimens, including mammals, insects, shells, and bird skins, as well as copies of Gould's scientific publications for the museum.

McCoy, on becoming associated with the Geological Survey of Victoria as palaeontologist, composed the volumes concerning his field as Prodromus of the Palaeontology of Victoria (1874–82). He also issued the Prodromus of the Zoology of Victoria (1885–90). He was president of the Royal Society of Victoria in 1864 and vice-president in 1861 and 1870.

Frederick McCoy described three species of Australia's venomous snakes during 1878–1879, including Oxyuranus microlepidotus, commonly known as the inland taipan or fierce snake, which is considered to be the world's most venomous snake.

McCoy helped to found a society intended to introduce exotic animals to Australia by "acclimatisation", responsible for the release of fish, mammals and flocks of birds with an often disastrous ecological impact; the Acclimatisation Society would later be renamed the Victorian Zoological Society. McCoy sought to replace what he perceived as the silence or unpleasant noises of the Australian bush with sounds of English songbirds, and celebrated the successful introduction of the european rabbit and starling which were already recognised as pests by the colonial farmers.

== Creationism ==
McCoy was a Christian creationist who rejected evolution and natural selection. He argued that the paleontological record offered evidence of the sudden appearance and disappearance of species. The abrupt appearance of species was the result of supernatural plan. He thus supported a form of progressive creationism.

W. R. Gerdtz, in a 2001 paper in The Victorian Naturalist, noted that "McCoy's belief in the Creator's perfect and universal plan of successive creation appeared to be contradicted by the fossil evidence McCoy himself described."

== Late life ==
McCoy contributed many papers to local societies, and continued his active scientific work for fifty-eight years – his last contribution, "Note on a new Australian Pterygotus," was printed in the Geological Magazine for May 1899.

== Recognition ==
He was awarded the Murchison Medal of the Geological Society of London in 1879, was elected F.R.S. in 1880, and was one of the first to receive the Hon. D.Sc. from the University of Cambridge.

In 1886, he was made CMG, and in 1891 KCMG. He died in Melbourne on 16 May 1899.

A species of Australian lizard, Anepischetosia maccoyi, is named in his honour, as is Southern bluefin tuna, Thunnus maccoyii.

The McCoy Society for Field Investigation and Research was formed in 1935 at the University of Melbourne, and emulated in the Ralph Tate Society of the University of Adelaide.

McCoy's life and career was commemorated by two special issues of The Victorian Naturalist published in 2001.

== Sources ==
- Bonney, Thomas George (1901). "McCoy, Frederick" . In Lee, Sidney (ed.). Dictionary of National Biography (1st supplement). London: Smith, Elder & Co.
- Serle, Percival (1949). "McCoy, Frederick". Dictionary of Australian Biography. Sydney: Angus & Robertson.
- G. C. Fendley, 'McCoy, Sir Frederick (1817–1899)', Australian Dictionary of Biography, Volume 5, MUP, 1974, pp 134–136.
- Wilkinson, Ian R. (1996a), "The Battle for the Museum: Frederick McCoy and the Establishment of the National Museum of Victoria at the University of Melbourne", Historical Records of Australian Science, Vol.1, No.1, (January 1996), pp. 1–11. doi:10.1071/HR9961110001
- Wilkinson, Ian R. (1996b), "Frederick McCoy—First Science Professor at the University of Melbourne", History of Education Review, Vol.25, No.1, (1996), pp. 54–70.

Awards
Preceded by Thomas Huxley	Clarke Medal; 1881	Succeeded by James Dwight Dana
