= Geomyersia =

Scientific classification
- Kingdom: Animalia
- Phylum: Chordata
- Class: Reptilia
- Order: Squamata
- Family: Scincidae
- Subfamily: Eugongylinae
- Genus: Geomyersia; Greer & F. Parker, 1968

Type species
- Geomyersia glabra Greer & F. Parker, 1968

Diversity
- 2 species (see text)

Genus of lizards

Geomyersia is a small genus of skinks, lizards in the family Scincidae. The genus is endemic to the Bismarck Archipelago and the Solomon Islands.

== Species and geographic ranges ==
There are two species which are recognized as being valid:

- Geomyersia coggeri Greer, 1982 – Cogger's island skink – Bismarck Archipelago
- Geomyersia glabra Greer & F. Parker, 1968 – Greer's island skink, Solomon minute skink – Solomon Islands

== Etymology ==
The generic name, Geomyersia, is in honor of American herpetologist George S. Myers.
