= Eroticoscincus =

Scientific classification
- Kingdom: Animalia
- Phylum: Chordata
- Class: Reptilia
- Order: Squamata
- Family: Scincidae
- Subfamily: Eugongylinae
- Genus: Eroticoscincus; Wells and Wellington, 1984
- Species: E. graciloides

Binomial name
- Eroticoscincus graciloides (Lönnberg and Andersson, 1913)

Genus of lizards

Eroticoscincus is a genus of skinks from Queensland, Australia. It is monotypic, the sole species being Eroticoscincus graciloides.
