= Tropidoscincus =

Scientific classification
- Domain: Eukaryota
- Kingdom: Animalia
- Phylum: Chordata
- Class: Reptilia
- Order: Squamata
- Family: Scincidae
- Subfamily: Eugongylinae
- Genus: Tropidoscincus; Bocage, 1873

Species
- 3 sp., see text
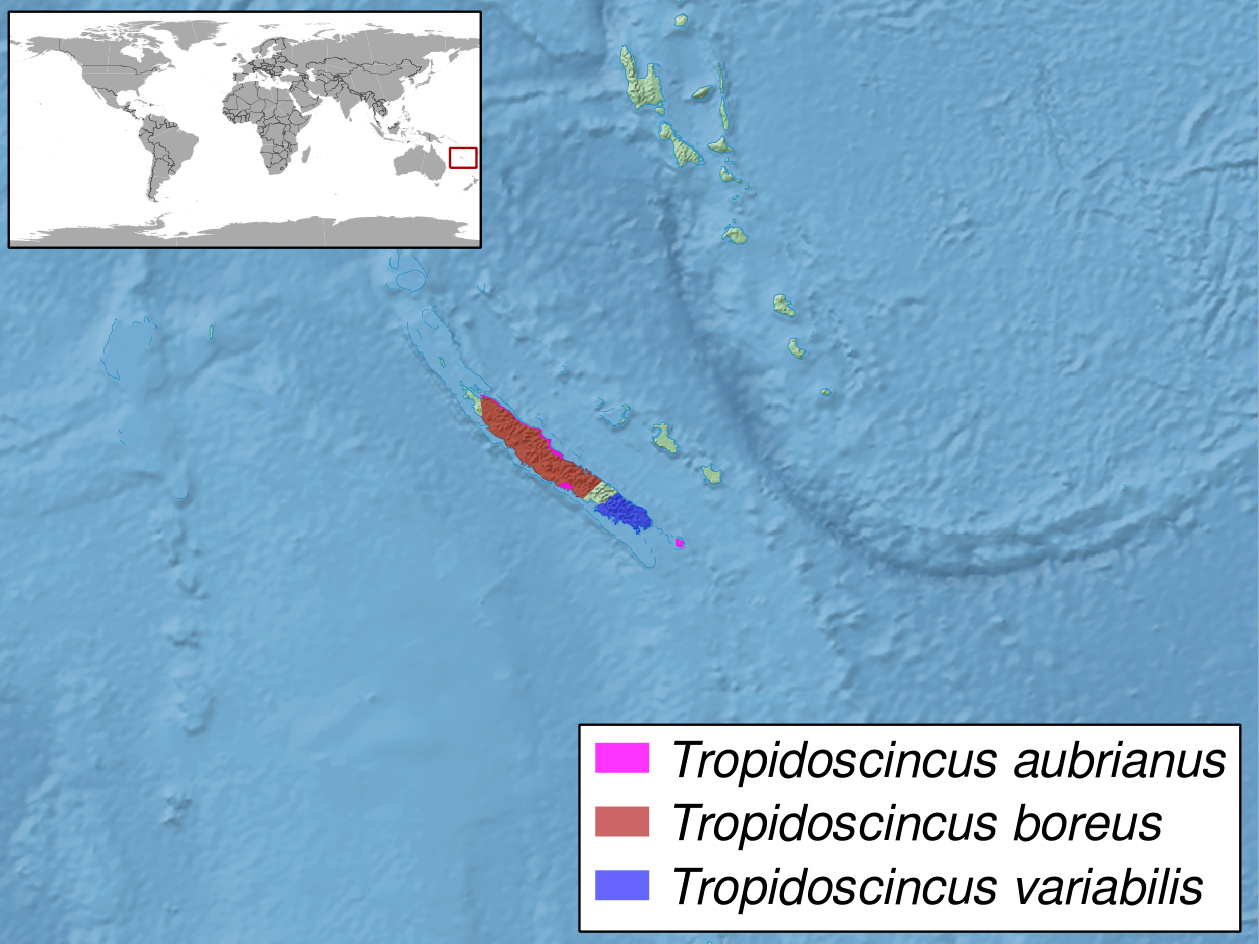

Genus of lizards

Tropidoscincus is a genus of skink. They are all endemic to New Caledonia.

== Classification ==
- Tropidoscincus aubrianus Bocage, 1873 – Aubrey's whiptailed skink
- Tropidoscincus boreus Sadlier & Bauer, 2000 – northern whiptailed skink
- Tropidoscincus variabilis (Bavay, 1869) – southern whiptailed skink

Nota bene: A binomial authority in parentheses indicates that the species was originally described in a genus other than Tropidoscincus.
