= Emoia adspersa =

Conservation status
- Endangered (IUCN 3.1)

Scientific classification
- Kingdom: Animalia
- Phylum: Chordata
- Class: Reptilia
- Order: Squamata
- Suborder: Scinciformata
- Infraorder: Scincomorpha
- Family: Eugongylidae
- Genus: Emoia
- Species: E. adspersa

Binomial name
- Emoia adspersa (Steindachner, 1870)
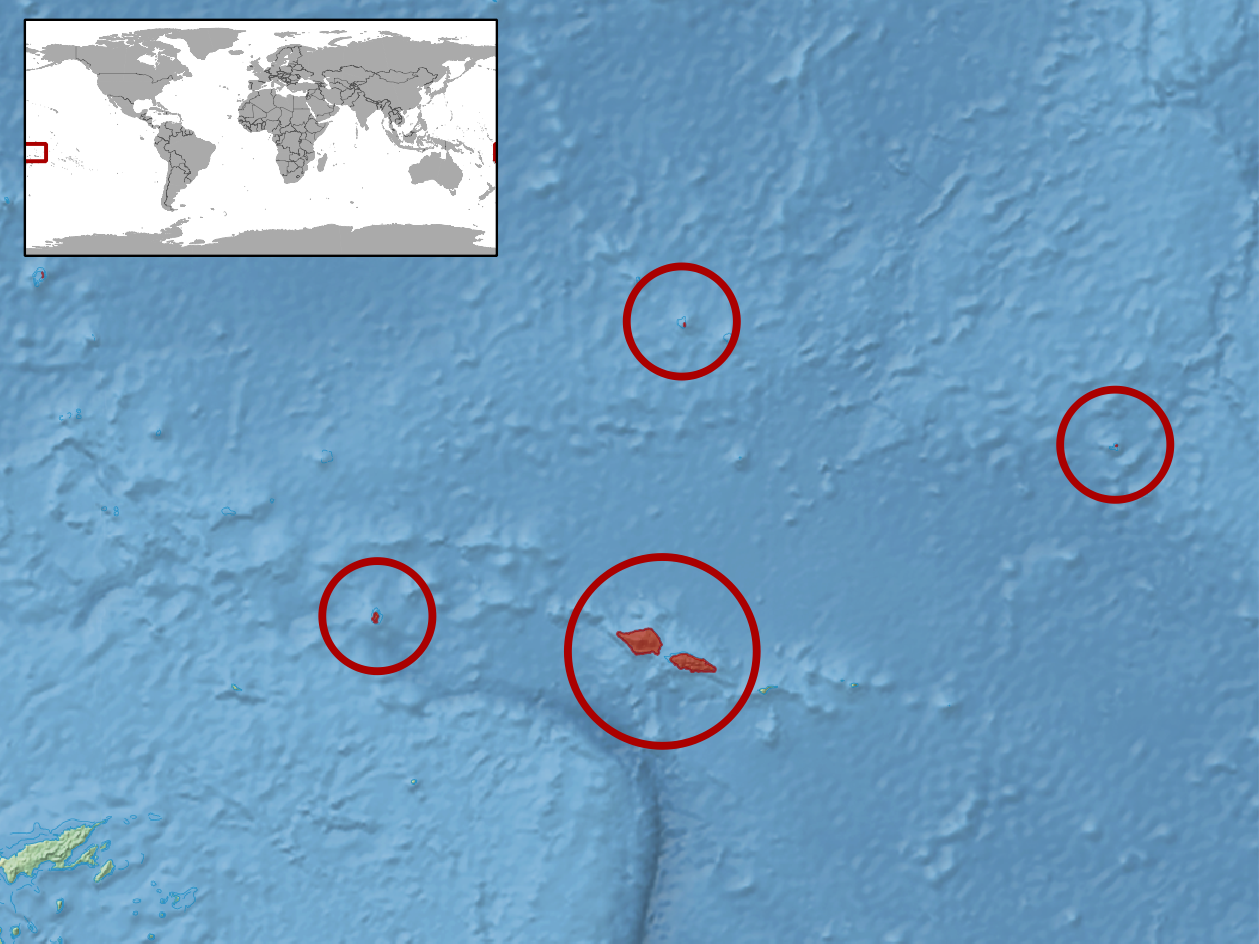

Species of reptile

Emoia adspersa, Steindachner's emo skink, the Micronesian skink, dark-sided emoia, dark-sided skink, or dateline emoia, is a species of lizard in the family Scincidae. It is found in Micronesia. The species has also been noted to occur on Niuafoʻou, the northernmost island of Tonga, with sightings in 1930 and 1994. The species is not present on other Tongan islands, and is possibly present due to waif dispersal occurring during Polynesian migration.
