= Geoscincus =

Conservation status
- Data Deficient (IUCN 3.1)

Scientific classification
- Kingdom: Animalia
- Phylum: Chordata
- Class: Reptilia
- Order: Squamata
- Family: Scincidae
- Subfamily: Eugongylinae
- Genus: Geoscincus; Sadlier, 1987
- Species: G. haraldmeieri

Binomial name
- Geoscincus haraldmeieri (Böhme, 1976)
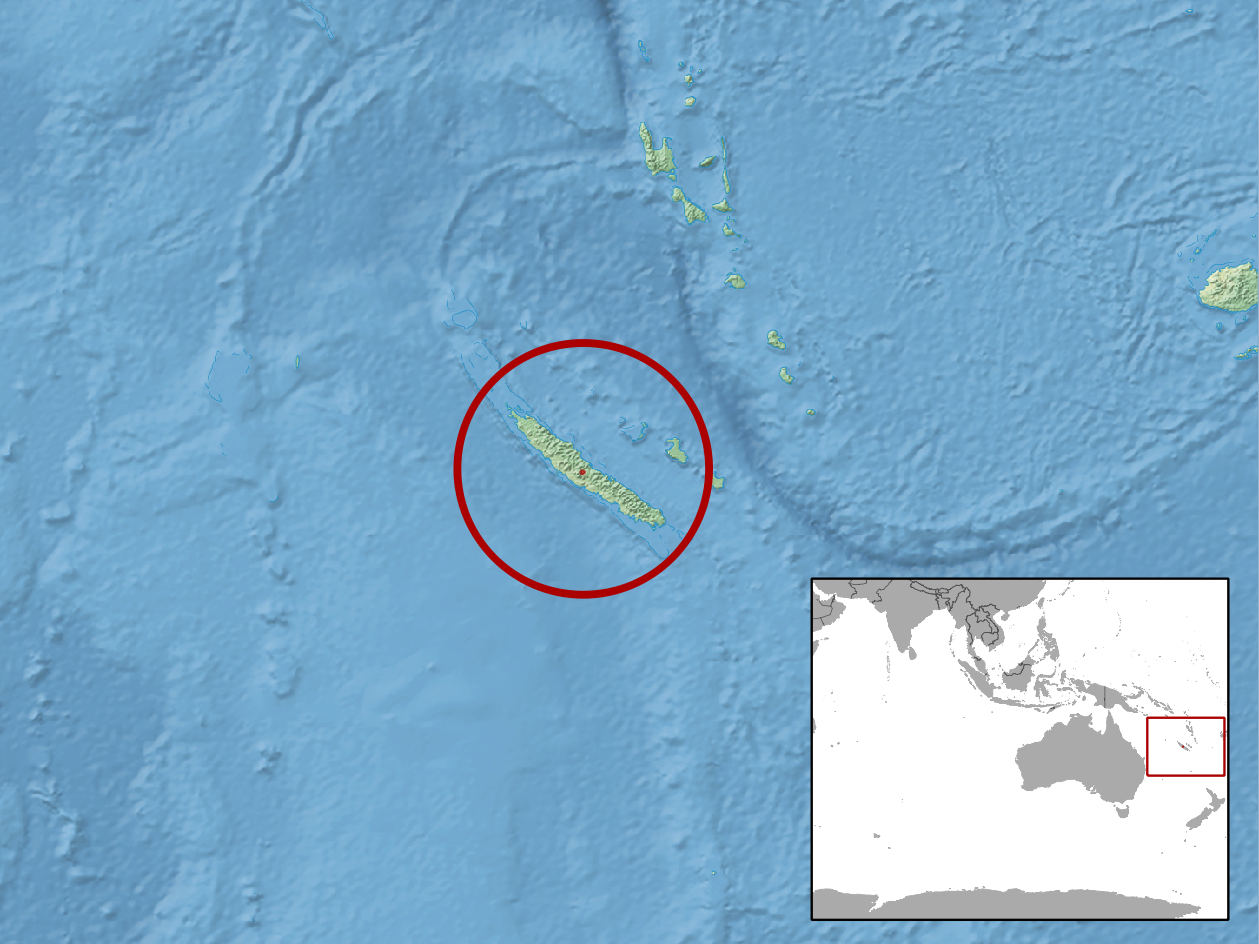

Synonyms
- Eugongylus haraldmeieri Böhme, 1976; Geoscincus haraldmeieri — Sadlier, 1987

Genus of lizards

Geoscincus is a monotypic genus of skink in the subfamily Eugongylinae of the family Scincidae. The only accepted species is Geoscincus haraldmeieri, also known commonly as Meier's skink, which is endemic to New Caledonia.

== Etymology ==
Geoscincus haraldmeieri is named after German herpetologist Harald Meier.

== Geographic range ==
Geoscincus haraldmeieri is only known from two specimens collected near Coula, New Caledonia.

== Habitat and conservation status ==
The two specimens of Geoscincus haraldmeieri were collected in forest habitat though the type locality has been substaintially altered since 1976 and the species' conservation status remained unknown as 2021.

== Behavior ==
Geoscincus haraldmeieri is terrestrial and semi-fossorial.

== Reproduction ==
The mode of reproduction of Geoscincus haraldmeieri is unknown.
