= Phasmasaurus =

Scientific classification
- Kingdom: Animalia
- Phylum: Chordata
- Class: Reptilia
- Order: Squamata
- Family: Scincidae
- Subfamily: Eugongylinae
- Genus: Phasmasaurus; Sadlier, Bauer, Shea, & Smith, 2015

Species
- 2 sp., see text

Genus of lizards

Phasmasaurus is a genus of skinks. Both species are endemic to New Caledonia.

== Species ==
The following 2 species, listed alphabetically by specific name, are recognized as being valid:

- Phasmasaurus maruia (Sadlier, Whitaker & Bauer, 1998) - Maruia Maquis skink
- Phasmasaurus tillieri (Ineich & Sadlier, 1991) - Tiller's Maquis skink

Nota bene: A binomial authority in parentheses indicates that the species was originally described in a genus other than Phasmasaurus.
