= Protoblepharus =

Scientific classification
- Kingdom: Animalia
- Phylum: Chordata
- Class: Reptilia
- Order: Squamata
- Family: Scincidae
- Subfamily: Sphenomorphinae
- Genus: Protoblepharus; Mirza, Bragin, Bhosale, Gowande, Patel, & Poyarkov, 2022

Genus of lizards

Protoblepharus is a genus of skinks.

== Species ==
The following 3 species are recognized as being valid.

- Protoblepharus apatani Mirza, Bragin, Bhosale, Gowande, Patel, & Poyarkov, 2022
- Protoblepharus medogensis Jiang, Wu, Guo, Li, & Che, 2020
- Protoblepharus nyingchiensis Jiang, Wu, Guo, Wang, Ding, & Che, 2020

Nota bene: A binomial authority in parentheses indicates that the species was originally described in a genus other than Protoblepharus.
