= Orange-bellied burrowing skink =

Conservation status
- Vulnerable (IUCN 3.1)

Scientific classification
- Kingdom: Animalia
- Phylum: Chordata
- Class: Reptilia
- Order: Squamata
- Family: Scincidae
- Subfamily: Eugongylinae
- Genus: Simiscincus; Sadlier & Bauer, 1997
- Species: S. aurantiacus

Binomial name
- Simiscincus aurantiacus Sadlier & Bauer, 1997
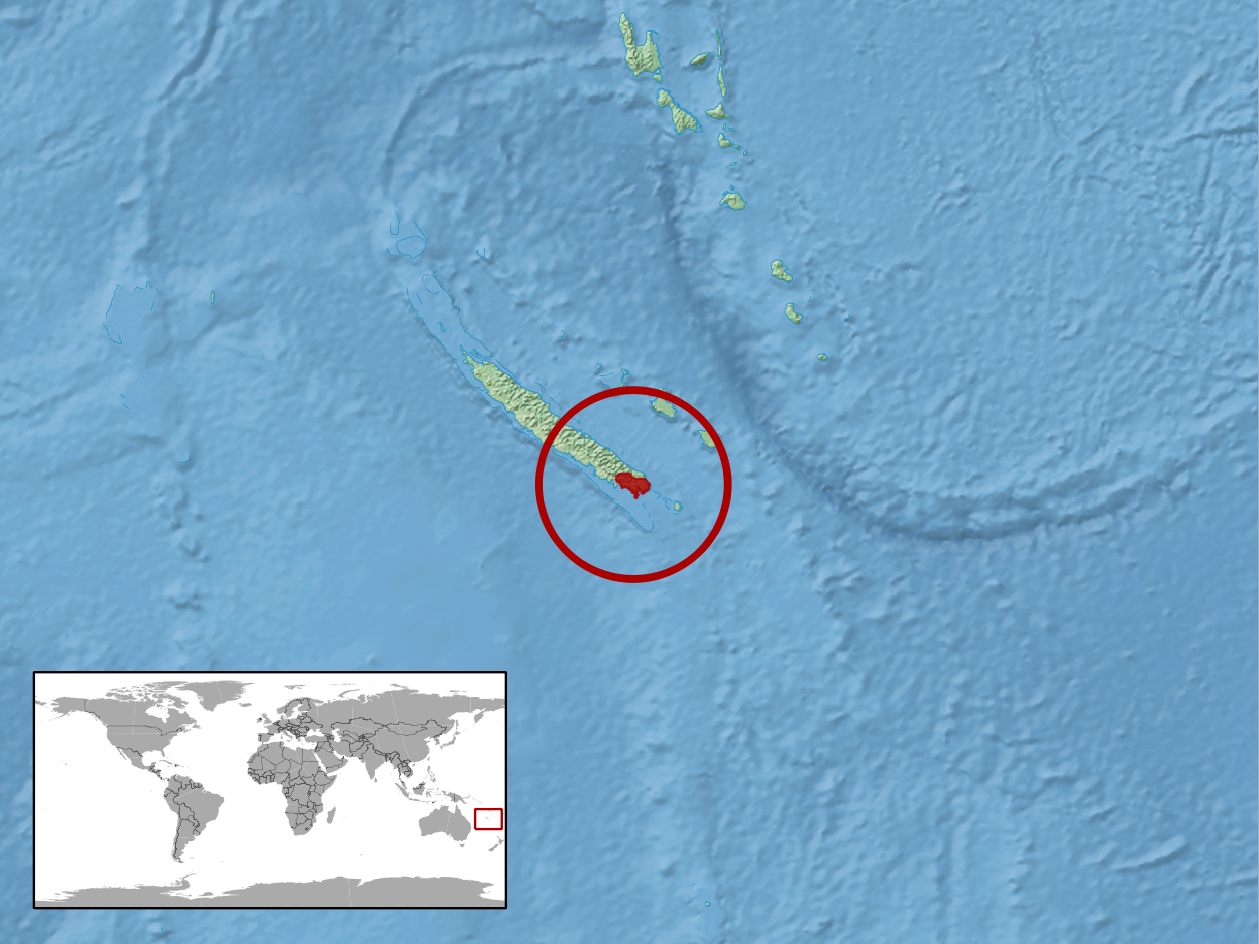

Species of lizard

The orange-bellied burrowing skink (Simiscincus aurantiacus) is a skink. It is monotypic in the genus Simiscincus. It is endemic to New Caledonia.
