= Calorodius =

Conservation status
- Least Concern (IUCN 3.1)

Scientific classification
- Kingdom: Animalia
- Phylum: Chordata
- Class: Reptilia
- Order: Squamata
- Family: Scincidae
- Genus: Calorodius; Oliver, Torkolla, Worthington-Wilmer, & Couper, 2022
- Species: C. thorntonensis

Binomial name
- Calorodius thorntonensis Greer, 1983

Species of lizard

The Thornton Peak calyptotis or Thornton Peak skink (Calorodius thorntonensis) is a species of skink found in Queensland in Australia.
