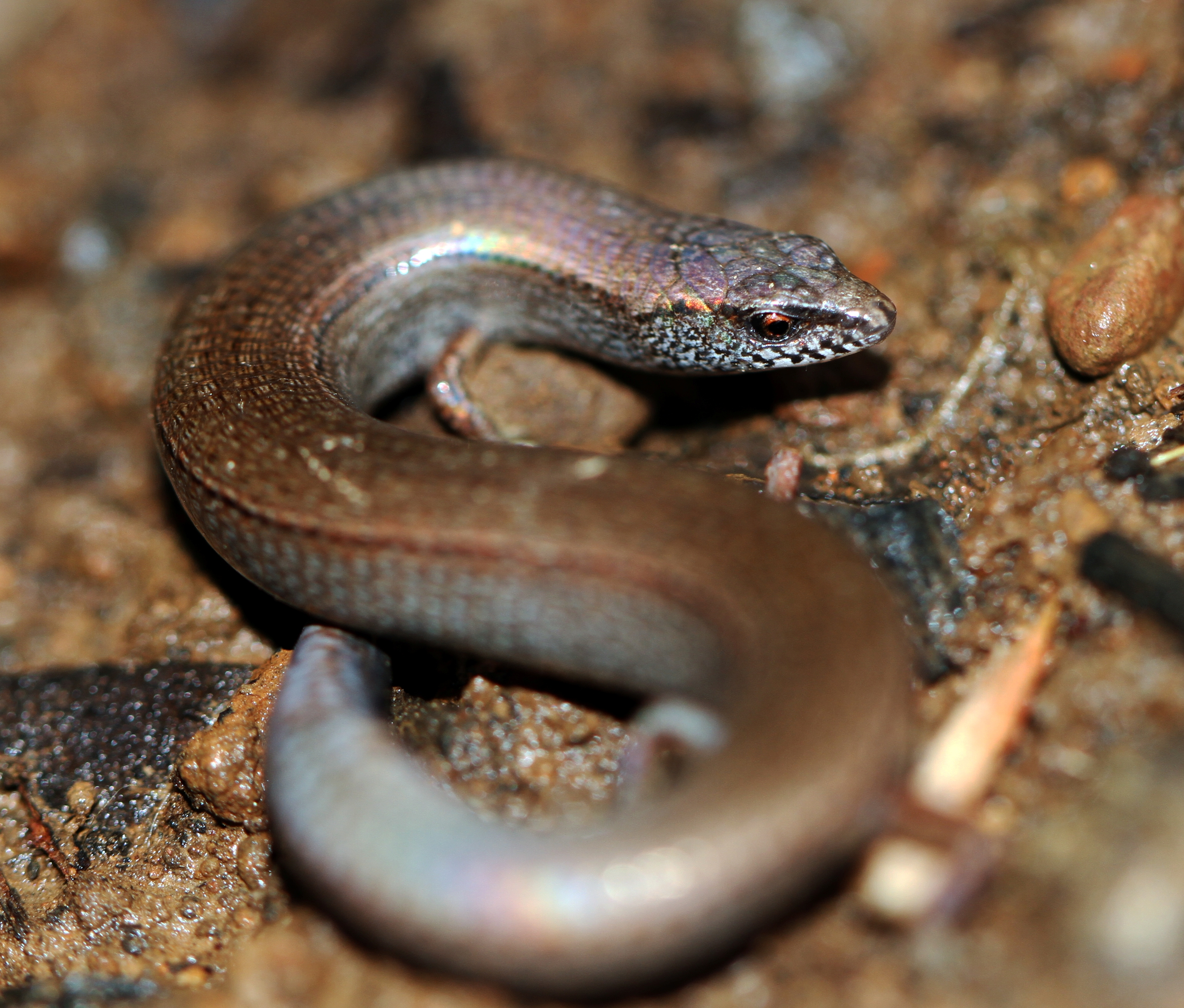

Conservation status
- Least Concern (IUCN 3.1)

Scientific classification
- Kingdom: Animalia
- Phylum: Chordata
- Class: Reptilia
- Order: Squamata
- Family: Scincidae
- Subfamily: Eugongylinae
- Genus: Anepischetosia; Wells & Wellington, 1985
- Species: A. maccoyi

Binomial name
- Anepischetosia maccoyi (Lucas & C. Frost, 1894)

Synonyms
- Siaphos maccoyi Lucas & C. Frost, 1894; Lygosoma (Leiolopisma) maccoyi — M.A. Smith, 1937; Anotis maccoyi — Greer, 1974; Hemiergis maccoyi — Cogger, 1983; Anepischetos [sic] maccoyi — Wells & Wellington, 1984; Anepischetos sharmani Wells & Wellington, 1984; Anepischetosia maccoyi — Wells & Wellington, 1985; Anepischetosia brindabellaensis Wells & Wellington, 1985; Nannoscincus (Nannoseps) maccoyi — Sadlier, 1990; Anepischetosia maccoyi — Sadlier et al., 2006

= Maccoy's elf skink =

Species of lizard

Anepischetosia maccoyi, also known commonly as the highlands forest-skink, highlands forest skink, Maccoy's elf skink, and McCoy's skink, is a species of lizard in the subfamily Eugongylinae of the family Scincidae. The species is the only species in the monotypic genus Anepischetosia, and is endemic to Australia.

== Etymology ==
The specific name, maccoyi, is in honor of Irish zoologist Frederick McCoy.

== Taxonomy ==
The generic name, Anepischetosia, was created by Australian herpetologists Richard W. Wells and C. Ross Wellington in 1985 to replace the generic name, Anepischetos, which was preoccupied by a genus of moths. Anepischetosia is in the subfamily Eugongylinae.

== Geographic distribution ==
Anepischetosia maccoyi is found in the Australian States of New South Wales, South Australia, and Victoria.

== Habitat ==
The preferred natural habitat of Anepischetosia maccoyi is forest.

== Behaviour ==
Anepischetosia maccoyi is terrestrial. It shelters under leaf litter and fallen logs.

== Reproduction ==
Anepischetosia maccoyi appears to be ovoviviparous. The Reptile Database describes the species as being oviparous. However, Lucas and Frost, in their original description of the species in 1894, wrote, "Young developed within the body of the parent, eight or nine being brought forth in January or February."
