= Suppressascincus =

Conservation status
- Least Concern (IUCN 3.1)

Scientific classification
- Missing taxonomy template (fix): Suppressascincus
- Species: Template:Taxonomy/SuppressascincusS. pluto

Binomial name
- Template:Taxonomy/SuppressascincusSuppressascincus pluto Ingram, 1977

Species of skink

The Cape York worm-skink (Suppressascincus pluto) is a species of skink found in Queensland in Australia.
