= Blue-mouthed skink =

Conservation status
- Least Concern (IUCN 3.1)

Scientific classification
- Kingdom: Animalia
- Phylum: Chordata
- Class: Reptilia
- Order: Squamata
- Family: Scincidae
- Genus: Caesoris; Sadlier, Bauer, Shea, & Smith, 2015
- Species: C. novaecaledoniae

Binomial name
- Caesoris novaecaledoniae (Parker, 1926)

Synonyms
- Lygosoma novae-caledoniae; Leiolopisma novaecaledonicum; Leiolopisma novaecaledoniae; Lioscincus novaecaledoniae; Leiolopisma vovaecaledoniae

Species of lizard

The blue-mouthed skink (Caesoris novaecaledoniae) is a skink in the (family Scincidae). It is monotypic in the genus Caesoris. It is endemic to New Caledonia.
