= Graciliscincus =

Graciliscincus shonae

Conservation status
- Vulnerable (IUCN 3.1)

Scientific classification
- Kingdom: Animalia
- Phylum: Chordata
- Class: Reptilia
- Order: Squamata
- Family: Scincidae
- Genus: Graciliscincus; Sadlier, 1987
- Species: G. shonae

Binomial name
- Graciliscincus shonae Sadlier, 1987
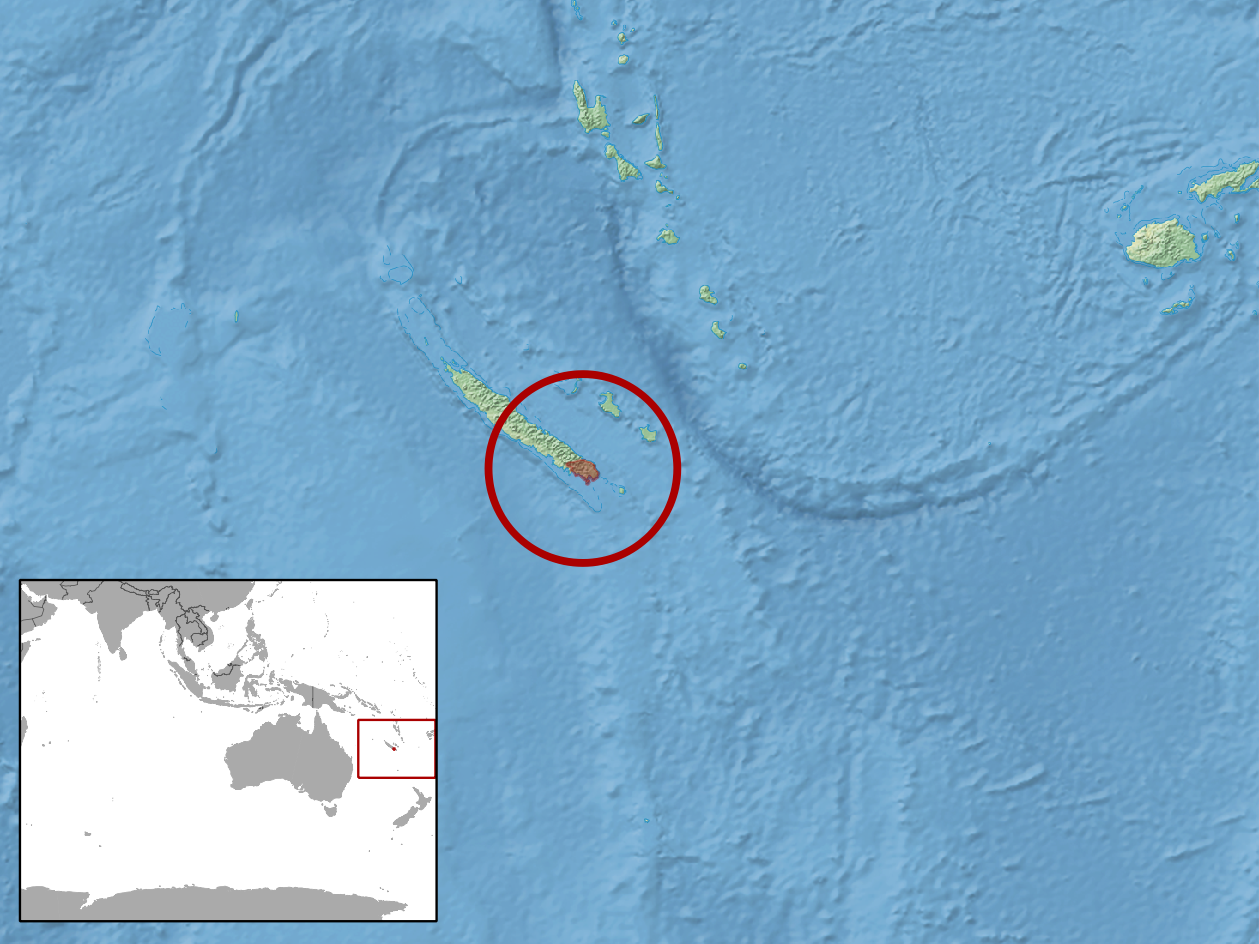

Genus of lizards

Graciliscincus is a lizard genus in the family Scincidae. The genus is indigenous to New Caledonia.

== Species and geographic range ==
The genus Graciliscincus contains the single species Graciliscincus shonae, known commonly as Sadlier's skink or the gracile burrowing skink.

== Geographic range ==
G. shonae is endemic to New Caledonia.

== Habitat ==
The preferred natural habitat of G. shonae is forest, at altitudes of 150–900 m (490–2,950 ft).

== Etymology ==
The specific name, shonae, is in honor of Shona von Sturmer Sadlier, who was the wife of the describer.

== Conservation status ==
G. shonae is threatened by habitat loss and fragmentation.
