= New Caledonian leopard skink =

Conservation status
- Vulnerable (IUCN 3.1)

Scientific classification
- Kingdom: Animalia
- Phylum: Chordata
- Class: Reptilia
- Order: Squamata
- Family: Scincidae
- Genus: Lacertoides; Sadlier, Shea, & Bauer, 1997
- Species: L. pardalis

Binomial name
- Lacertoides pardalis Sadlier, Shea, & Bauer, 1997
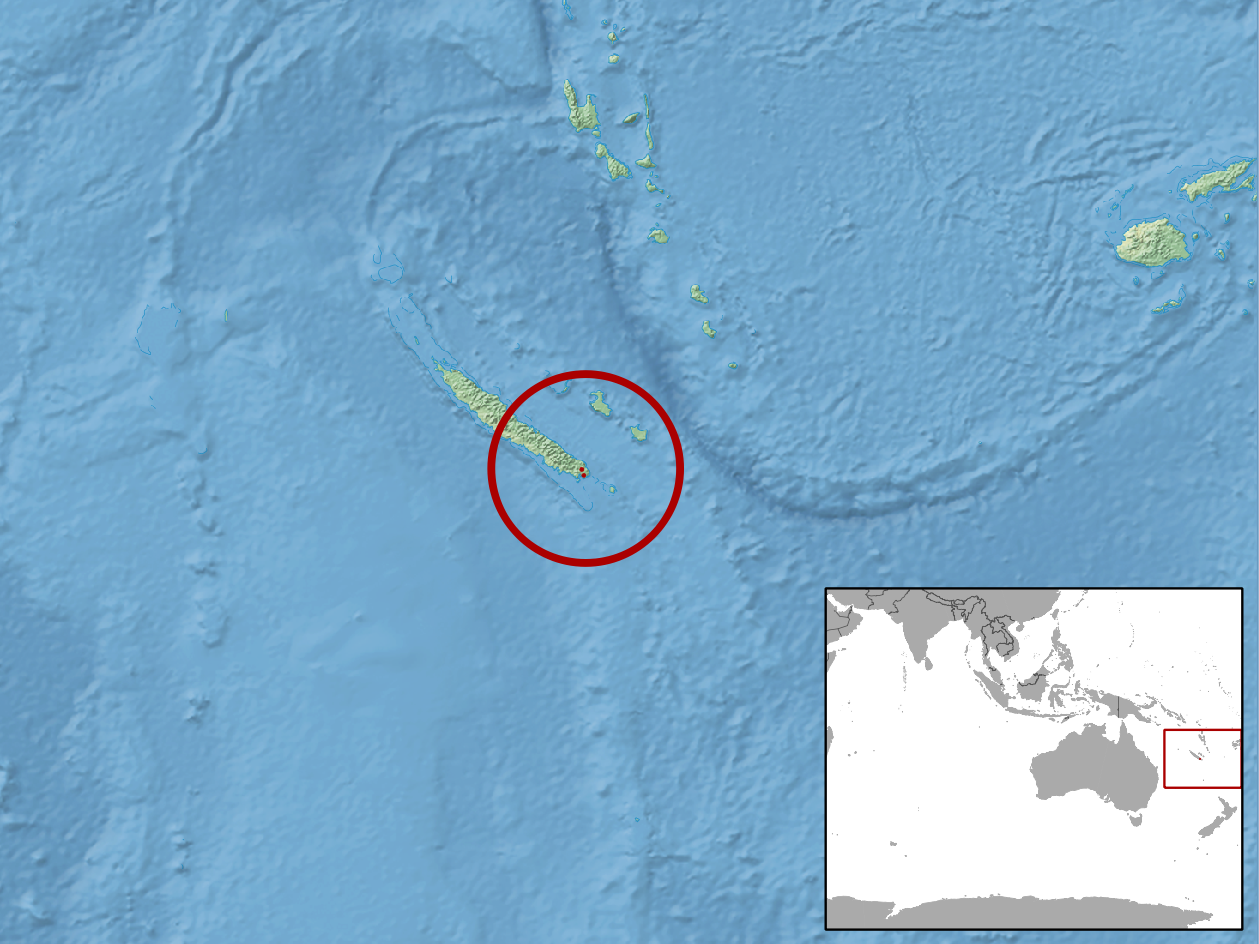

Species of lizard

The New Caledonian leopard skink (Lacertoides pardalis) is a species of skink monotypic in the genus Lacertoides. It is endemic to New Caledonia.
