= Harrisoniascincus =

Conservation status
- Least Concern (IUCN 3.1)

Scientific classification
- Kingdom: Animalia
- Phylum: Chordata
- Class: Reptilia
- Order: Squamata
- Family: Scincidae
- Genus: Harrisoniascincus; Wells & Wellington, 1985
- Species: H. zia

Binomial name
- Harrisoniascincus zia (Ingram & Ehmann, 1981)

Synonyms
- Leiolopisma zia; Cautula zia; Pseudemoia zia

Genus of lizards

Harrisoniascincus zia is also known as the rainforest cool-skink or beech skink. It is monotypic in the genus Harrisoniascincus. It is endemic to Australia.
