= Kuniesaurus =

Scientific classification
- Kingdom: Animalia
- Phylum: Chordata
- Class: Reptilia
- Order: Squamata
- Family: Scincidae
- Genus: Kuniesaurus; Sadlier, Deuss, Bauer, and Jourdan, 2019
- Species: K. albiauris

Binomial name
- Kuniesaurus albiauris Sadlier, Deuss, Bauer, and Jourdan, 2019

Species of skink

Kuniesaurus albiauris is a species of skink endemic to New Caledonia. It is the only species in the monotypic genus Kuniesaurus.

Kuniesaurus albiauris is only known from a small patch of dense coastal forest with limestone substrate on the Isle of Pines. Due to its very small and restricted habitat, it is highly threatened by invasive species such as the little fire ant. It has been proposed that Kuniesaurus be classified as Critically Endangered on the IUCN Red List.

Kuniesaurus albiauris is a small-sized species, with adults measuring less than 50 mm (2.0 in) in snout–vent length.
