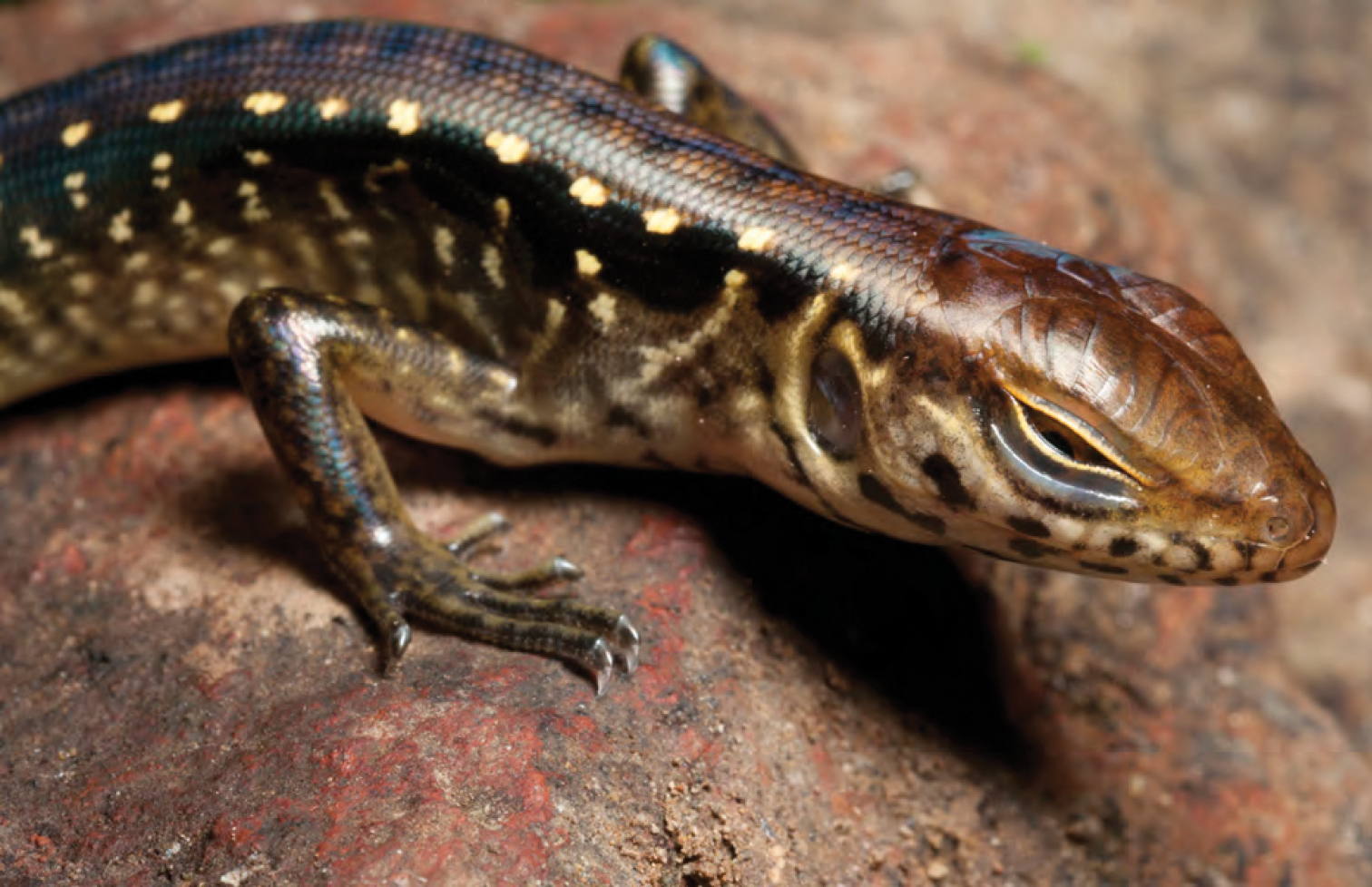

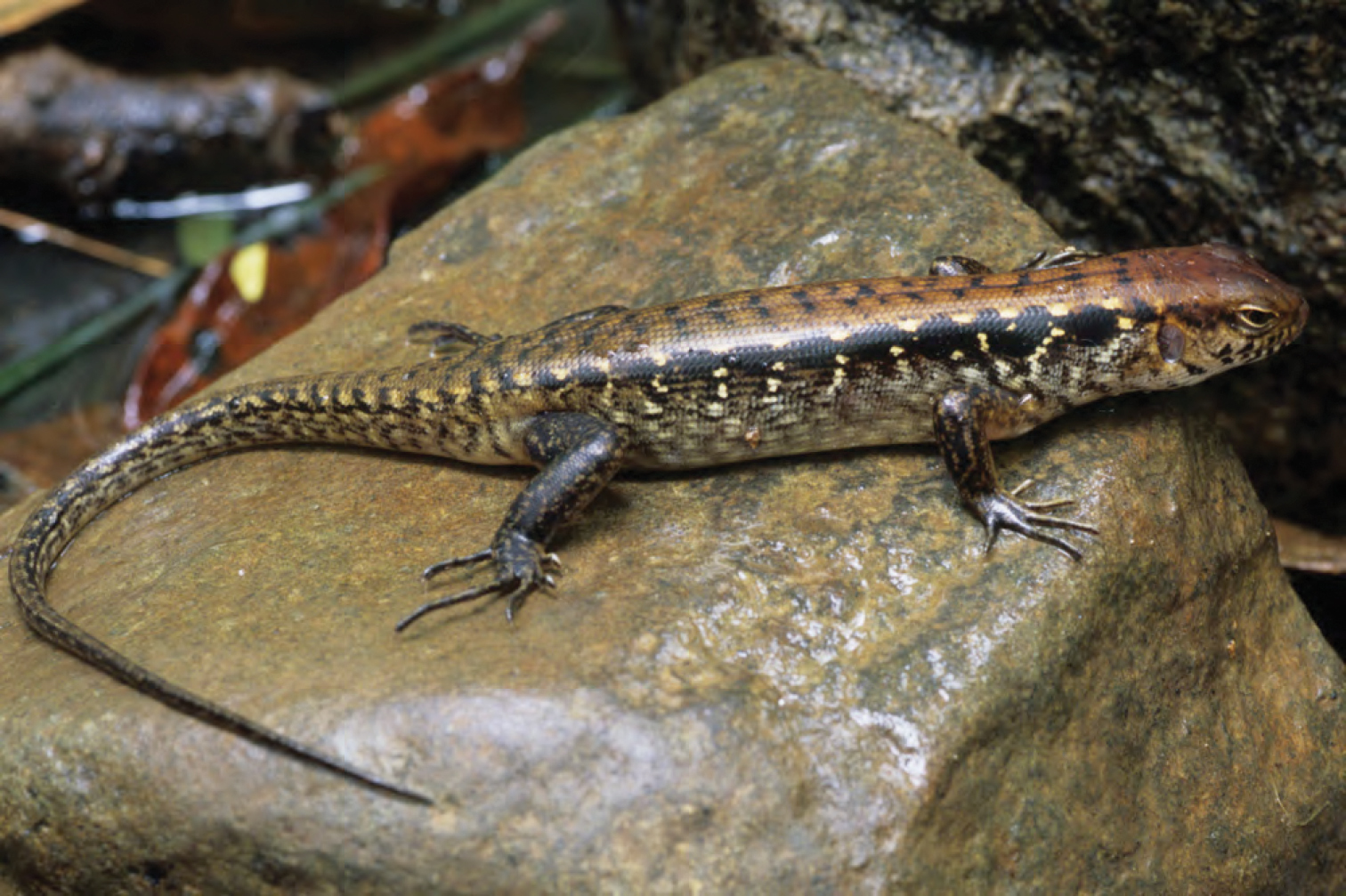

Conservation status
- Least Concern (IUCN 3.1)

Scientific classification
- Kingdom: Animalia
- Phylum: Chordata
- Class: Reptilia
- Order: Squamata
- Family: Scincidae
- Genus: Otosaurus; Gray, 1845
- Species: O. cumingii

Binomial name
- Otosaurus cumingii Gray, 1845
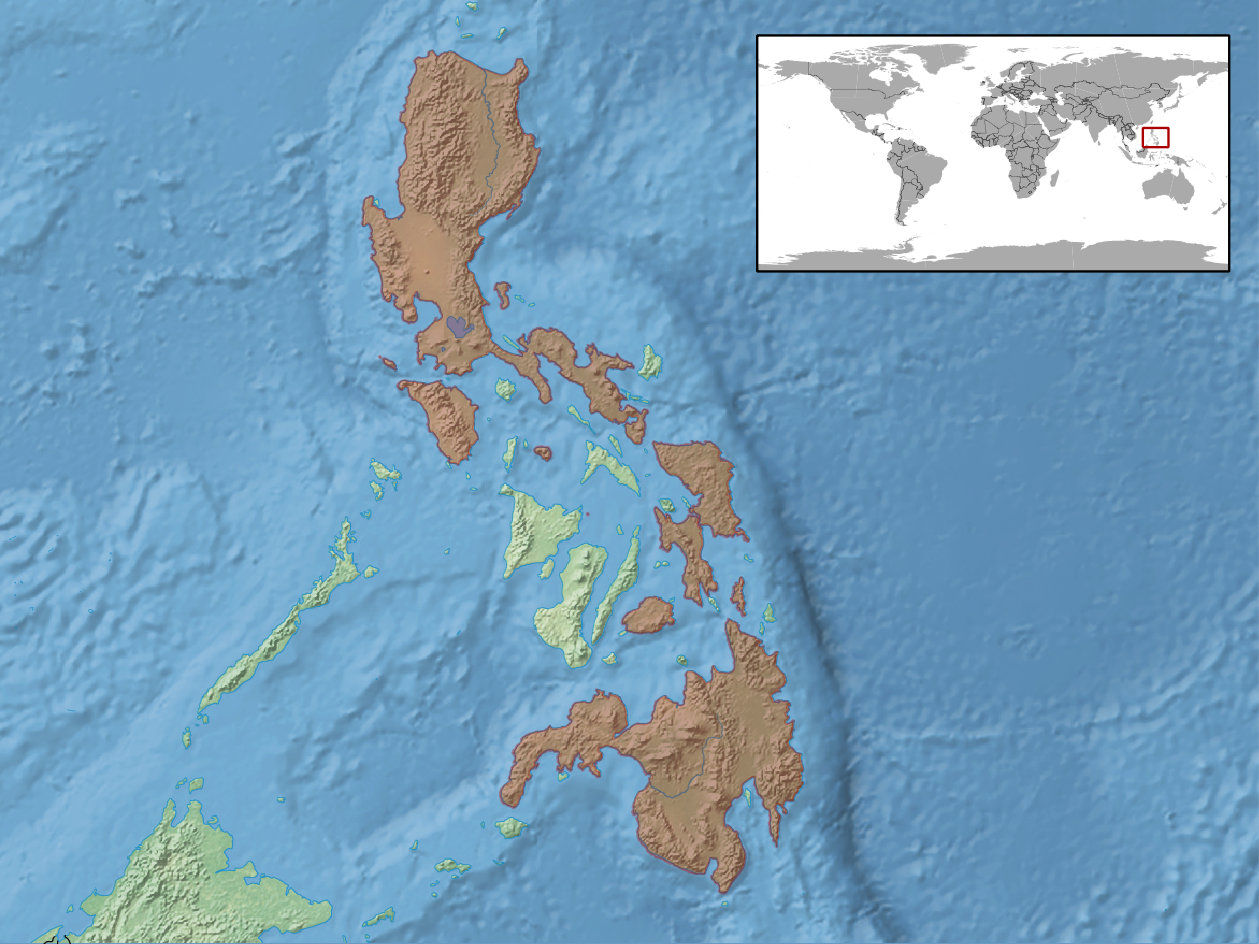
- Sphenomorphus cumingii distribution

Synonyms
- Otosaurus cumingii Gray, 1845; Euprepes otus W. Peters, 1867; Lygosoma cumingii — Boulenger, 1887; Otosaurus cumingii — Taylor, 1923; Sphenomorphus cumingi — Greer & F. Parker, 1967; Otosaurus cumingi — Linkem, Diesmos & R.M. Brown, 2011

= Otosaurus =

Species of lizard

Otosaurus cumingii, commonly called Cuming's sphenomorphus or the Luzon giant forest skink, is a species of skink, a lizard in the family Scincidae. The species is endemic to the Philippines.

== Etymology ==
The specific name, cumingii, is in honor of English naturalist Hugh Cuming.

== Habitat ==
O. cumingii is found up to 1,000 metres (3,300 ft) above sea level in the forests throughout most of the Philippines.

== Description ==
The Luzon giant forest skink reaches a total length (including tail) of 35 cm (14 inches).

== Behavior ==
O. cumingii tends to hide under leaves and logs.
