= A. johannae =

A. johannae may refer to:

- Abacetus johannae, a ground beetle
- Alopecoenas johannae, a synonym of Pampusana beccarii, the bronze ground dove, a bird found in New Guinea, the Bismarck Archipelago, and the Solomon Islands
- Alvania johannae, a sea snail found off the Canary Islands
- Amphiglossus johannae, a synonym of Flexiseps johannae, Johanna's skink, a lizard found in the Comoro Islands
