= Johannae =

Johannae may refer to:

- Abacetus johannae, species of ground beetle
- Alvania johannae, species of sea snail
- Cinnyris johannae, species of bird
- Coregonus johannae, species of fish
- Doryfera johannae, species of species of hummingbird
- Flexiseps johannae, species of skink
- Frea johannae, species of beetle
- Gluconacetobacter johannae, species of bacteria
- Odites johannae, species of moth
- Pampusana beccarii, species of bird
- Rasbora johannae, species of fish
- Tangara johannae, species of bird
