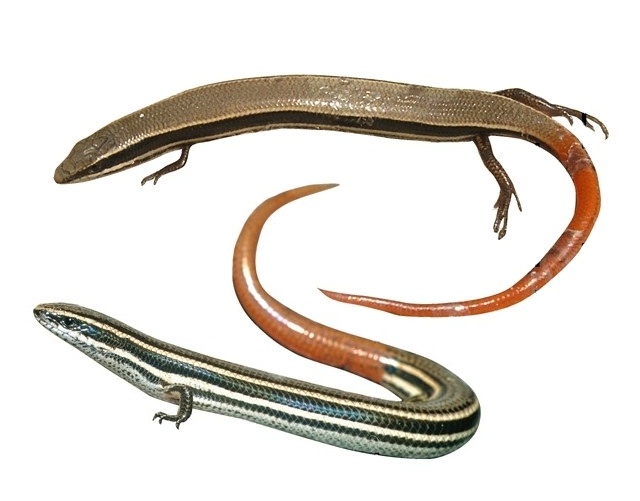
- Madascincus igneocaudatus

Scientific classification
- Kingdom: Animalia
- Phylum: Chordata
- Class: Reptilia
- Order: Squamata
- Family: Scincidae
- Subfamily: Scincinae
- Genus: Madascincus; Brygoo, 1981

Species
- 12 species, see text.

= Madascincus =

Genus of lizards

Madascincus is a genus of skinks, lizards in the family Scincidae. The genus is endemic to Madagascar. Some taxonomic authorities place the group in the genus Amphiglossus.

== Species ==
The following 12 species, listed alphabetically by specific name, are recognized as being valid:

- Madascincus ankodabensis (Angel, 1930) – Ankodabe skink
- Madascincus arenicola Miralles, J. Köhler, Glaw & Vences, 2011
- Madascincus igneocaudatus (Grandidier, 1867) – redtail skink
- Madascincus macrolepis (Boulenger, 1888) – rusty skink
- Madascincus melanopleura (Günther, 1877) – common Madagascar skink
- Madascincus miafina Miralles, J. Köhler, Glaw & Vences, 2016
- Madascincus minutus (Raxworthy & Nussbaum, 1993)
- Madascincus mouroundavae (Grandidier, 1872) – Morondava skink
- Madascincus nanus (Andreone & Greer, 2002)
- Madascincus polleni (Grandidier, 1869) – Madagascar coastal skink
- Madascincus pyrurus Miralles, J. Köhler, Glaw & Vences, 2016
- Madascincus stumpffi (Boettger, 1882) – Stumpff's skink

Nota bene: A binomial authority in parentheses indicates that the species was originally described in a genus other than Madascincus.
