= Flexiseps =

Scientific classification
- Kingdom: Animalia
- Phylum: Chordata
- Class: Reptilia
- Order: Squamata
- Family: Scincidae
- Subfamily: Scincinae
- Genus: Flexiseps; Erens, Miralles, Glaw, Chatrou, & Vences, 2016

Species
- 15 sp., see text

Genus of lizards

Flexiseps is a genus of skinks. They are all endemic to Madagascar. Some taxonomic authorities place the group in the genus Amphiglossus.

== Species ==
The following 15 species, listed alphabetically by specific name, are recognized as being valid:

- Flexiseps alluaudi (Brygoo, 1981)
- Flexiseps andranovahensis (Angel, 1933) – Andranovaho skink
- Flexiseps ardouini (Mocquard, 1897) – yellow skink
- Flexiseps crenni (Mocquard, 1906)
- Flexiseps decaryi (Angel, 1930) – rock skink
- Flexiseps elongatus (Angel, 1933)
- Flexiseps johannae (Günther, 1880) – Johanna's skink
- Flexiseps mandokava Raxworthy & Nussbaum, 1993
- Flexiseps melanurus (Günther, 1877) – spotted skink
- Flexiseps meva Miralles, Raselimanana, Rakotomalala, Vences, & Vieites, 2011
- Flexiseps ornaticeps (Boulenger, 1896) – grey skink
- Flexiseps stylus Andreone & Greer, 2002
- Flexiseps tanysoma Andreone & Greer, 2002
- Flexiseps tsaratananensis (Brygoo, 1981) – Tsaratanana skink
- Flexiseps valhallae (Boulenger, 1909)

Nota bene: A binomial authority in parentheses indicates that the species was originally described in a genus other than Flexiseps.
