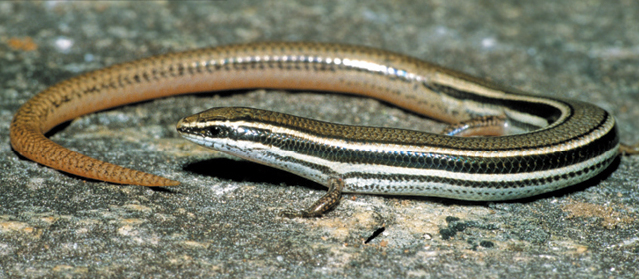

Scientific classification
- Kingdom: Animalia
- Phylum: Chordata
- Class: Reptilia
- Order: Squamata
- Family: Scincidae
- Genus: Madascincus
- Species: M. pyrurus

Binomial name
- Madascincus pyrurus Miralles, J. Köhler, Glaw & Vences, 2016

= Madascincus pyrurus =

Species of reptile

Madascincus pyrurus is an extant species of skink, a lizard in the family Scincidae. The species is endemic to Madagascar.
