= Paragehyra =

Scientific classification
- Kingdom: Animalia
- Phylum: Chordata
- Class: Reptilia
- Order: Squamata
- Suborder: Gekkota
- Family: Gekkonidae
- Subfamily: Uroplatinae
- Genus: Paragehyra; Angel, 1929

Species
- Four, see text.
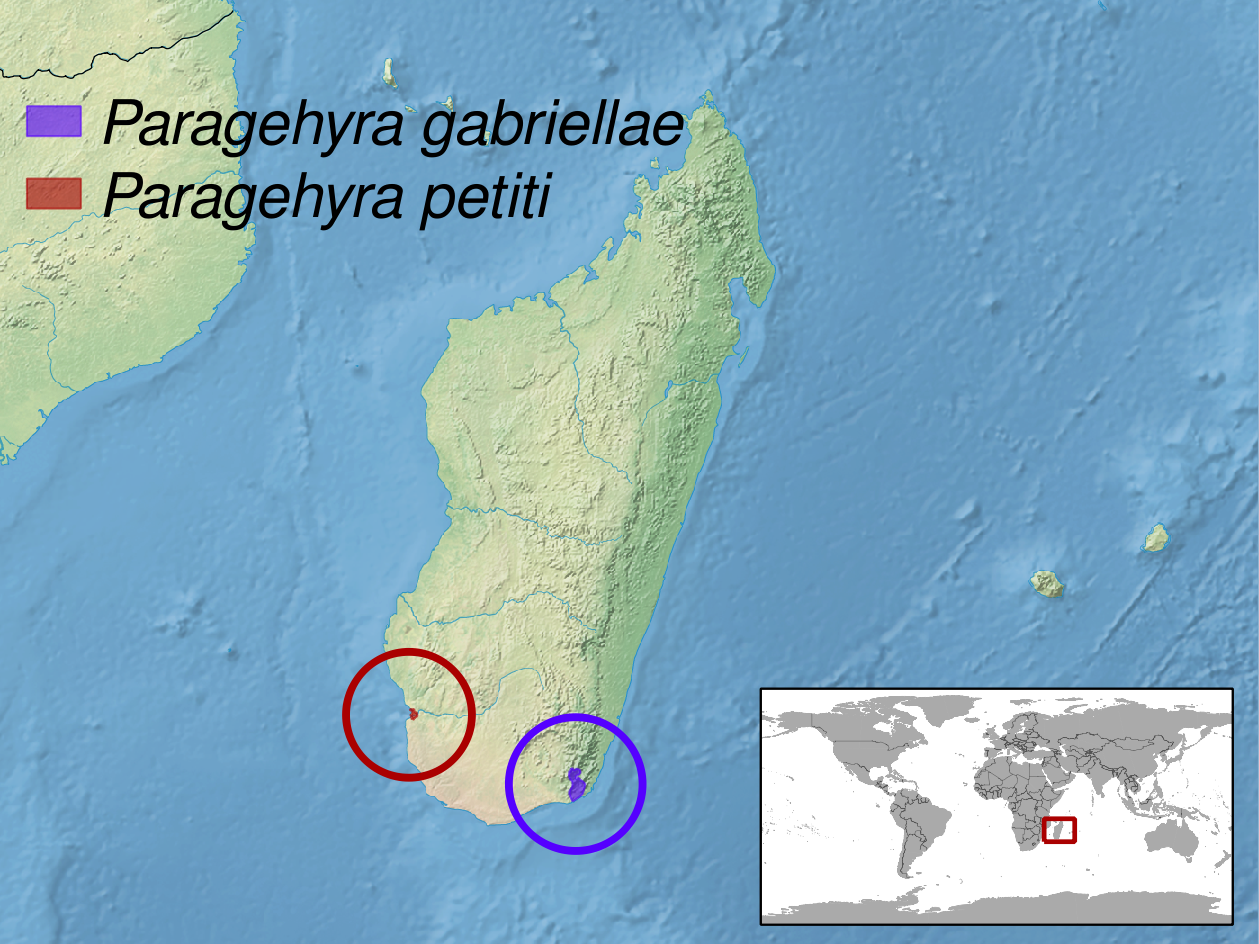

Genus of reptiles

Paragehyra is a genus of lizards in the family Gekkonidae (geckos). The genus is endemic to Madagascar.

== Species ==
The genus Paragehyra contains the following species.

- Paragehyra austini Crottini, Harris, Miralles, Glaw, Jenkins, Randrianantoandro, Bauer & Vences, 2014
- Paragehyra felicitae Crottini, Harris, Miralles, Glaw, Jenkins, Randrianantoandro, Bauer & Vences, 2014
- Paragehyra gabriellae Raxworthy & Nussbaum, 1994
- Paragehyra petiti Angel, 1929 – Angel's petite gecko
- Paragehyra tsaranoro Belluardo, Piccoli, Lobón-Rovira, Alves, Rasoazanany, Andreone, Rosa & Crottini, 2025
