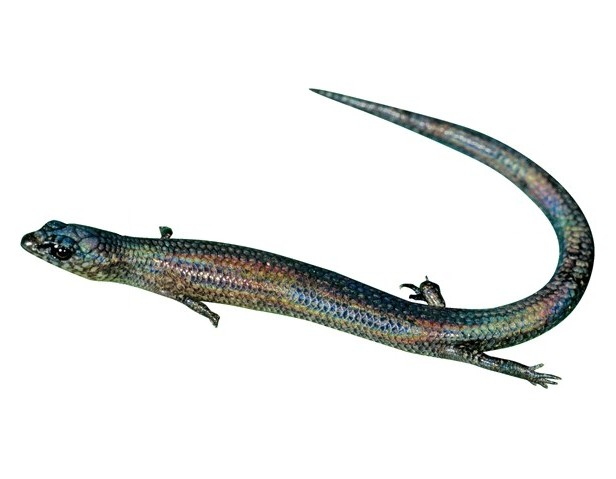

Conservation status
- Vulnerable (IUCN 3.1)

Scientific classification
- Kingdom: Animalia
- Phylum: Chordata
- Class: Reptilia
- Order: Squamata
- Family: Scincidae
- Genus: Madascincus
- Species: M. nanus

Binomial name
- Madascincus nanus Andreone & Greer, 2002

= Madascincus nanus =

Species of reptile

Madascincus nanus is a species of skink endemic to Madagascar.
