= Maracaiba zuliae =

Conservation status
- Least Concern (IUCN 3.1)

Scientific classification
- Kingdom: Animalia
- Phylum: Chordata
- Class: Reptilia
- Order: Squamata
- Family: Scincidae
- Genus: Maracaiba
- Species: M. zuliae

Binomial name
- Maracaiba zuliae (Miralles, Rivas, Bonillo, Schargel, Barros, García-Pérez & Barrio-Amorós, 2009)

Synonyms
- Mabuya zuliae Miralles et al., 2009; Maracaiba zuliae — Hedges & Conn, 2012

Species of lizard

Maracaiba zuliae is a species of skink, a lizard in the family Scincidae. The species is native to northwestern South America.

== Etymology ==
The specific name, zuliae, refers to the Venezuelan state of Zulia.

== Geographic range ==
M. zuliae is found in Venezuela and Colombia.

== Habitat ==
The preferred natural habitat of M. zuliae is forest, at altitudes from sea level to 1,500 m (4,900 ft).

== Reproduction ==
The mode of reproduction of M. zuliae is unknown.
