= Flexiseps tsaratananensis =

Conservation status
- Least Concern (IUCN 3.1)

Scientific classification
- Domain: Eukaryota
- Kingdom: Animalia
- Phylum: Chordata
- Class: Reptilia
- Order: Squamata
- Family: Scincidae
- Genus: Flexiseps
- Species: F. tsaratananensis

Binomial name
- Flexiseps tsaratananensis (Brygoo, 1981)
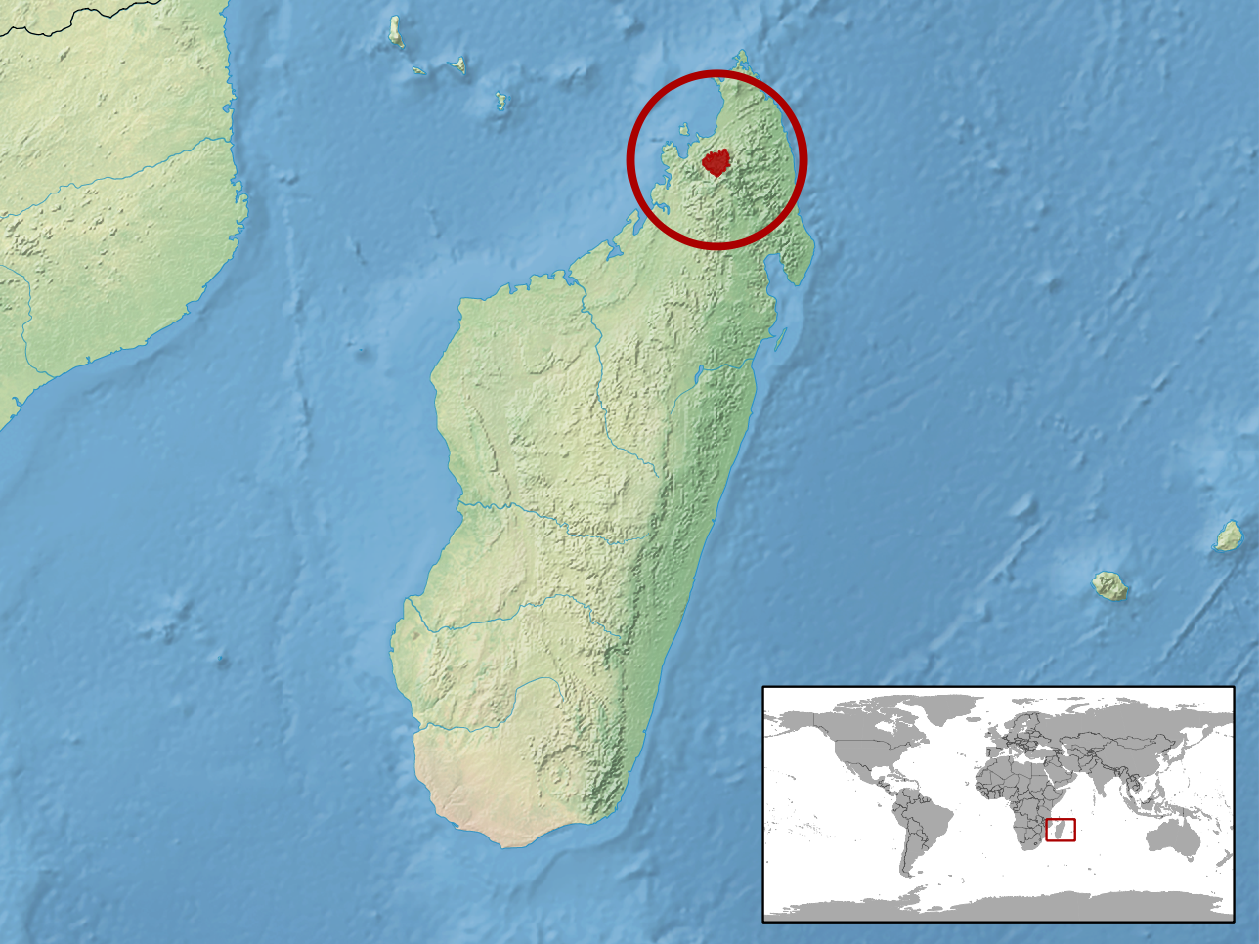

Synonyms
- Amphiglossus tsaratananensis

Species of lizard

The Tsaratanan skink (Flexiseps tsaratananensis) is a species of skink endemic to Madagascar.
