= Angel's petite gecko =

Conservation status
- Vulnerable (IUCN 3.1)

Scientific classification
- Kingdom: Animalia
- Phylum: Chordata
- Class: Reptilia
- Order: Squamata
- Suborder: Gekkota
- Family: Gekkonidae
- Genus: Paragehyra
- Species: P. petiti

Binomial name
- Paragehyra petiti Angel, 1929
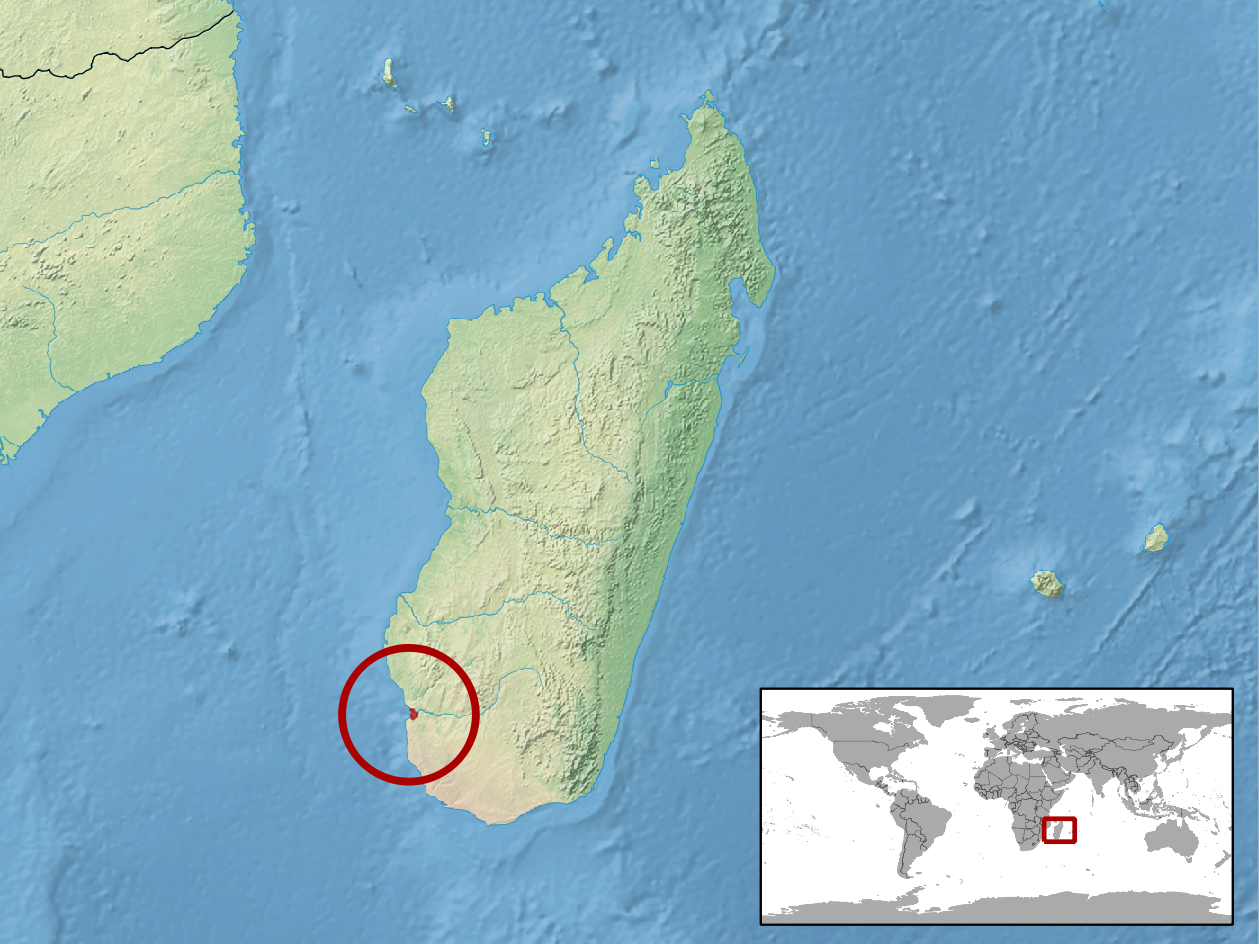

Species of lizard

Angel's petite gecko (Paragehyra petiti) is a species of lizard in the family Gekkonidae. The species is endemic to Madagascar.

== Etymology ==
The specific name, petiti, is in honor of French ornithologist Louis Petit fils (1856-1943).

== Geographic distribution ==
Paragehyra petiti is found in southwestern Madagascar, in the area that was formerly called Toliara Province.

== Habitat ==
The preferred habitats of Paragehyra petiti are forest and rocky areas at altitudes near sea level.

== Behavior ==
Paragehyra petiti is terrestrial and nocturnal.

== Reproduction ==
Paragehyra petiti is oviparous.
