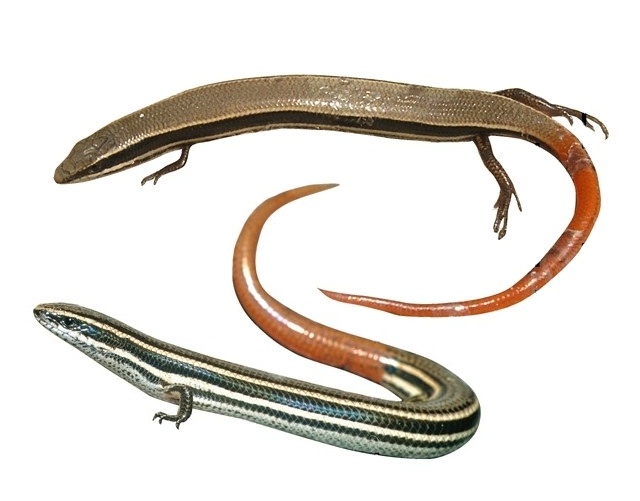

Conservation status
- Least Concern (IUCN 3.1)

Scientific classification
- Kingdom: Animalia
- Phylum: Chordata
- Class: Reptilia
- Order: Squamata
- Family: Scincidae
- Genus: Madascincus
- Species: M. igneocaudatus

Binomial name
- Madascincus igneocaudatus (Grandidier, 1867)

= Madascincus igneocaudatus =

Species of reptile

The redtail skink (Madascincus igneocaudatus) is an extant species of skink, a lizard in the family Scincidae. The species is endemic to Madagascar.
