= Paragehyra felicitae =

Scientific classification
- Kingdom: Animalia
- Phylum: Chordata
- Class: Reptilia
- Order: Squamata
- Suborder: Gekkota
- Family: Gekkonidae
- Genus: Paragehyra
- Species: P. felicitae

Binomial name
- Paragehyra felicitae Crottini, Harris, Miralles, Glaw, Jenkins, Randrianantoandro, Bauer & Vences, 2014

Species of lizard

Paragehyra felicitae is a species of lizard in the family Gekkonidae. The species is endemic to Madagascar.

== Etymology ==
The specific name, felicitae, is in honor of "Dr. Felicity O'Malley".

== Geographic distribution ==
Paragehyra felicitae is found in southcentral Madagascar, in the area that was formerly called Fianarantsoa Province.
