= Marisora aquilonaria =

Scientific classification
- Kingdom: Animalia
- Phylum: Chordata
- Class: Reptilia
- Order: Squamata
- Family: Scincidae
- Genus: Marisora
- Species: M. aquilonaria

Binomial name
- Marisora aquilonaria McCranie, Matthews, & Hedges, 2020

Species of lizard

Marisora aquilonaria, the Southern Sierra Madre skink, is a species of skink found in Mexico.
