= Marisora berengerae =

Conservation status
- Least Concern (IUCN 3.1)

Scientific classification
- Kingdom: Animalia
- Phylum: Chordata
- Class: Reptilia
- Order: Squamata
- Family: Scincidae
- Genus: Marisora
- Species: M. berengerae

Binomial name
- Marisora berengerae (Miralles, 2006)

Synonyms
- Mabuya berengerae Miralles, 2006; Alinea berengerae — Hedges & Conn, 2012; Marisora berengerae — Pinto-Sánchez et al., 2015

Species of lizard

Marisora berengerae, also known commonly as the San Andrés mabuya and the San Andrés skink, is a species of lizard in the family Scincidae. The species is endemic to San Andrés, an island in the southwestern Caribbean.

== Etymology ==
The specific name, berengerae, is in honor of Bérengère Miralles who is the wife Aurélien Miralles, the describer of this species.

== Habitat ==
The preferred natural habitat of M. berengerae is forest, at altitudes from sea level to 80 m (260 ft).

== Behavior ==
M. berengerae is arboreal and has been found high in palms and other trees.

== Reproduction ==
M. berengerae is viviparous.
