= Flexiseps elongatus =

Conservation status
- Data Deficient (IUCN 3.1)

Scientific classification
- Domain: Eukaryota
- Kingdom: Animalia
- Phylum: Chordata
- Class: Reptilia
- Order: Squamata
- Family: Scincidae
- Genus: Flexiseps
- Species: F. elongatus

Binomial name
- Flexiseps elongatus (Angel, 1933)
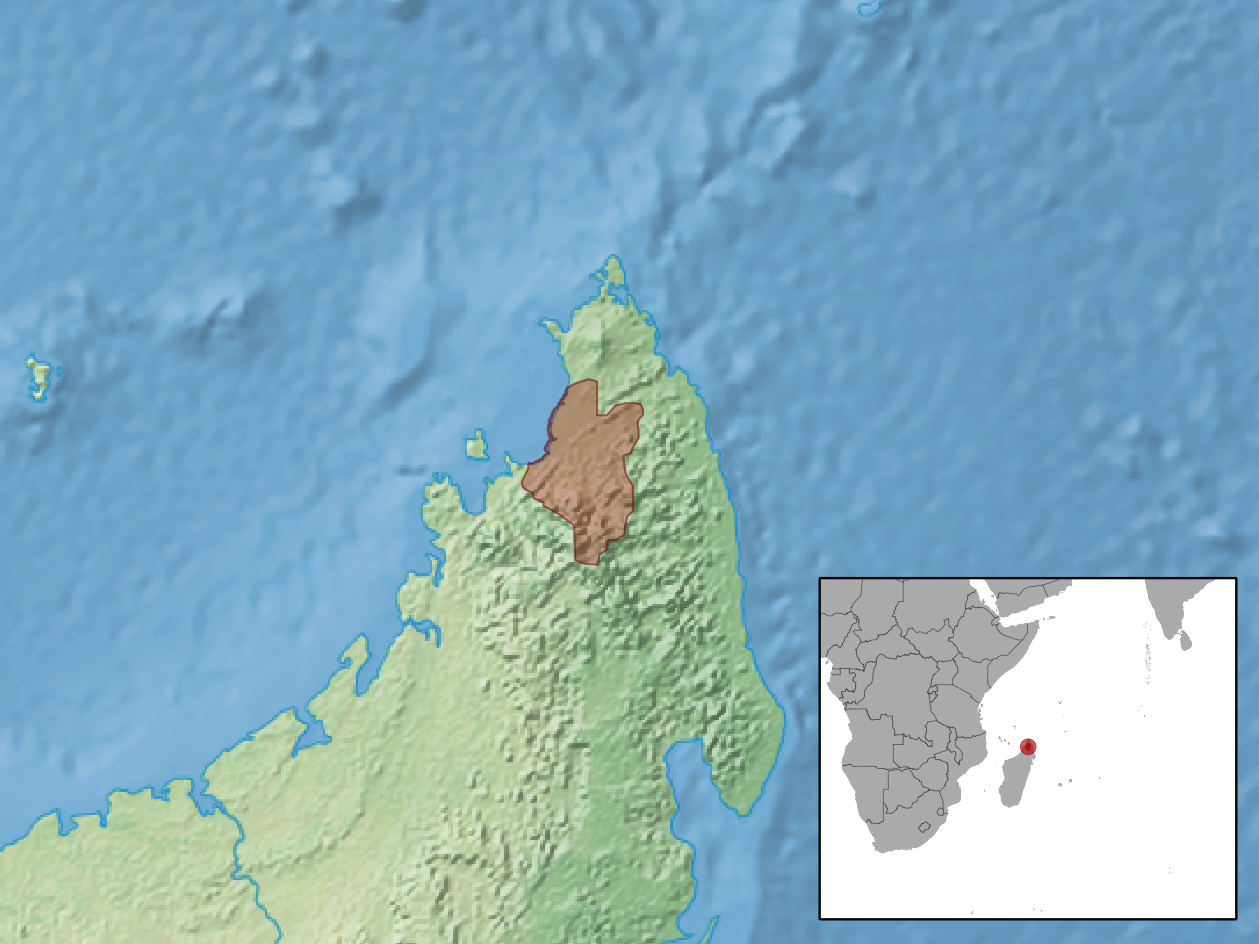

Synonyms
- Amphiglossus elongatus

Species of lizard

Flexiseps elongatus is a species of skink endemic to Madagascar.
