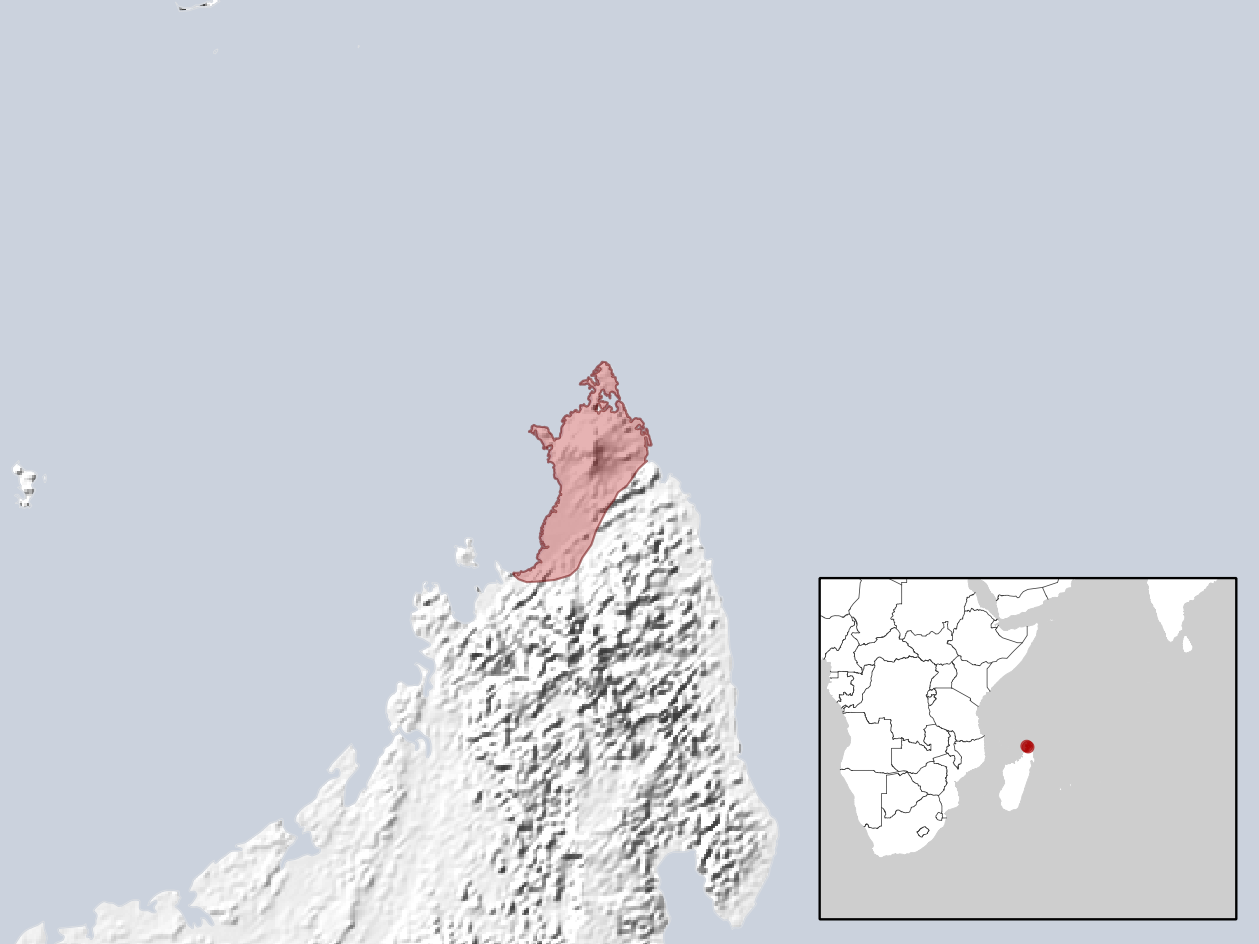
- Flexiseps ardouini habitat distribution

Conservation status
- Vulnerable (IUCN 3.1)

Scientific classification
- Kingdom: Animalia
- Phylum: Chordata
- Class: Reptilia
- Order: Squamata
- Family: Scincidae
- Genus: Flexiseps
- Species: F. ardouini

Binomial name
- Flexiseps ardouini (Mocquard, 1897)

Synonyms
- Sepsina ardouini Mocquard, 1897; Scelotes ardouini — Angel, 1930; Amphiglossus ardouini — Brygoo, 1983; Flexiseps ardouini — Erens et al., 2017

= Flexiseps ardouini =

Species of lizard

Flexiseps ardouini, also known commonly as the yellow skink, is a species of lizard in the family Scincidae. The species is endemic to Madagascar.

== Etymology ==
The specific name, ardouini, is in honor of French plant collector Léon Ardouin (1841–1909).

== Geographic range ==
F. ardouini is found in northwestern Madagascar.

== Habitat ==
The preferred natural habitat of F. ardouini is dry forest.

== Reproduction ==
The mode of reproduction of F. ardouini is unknown.
