= Flexiseps stylus =

Conservation status
- Data Deficient (IUCN 3.1)

Scientific classification
- Domain: Eukaryota
- Kingdom: Animalia
- Phylum: Chordata
- Class: Reptilia
- Order: Squamata
- Family: Scincidae
- Genus: Flexiseps
- Species: F. stylus

Binomial name
- Flexiseps stylus Andreone & Greer, 2002

Synonyms
- Amphiglossus stylus

Species of lizard

Flexiseps stylus is a species of skink endemic to Madagascar.
