= Marisora aurulae =

Conservation status
- Vulnerable (IUCN 3.1)

Scientific classification
- Kingdom: Animalia
- Phylum: Chordata
- Class: Reptilia
- Order: Squamata
- Suborder: Scinciformata
- Infraorder: Scincomorpha
- Family: Mabuyidae
- Genus: Marisora
- Species: M. aurulae

Binomial name
- Marisora aurulae Hedges & Conn, 2012

Species of lizard

Marisora aurulae, the Lesser Windward skink, is a species of skink found in St. Vincent and Tobago.
