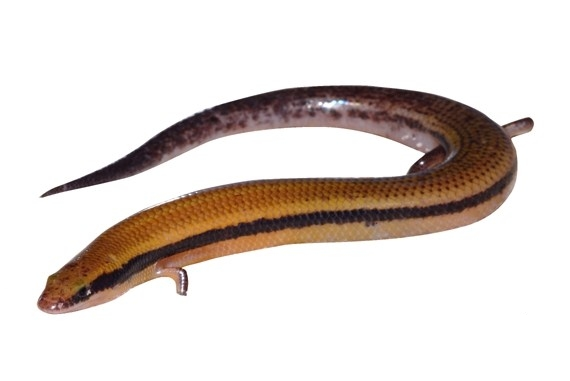

Conservation status
- Critically Endangered (IUCN 3.1)

Scientific classification
- Kingdom: Animalia
- Phylum: Chordata
- Class: Reptilia
- Order: Squamata
- Family: Scincidae
- Genus: Madascincus
- Species: M. arenicola

Binomial name
- Madascincus arenicola Miralles, J. Köhler, Glaw & Vences, 2011
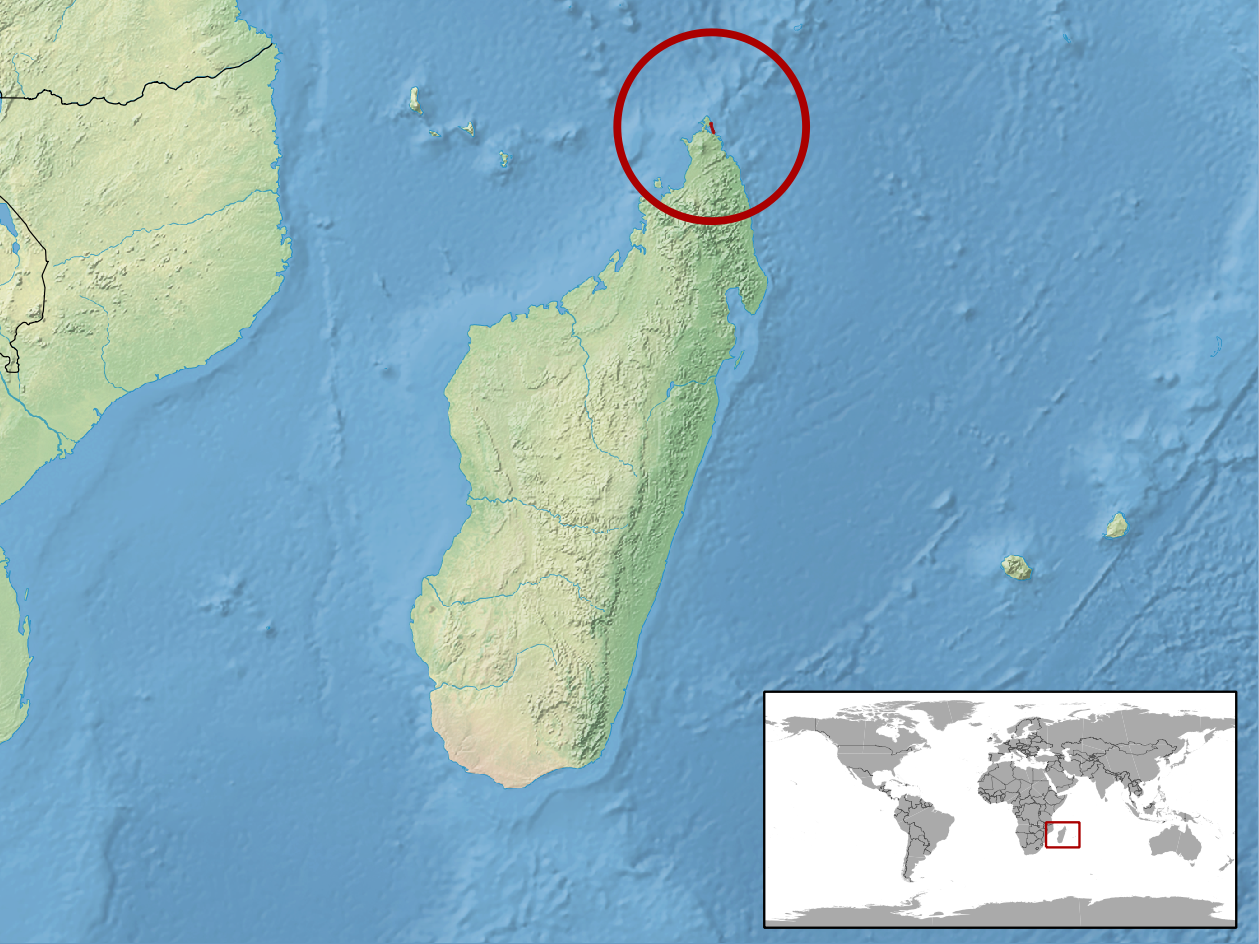

= Madascincus arenicola =

Species of lizard

Madascincus arenicola is an extant species of skink, a lizard in the family Scincidae. The species is endemic to Madagascar.

== Geographic range ==
M. arenicola is found in the Ampombofofo and Forêt d'Orangea regions of Antsiranana Province, in northern Madagascar.

== Habitat ==
The preferred habitats of M. arenicola are forest and shrubland at altitudes of 25–28 m (82–92 ft).
