= Flexiseps crenni =

Conservation status
- Least Concern (IUCN 3.1)

Scientific classification
- Kingdom: Animalia
- Phylum: Chordata
- Class: Reptilia
- Order: Squamata
- Family: Scincidae
- Genus: Flexiseps
- Species: F. crenni

Binomial name
- Flexiseps crenni (Mocquard, 1906)
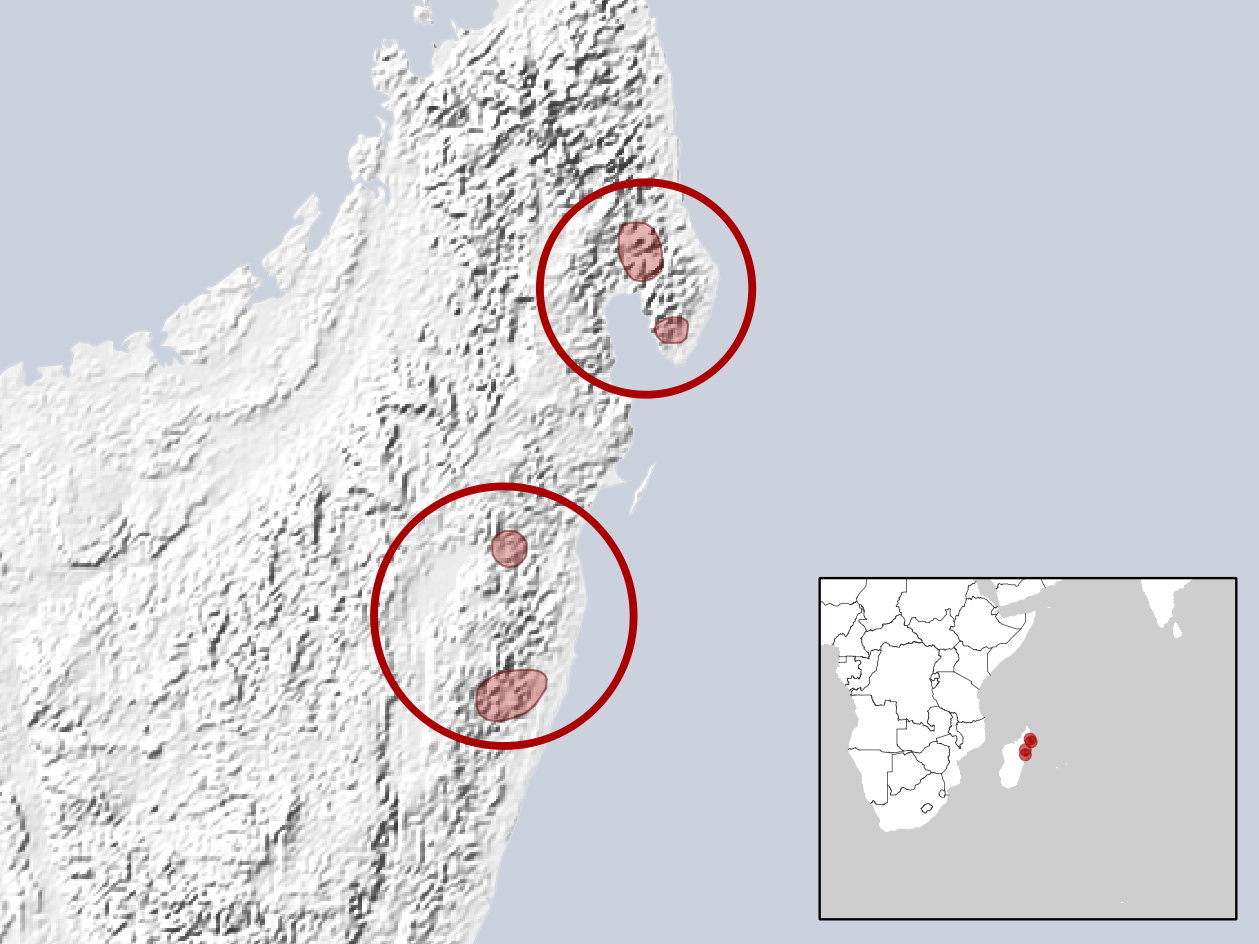

Synonyms
- Sepsina crenni Mocquard, 1906; Scelotes crenni — Angel, 1942; Androngo crenni — Brygoo, 1981; Amphiglossus crenni — Andreone & Greer, 2002; Flexiseps crenni — Erens et al., 2017

Species of lizard

Flexiseps crenni is a species of skink, a lizard in the family Scincidae. The species is endemic to Madagascar.

== Etymology ==
The specific name, crenni, is in honor of ophthalmologist Louis Crenn, who presented the holotype to Mocquard.

== Habitat ==
The preferred natural habitat of F. crenni is forest.

== Description ==
F. crenni has very short legs with a reduced number of digits. Each front foot has 2–3 digits, and each back foot has 2–4 digits. The holotype has a snout-to-vent length (SVL) of 11.5 cm (4.5 in).

== Reproduction ==
The mode of reproduction of F. crenni is unknown.
