= Marisora pergravis =

Conservation status
- Least Concern (IUCN 3.1)

Scientific classification
- Kingdom: Animalia
- Phylum: Chordata
- Class: Reptilia
- Order: Squamata
- Suborder: Scinciformata
- Infraorder: Scincomorpha
- Family: Mabuyidae
- Genus: Marisora
- Species: M. pergravis

Binomial name
- Marisora pergravis (Barbour, 1921)

Synonyms
- Alinea pergravis

Species of lizard

The Providencia skink (Marisora pergravis) is a species of skink found on Providencia.
