= Flexiseps alluaudi =

Conservation status
- Vulnerable (IUCN 3.1)

Scientific classification
- Kingdom: Animalia
- Phylum: Chordata
- Class: Reptilia
- Order: Squamata
- Family: Scincidae
- Genus: Flexiseps
- Species: F. alluaudi

Binomial name
- Flexiseps alluaudi (Brygoo, 1981)
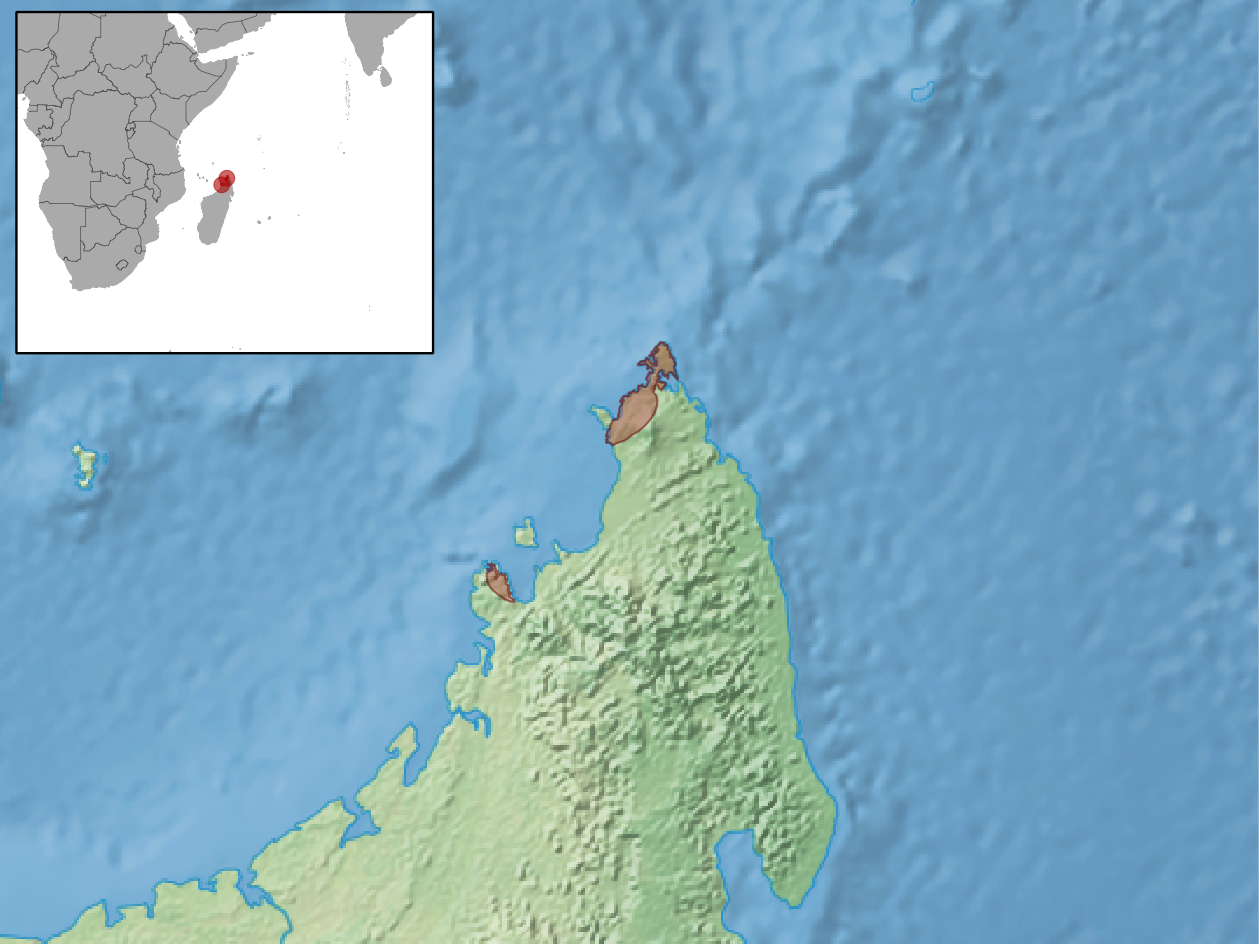

Synonyms
- Scelotes alluaudi Brygoo, 1981; Androngo allaudi [sic] — Raxworthy & Nussbaum, 1993 (ex errore); Androngo alluaudi – Glaw & Vences, 1994; Amphiglossus alluaudi — Andreone & Greer, 2002; Flexiseps alluaudi — Erens et al., 2017

Species of lizard

Flexiseps alluaudi is a species of skink, a lizard in the family Scincidae. The species is endemic to Madagascar.

== Etymology ==
The specific name, alluaudi, is in honor of French entomologist Charles Alluaud.

== Habitat ==
The preferred natural habitat of F. alluaudi is forest.

== Reproduction ==
The mode of reproduction of F. alluaudi is unknown.
