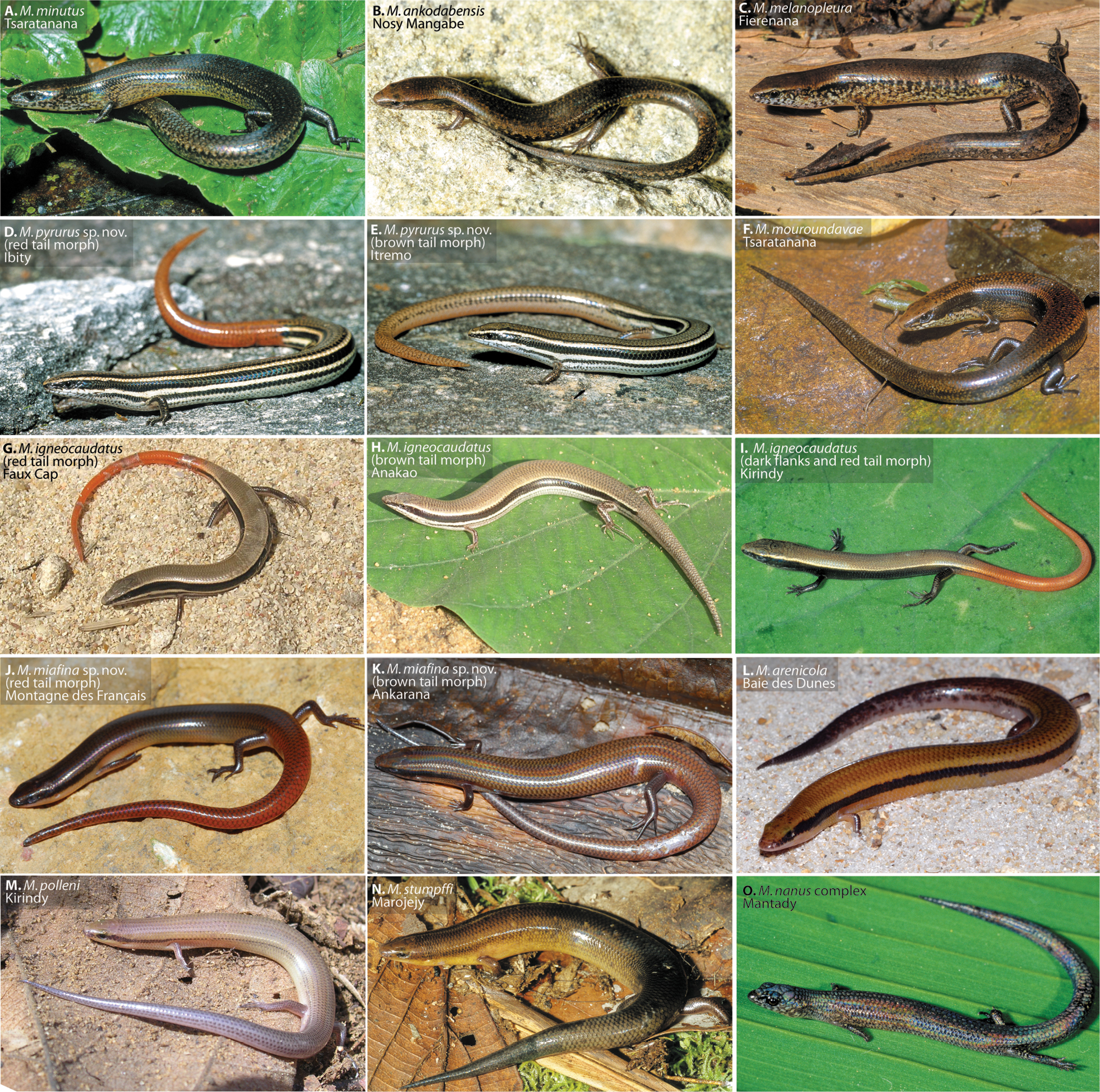
- Photographic plate showing most of the recognized species of Madascincus

Conservation status
- Endangered (IUCN 3.1)

Scientific classification
- Kingdom: Animalia
- Phylum: Chordata
- Class: Reptilia
- Order: Squamata
- Family: Scincidae
- Genus: Madascincus
- Species: M. macrolepis

Binomial name
- Madascincus macrolepis (Boulenger, 1888)

= Madascincus macrolepis =

Species of reptile

The rusty skink (Madascincus macrolepis) is an extant species of skink, a lizard in the family Scincidae. The species is endemic to Madagascar.
