= Flexiseps melanurus =

Conservation status
- Least Concern (IUCN 3.1)

Scientific classification
- Kingdom: Animalia
- Phylum: Chordata
- Class: Reptilia
- Order: Squamata
- Family: Scincidae
- Genus: Flexiseps
- Species: F. melanurus

Binomial name
- Flexiseps melanurus (Günther, 1877)

Synonyms
- Amphiglossus melanurus

Species of lizard

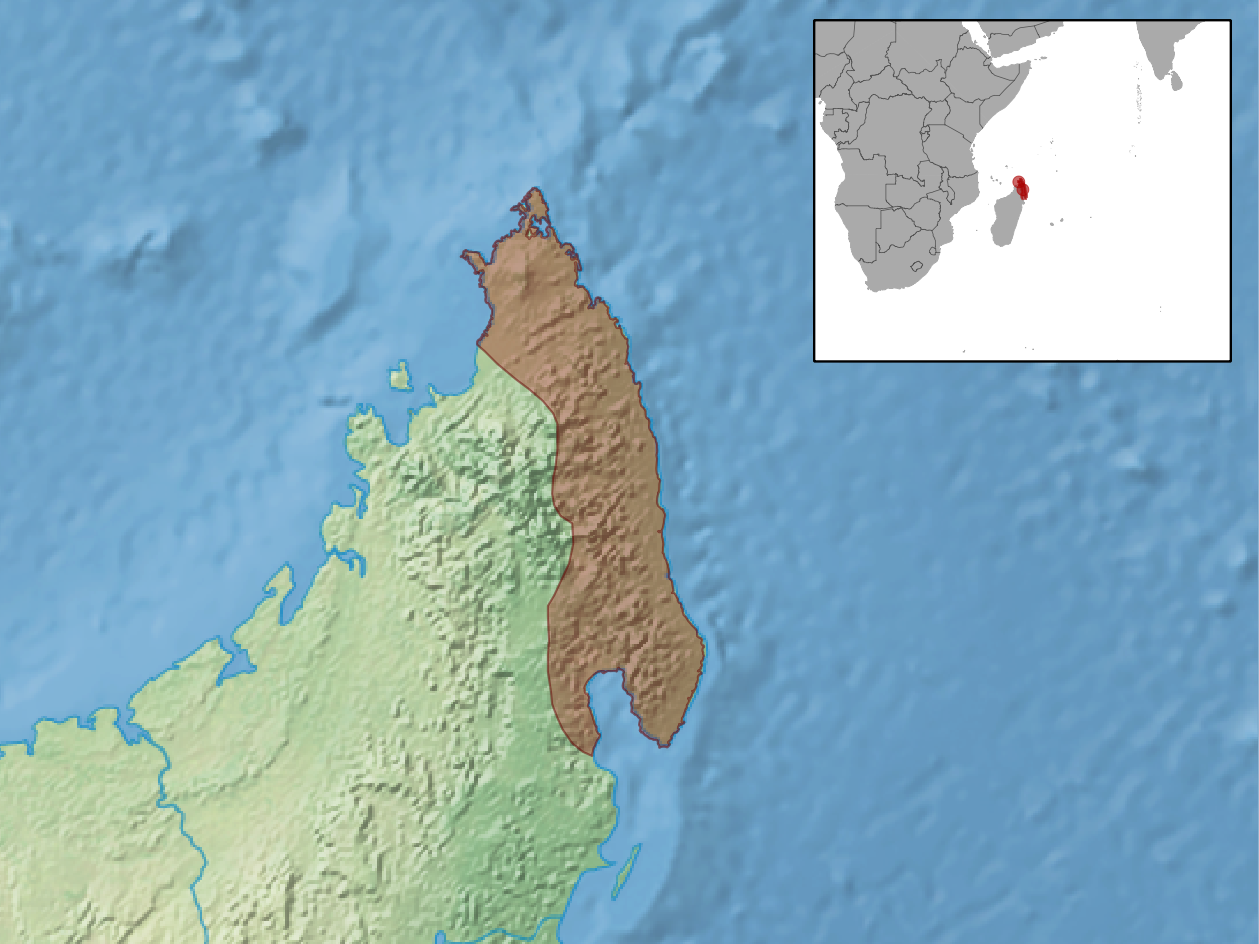
geographic distribution of Amphiglossus melanurus

The spotted skink (Flexiseps melanurus) is a species of skink endemic to Madagascar.
