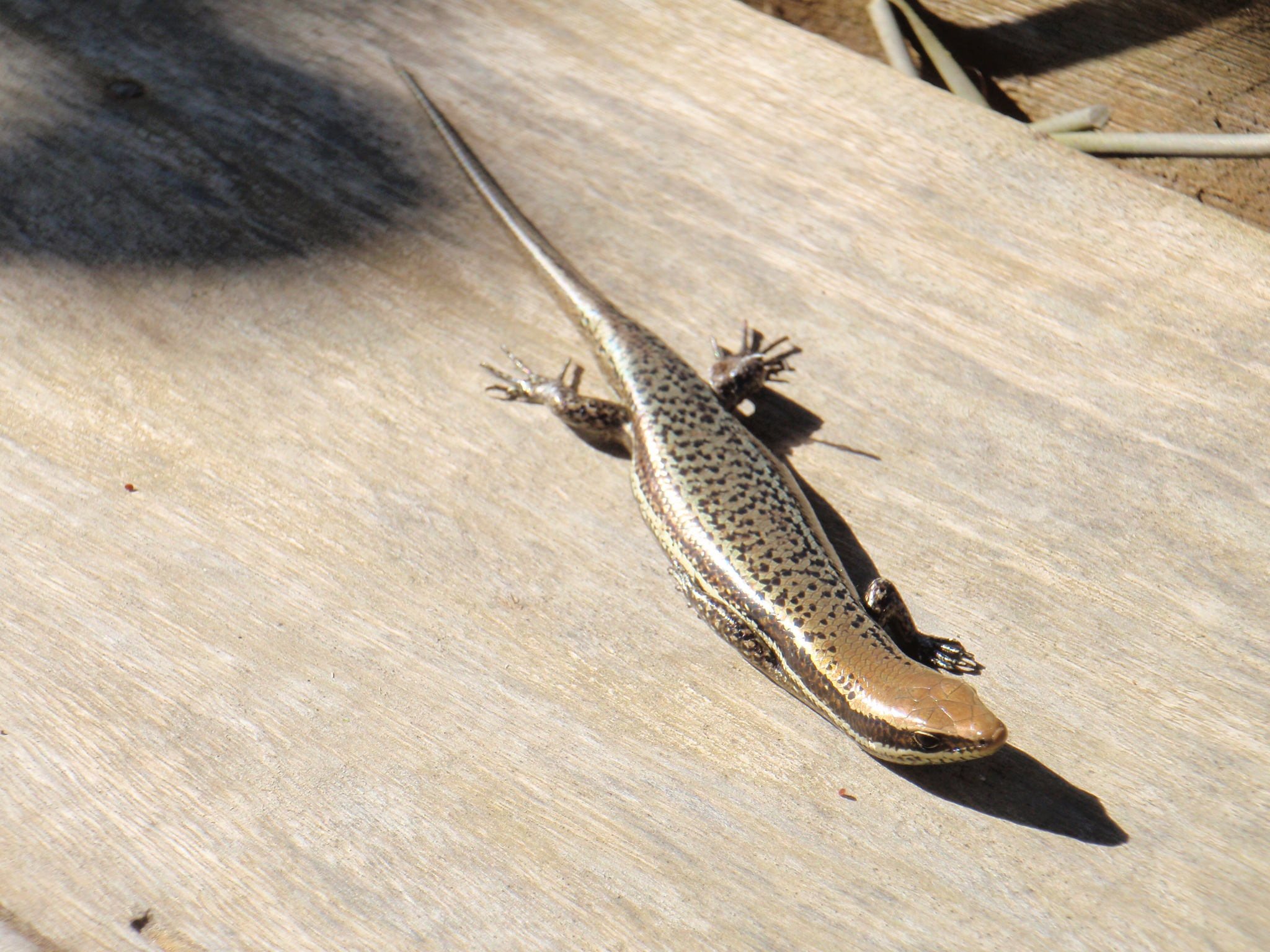

Conservation status
- Least Concern (IUCN 3.1)

Scientific classification
- Domain: Eukaryota
- Kingdom: Animalia
- Phylum: Chordata
- Class: Reptilia
- Order: Squamata
- Family: Scincidae
- Genus: Marisora
- Species: M. unimarginata

Binomial name
- Marisora unimarginata (Cope, 1862)

= Marisora unimarginata =

Species of lizard

The Central American mabuya (Marisora unimarginata) is a species of skink found in Costa Rica, Panama, and Nicaragua.
