= Flexiseps andranovahensis =

Conservation status
- Data Deficient (IUCN 3.1)

Scientific classification
- Domain: Eukaryota
- Kingdom: Animalia
- Phylum: Chordata
- Class: Reptilia
- Order: Squamata
- Family: Scincidae
- Genus: Flexiseps
- Species: F. andranovahensis

Binomial name
- Flexiseps andranovahensis (Angel, 1933)
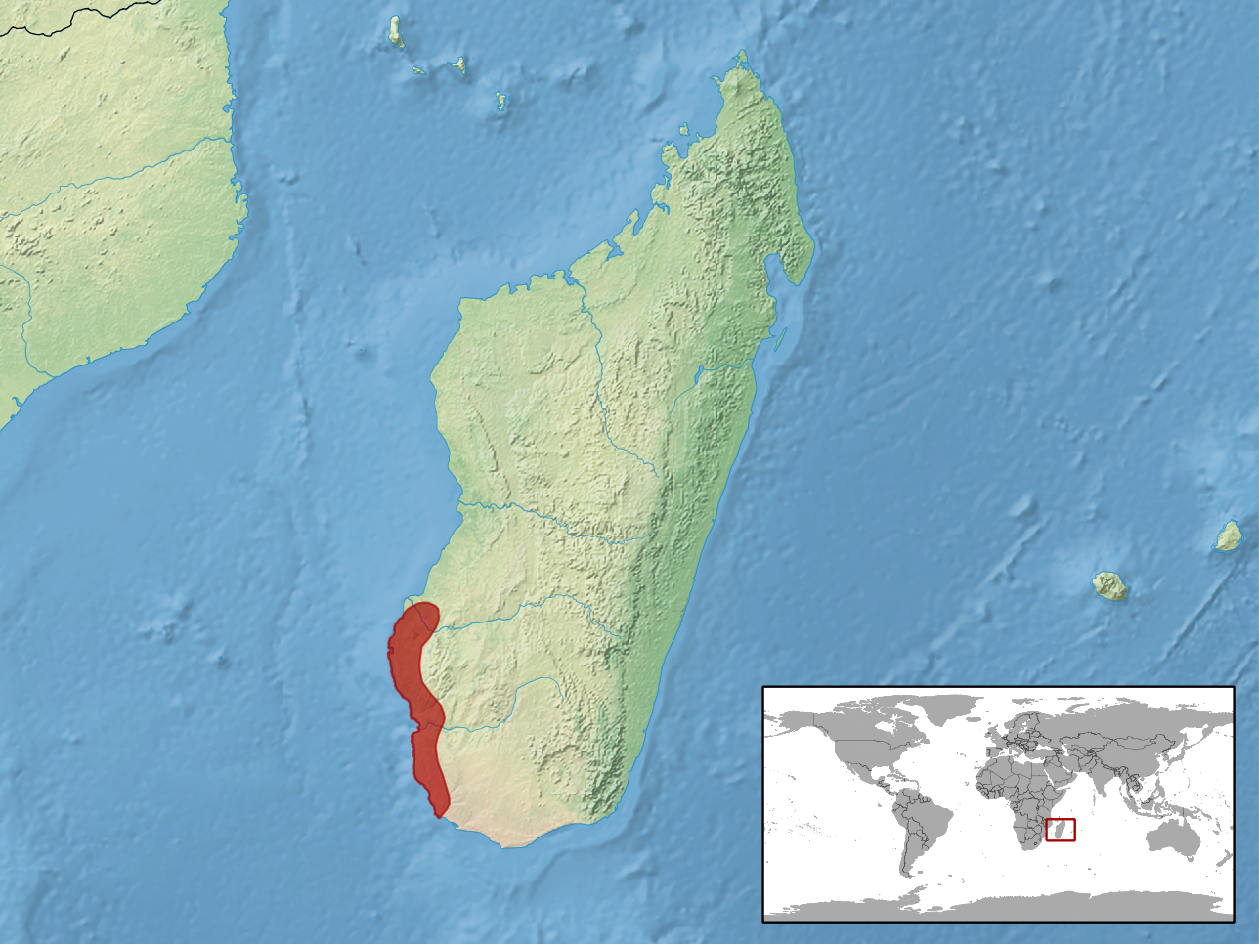

Synonyms
- Amphiglossus andranovahensis

Species of lizard

The Andranovaho skink (Flexiseps andranovahensis) is a species of skink endemic to Madagascar.
