= Paragehyra austini =

Scientific classification
- Kingdom: Animalia
- Phylum: Chordata
- Class: Reptilia
- Order: Squamata
- Suborder: Gekkota
- Family: Gekkonidae
- Genus: Paragehyra
- Species: P. austini

Binomial name
- Paragehyra austini Crottini, Harris, Miralles, Glaw, Jenkins, Randrianantoandro, Bauer & Vences, 2014

Species of lizard

Paragehyra austini is a species of lizard in the family Gekkonidae. The species is endemic to Madagascar.

== Etymology ==
The specific name, austini, is in honor of "Mr. Austin O'Malley".

== Geographic distribution ==
Paragehyra austini is found in Andohahela National Park in southeastern Madagascar.

== Habitat ==
The preferred natural habitat of Paragehyra austini is cave walls.
