= Maracaiba meridensis =

Conservation status
- Least Concern (IUCN 3.1)

Scientific classification
- Kingdom: Animalia
- Phylum: Chordata
- Class: Reptilia
- Order: Squamata
- Family: Scincidae
- Genus: Maracaiba
- Species: M. meridensis

Binomial name
- Maracaiba meridensis (Miralles, Rivas, & Schargel, 2005)

Species of lizard

Maracaiba meridensis is a species of skink found in Venezuela. It is a species of skink belonging to the family Scincidae, and the genus Maracaiba, which has distinctive anatomical features. The species is primarily found in northwestern Venezuela, particularly in the Cordillera de Mérida at elevations between 1,300 and 2,200 meters.
