= Marisora alliacea =

Conservation status
- Least Concern (IUCN 3.1)

Scientific classification
- Kingdom: Animalia
- Phylum: Chordata
- Class: Reptilia
- Order: Squamata
- Suborder: Scinciformata
- Infraorder: Scincomorpha
- Family: Mabuyidae
- Genus: Marisora
- Species: M. alliacea

Binomial name
- Marisora alliacea (Cope, 1875)

Species of lizard

Marisora alliacea is a species of skink found in Costa Rica and Nicaragua.
