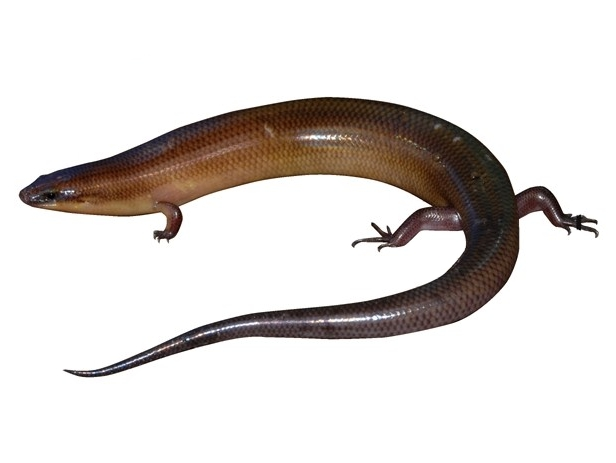

Conservation status
- Near Threatened (IUCN 3.1)

Scientific classification
- Kingdom: Animalia
- Phylum: Chordata
- Class: Reptilia
- Order: Squamata
- Family: Scincidae
- Genus: Madascincus
- Species: M. stumpffi

Binomial name
- Madascincus stumpffi (Boettger, 1882)
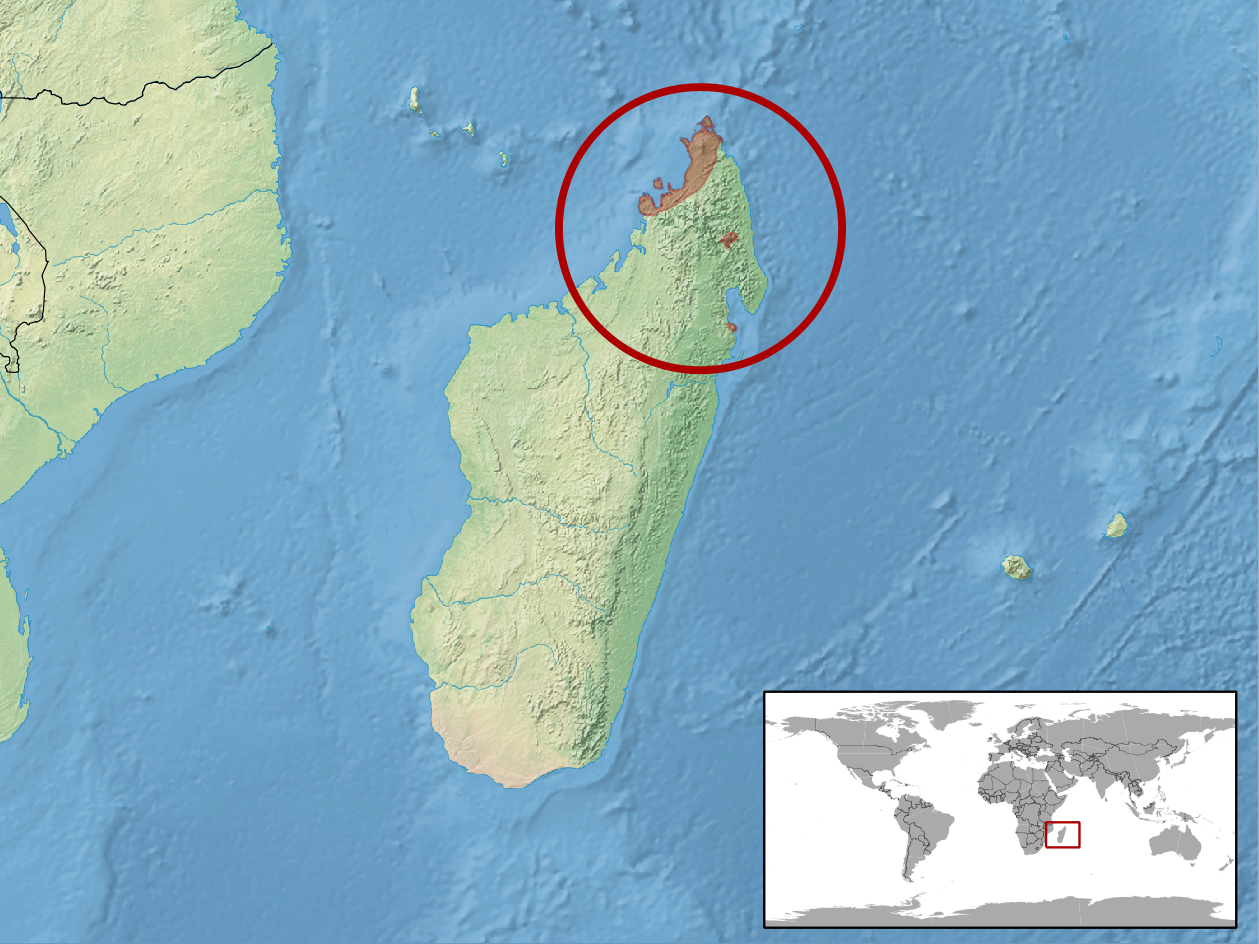

= Madascincus stumpffi =

Species of reptile

Stumpff's skink (Madascincus stumpffi) is an extant species of skink, a lizard in the family Scincidae. The species is endemic to Madagascar.
