= Flexiseps meva =

Conservation status
- Data Deficient (IUCN 3.1)

Scientific classification
- Kingdom: Animalia
- Phylum: Chordata
- Class: Reptilia
- Order: Squamata
- Family: Scincidae
- Genus: Flexiseps
- Species: F. meva

Binomial name
- Flexiseps meva Miralles, Raselimanana, Rakotomalala, Vences, & Vieites, 2011

Synonyms
- Amphiglossus meva

Species of lizard

Flexiseps meva is a species of skink endemic to Madagascar.
