= Marisora magnacornae =

Conservation status
- Data Deficient (IUCN 3.1)

Scientific classification
- Kingdom: Animalia
- Phylum: Chordata
- Class: Reptilia
- Order: Squamata
- Suborder: Scinciformata
- Infraorder: Scincomorpha
- Family: Mabuyidae
- Genus: Marisora
- Species: M. magnacornae

Binomial name
- Marisora magnacornae Hedges & Conn, 2012

Species of lizard

Marisora magnacornae, the Corn Island skink, is a species of skink found on Great Corn Island in Nicaragua.
