= Marisora lineola =

Scientific classification
- Kingdom: Animalia
- Phylum: Chordata
- Class: Reptilia
- Order: Squamata
- Family: Scincidae
- Genus: Marisora
- Species: M. lineola

Binomial name
- Marisora lineola McCranie, Matthews, & Hedges, 2020

Species of lizard

The Mayan skink (Marisora lineola) is a species of skink found in Guatemala, Mexico, and Belize.
