= Marisora urtica =

Scientific classification
- Kingdom: Animalia
- Phylum: Chordata
- Class: Reptilia
- Order: Squamata
- Family: Scincidae
- Genus: Marisora
- Species: M. urtica

Binomial name
- Marisora urtica McCranie, Matthews, & Hedges, 2020

Species of lizard

The Fonseca Islands skink (Marisora urtica) is a species of skink found in Honduras.
