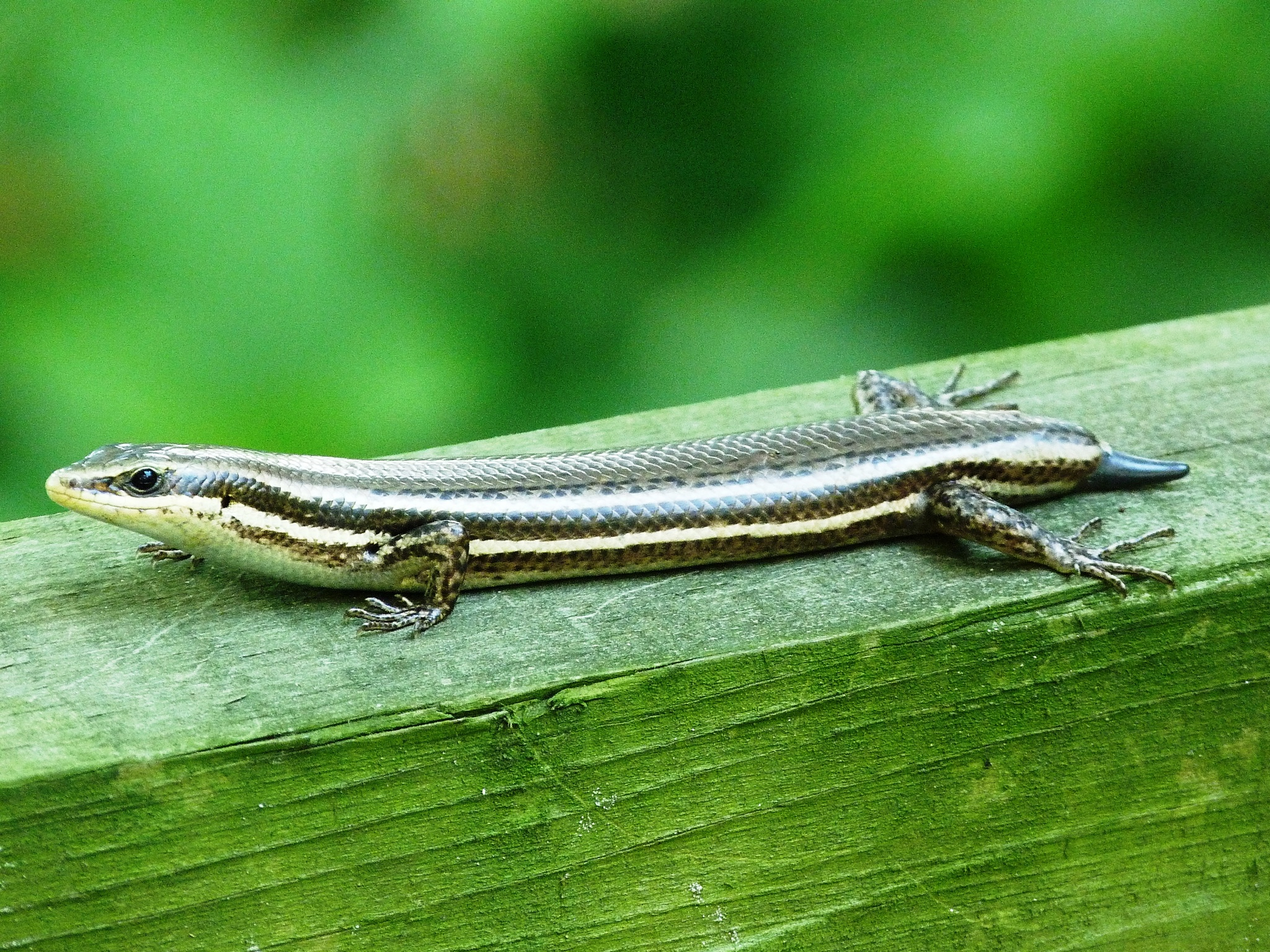
- In Honduras

Conservation status
- Critically Endangered (IUCN 3.1)

Scientific classification
- Kingdom: Animalia
- Phylum: Chordata
- Class: Reptilia
- Order: Squamata
- Suborder: Scinciformata
- Infraorder: Scincomorpha
- Family: Mabuyidae
- Genus: Marisora
- Species: M. roatanae

Binomial name
- Marisora roatanae Hedges & Conn, 2012

= Marisora roatanae =

Species of lizard

Marisora roatanae, the Honduran skink or Roatán skink, is a species of skink found on Roatán in Honduras.
