= Flexiseps decaryi =

Conservation status
- Endangered (IUCN 3.1)

Scientific classification
- Domain: Eukaryota
- Kingdom: Animalia
- Phylum: Chordata
- Class: Reptilia
- Order: Squamata
- Family: Scincidae
- Genus: Flexiseps
- Species: F. decaryi

Binomial name
- Flexiseps decaryi (Angel, 1930)
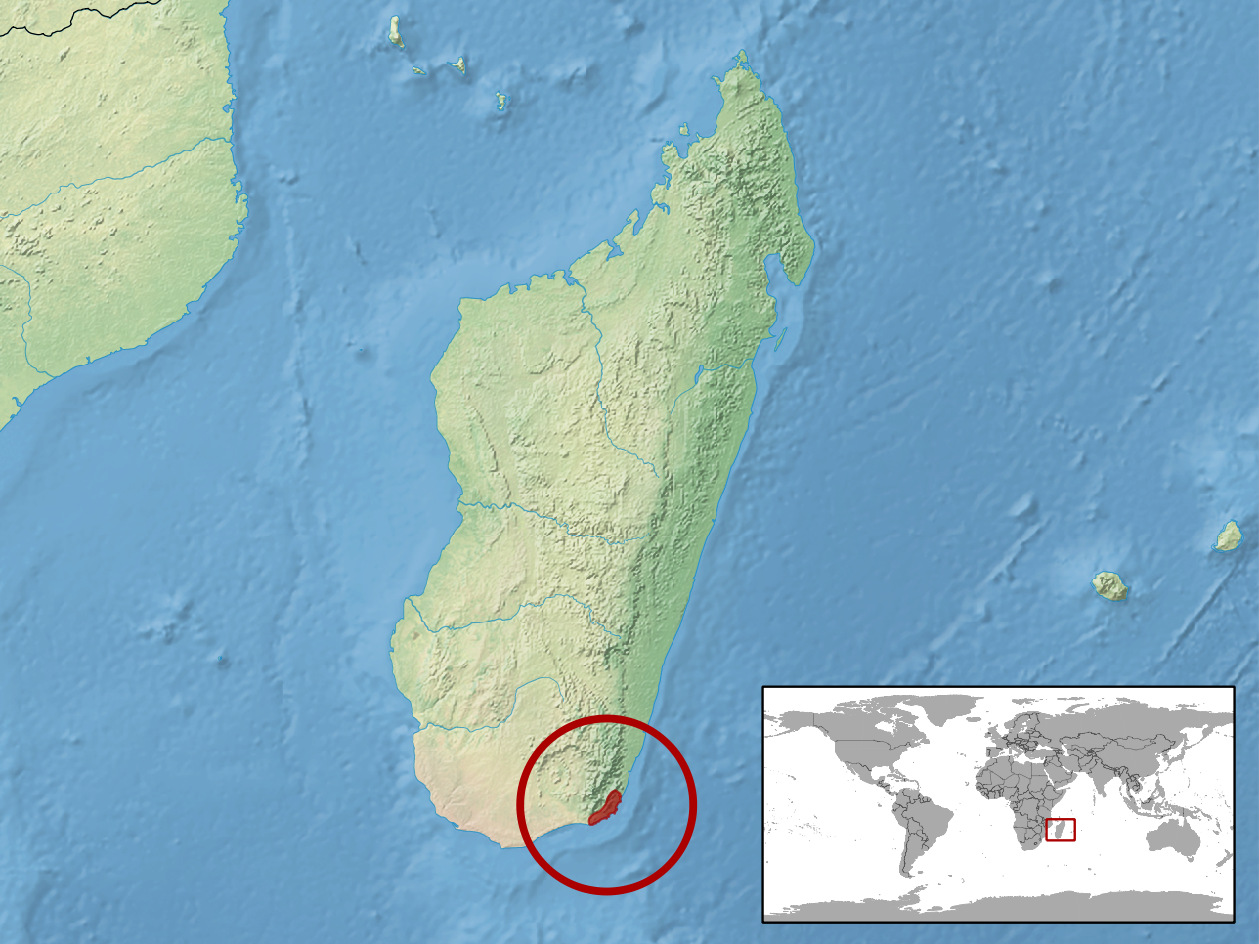

Synonyms
- Amphiglossus decaryi

Species of lizard

The rock skink (Flexiseps decaryi) is a species of skink endemic to Madagascar.
