= Uroplatus fiera =

Scientific classification
- Kingdom: Animalia
- Phylum: Chordata
- Class: Reptilia
- Order: Squamata
- Suborder: Gekkota
- Family: Gekkonidae
- Genus: Uroplatus
- Species: U. fiera

Binomial name
- Uroplatus fiera Ratsoavina, Ranjanaharisoa, Glaw, Raselimanana, Miralles, & Vences, 2015

Species of lizard

Uroplatus fiera is a species of lizard in the family Gekkonidae. It is endemic to Madagascar.
