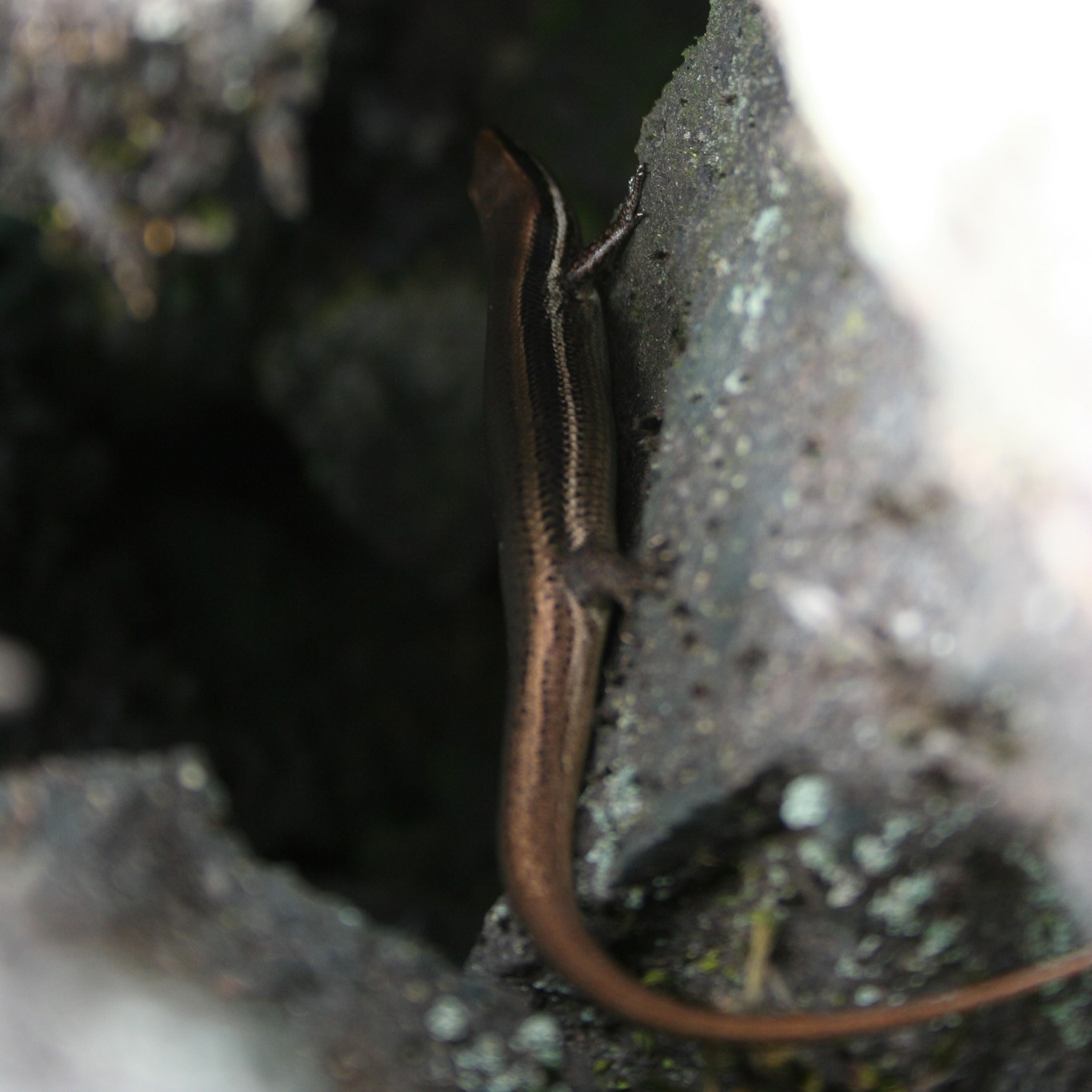

Conservation status
- Least Concern (IUCN 3.1)

Scientific classification
- Kingdom: Animalia
- Phylum: Chordata
- Class: Reptilia
- Order: Squamata
- Suborder: Scinciformata
- Infraorder: Scincomorpha
- Family: Mabuyidae
- Genus: Marisora
- Species: M. brachypoda

Binomial name
- Marisora brachypoda (Taylor, 1956)

= Marisora brachypoda =

Species of lizard

Marisora brachypoda is a species of skink found in Mexico and Central America.
