= Flexiseps valhallae =

Scientific classification
- Domain: Eukaryota
- Kingdom: Animalia
- Phylum: Chordata
- Class: Reptilia
- Order: Squamata
- Family: Scincidae
- Genus: Flexiseps
- Species: F. valhallae

Binomial name
- Flexiseps valhallae (Boulenger, 1909)

Synonyms
- Amphiglossus valhallae

Species of lizard

Flexiseps valhallae is a species of skink endemic to the Glorioso Islands.
