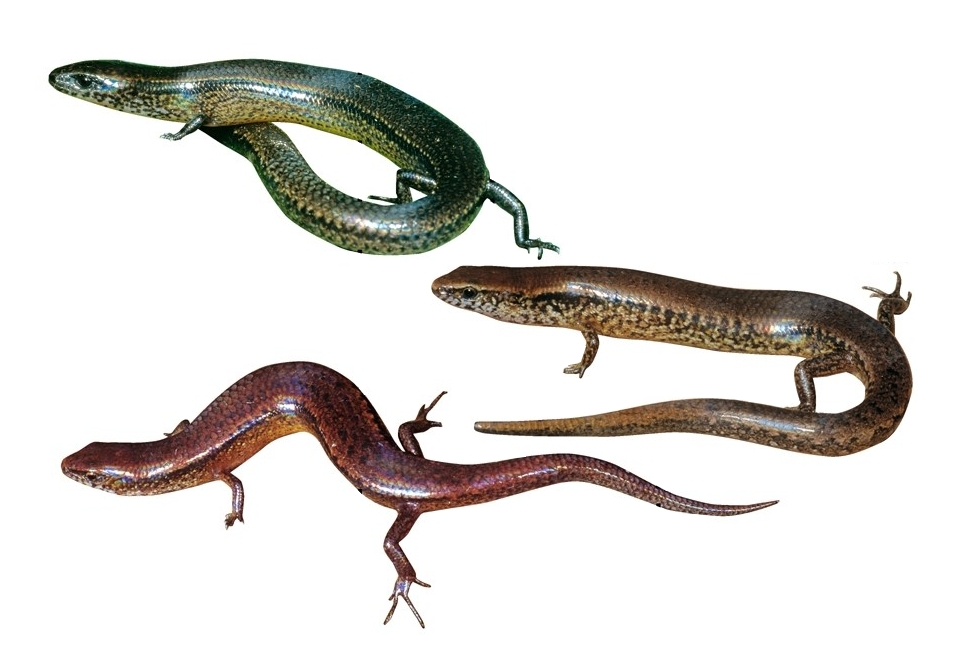

Conservation status
- Least Concern (IUCN 3.1)

Scientific classification
- Kingdom: Animalia
- Phylum: Chordata
- Class: Reptilia
- Order: Squamata
- Family: Scincidae
- Genus: Madascincus
- Species: M. melanopleura

Binomial name
- Madascincus melanopleura (Günther, 1877)
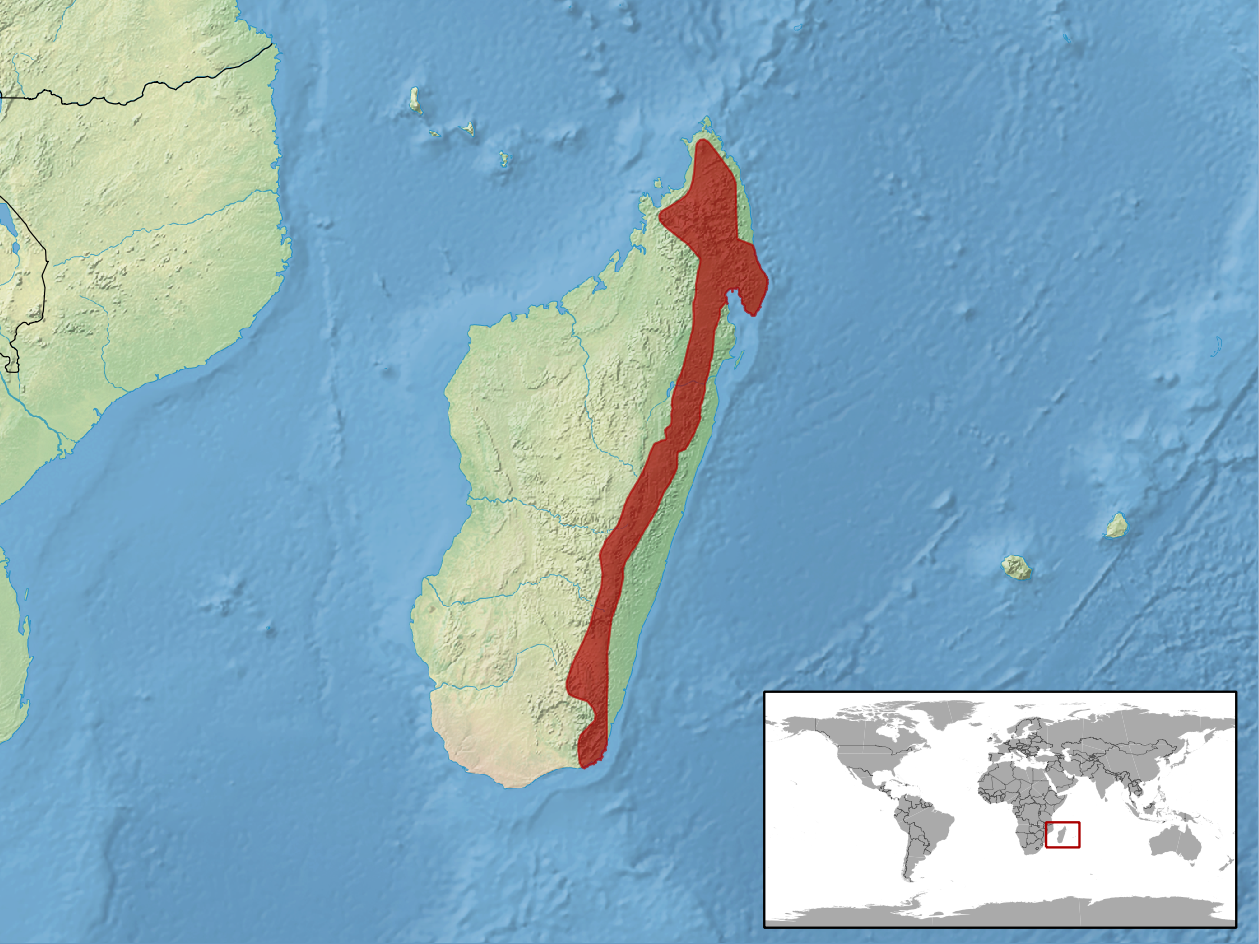

= Madascincus melanopleura =

Species of reptile

Madascincus melanopleura, also known as the common Madagascar skink, is a species of skink in the family Scincidae. The species is endemic to Madagascar.
