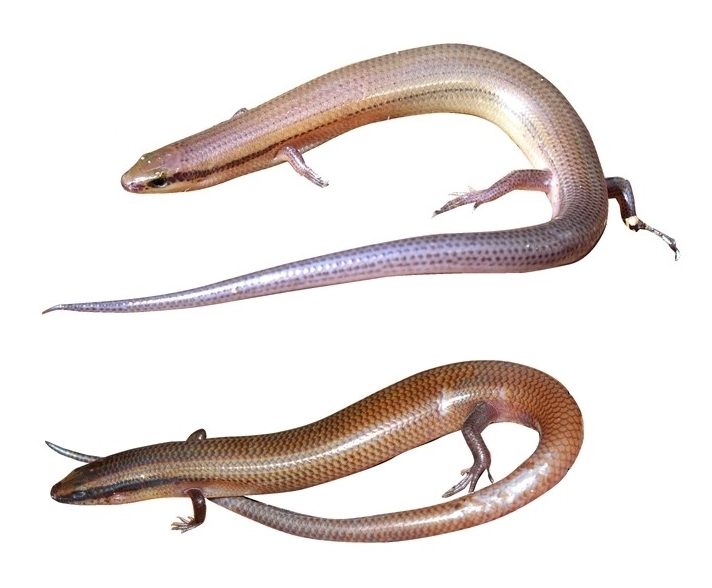

Conservation status
- Least Concern (IUCN 3.1)

Scientific classification
- Kingdom: Animalia
- Phylum: Chordata
- Class: Reptilia
- Order: Squamata
- Family: Scincidae
- Genus: Madascincus
- Species: M. polleni

Binomial name
- Madascincus polleni (Grandidier, 1869)
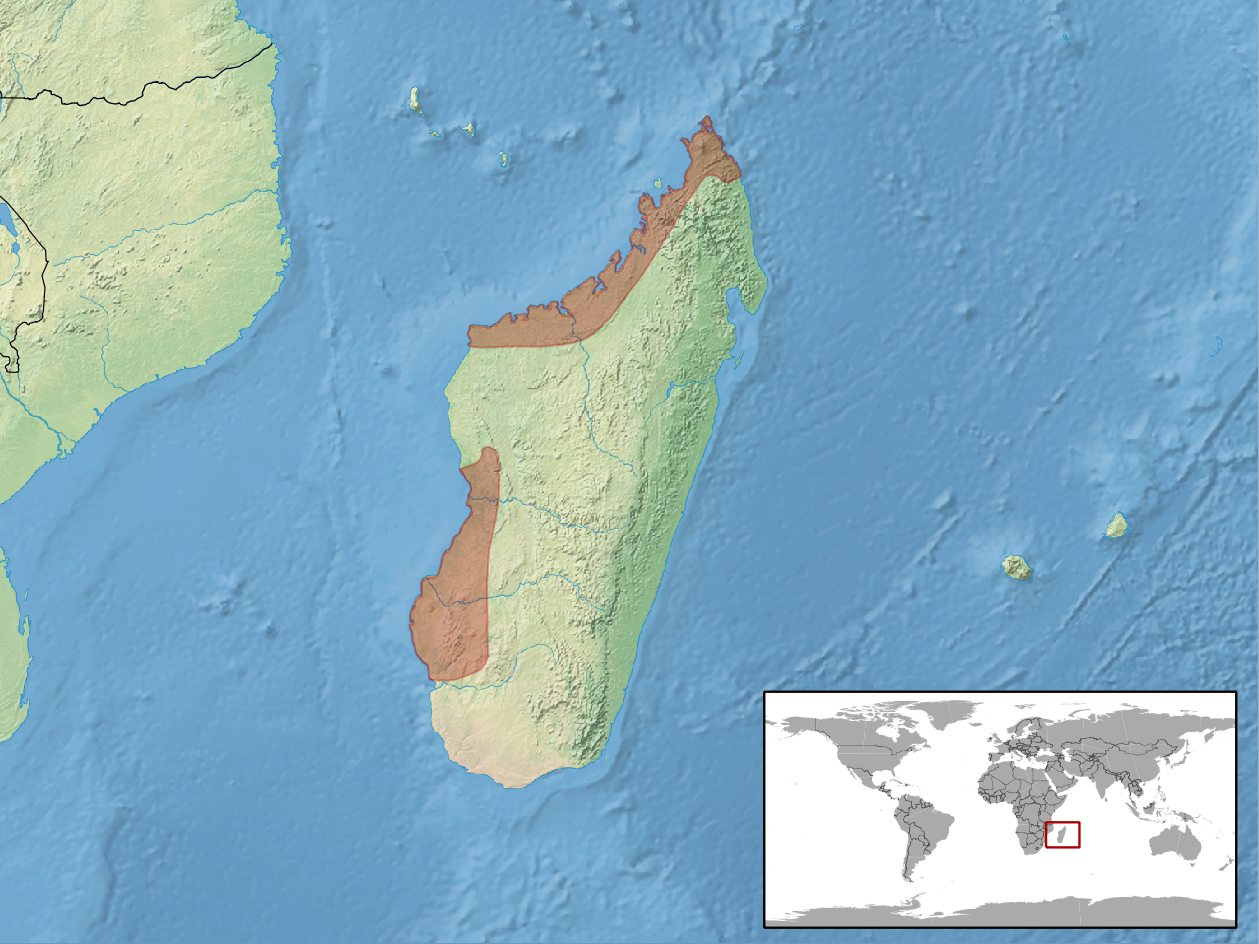

= Madascincus polleni =

Species of reptile

The Madagascar coastal skink (Madascincus polleni) is an extant species of skink, a lizard in the family Scincidae. The species is endemic to Madagascar.
