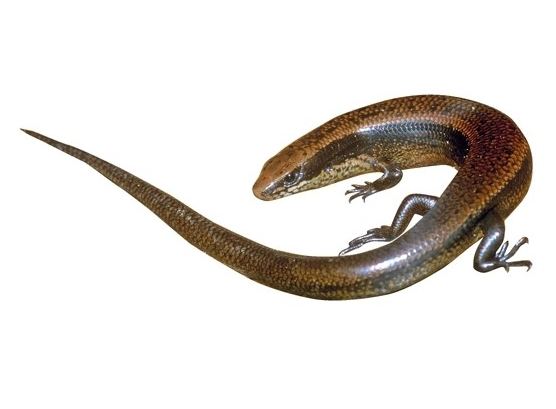

Conservation status
- Least Concern (IUCN 3.1)

Scientific classification
- Kingdom: Animalia
- Phylum: Chordata
- Class: Reptilia
- Order: Squamata
- Family: Scincidae
- Genus: Madascincus
- Species: M. mouroundavae

Binomial name
- Madascincus mouroundavae (Grandidier, 1872)

= Madascincus mouroundavae =

Species of reptile

The Morondava skink (Madascincus mouroundavae) is an extant species of skink, a lizard in the family Scincidae. The species is endemic to Madagascar.
