= Madascincus ankodabensis =

Conservation status
- Data Deficient (IUCN 3.1)

Scientific classification
- Kingdom: Animalia
- Phylum: Chordata
- Class: Reptilia
- Order: Squamata
- Family: Scincidae
- Genus: Madascincus
- Species: M. ankodabensis

Binomial name
- Madascincus ankodabensis (Angel, 1930)
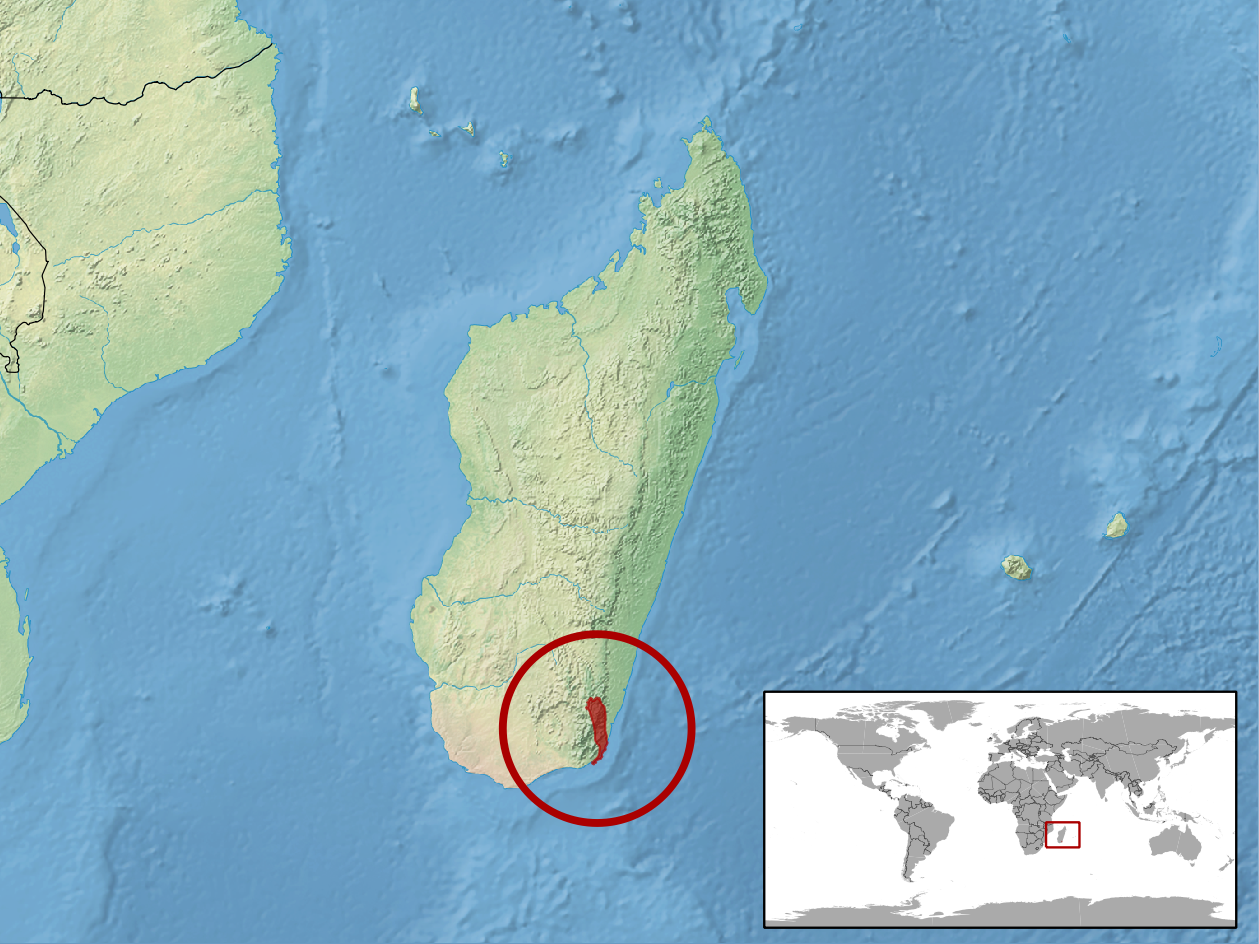

Species of reptile

The Ankodabe skink (Madascincus ankodabensis) is an extant species of skink, a lizard in the family Scincidae. The species is endemic to Madagascar.
