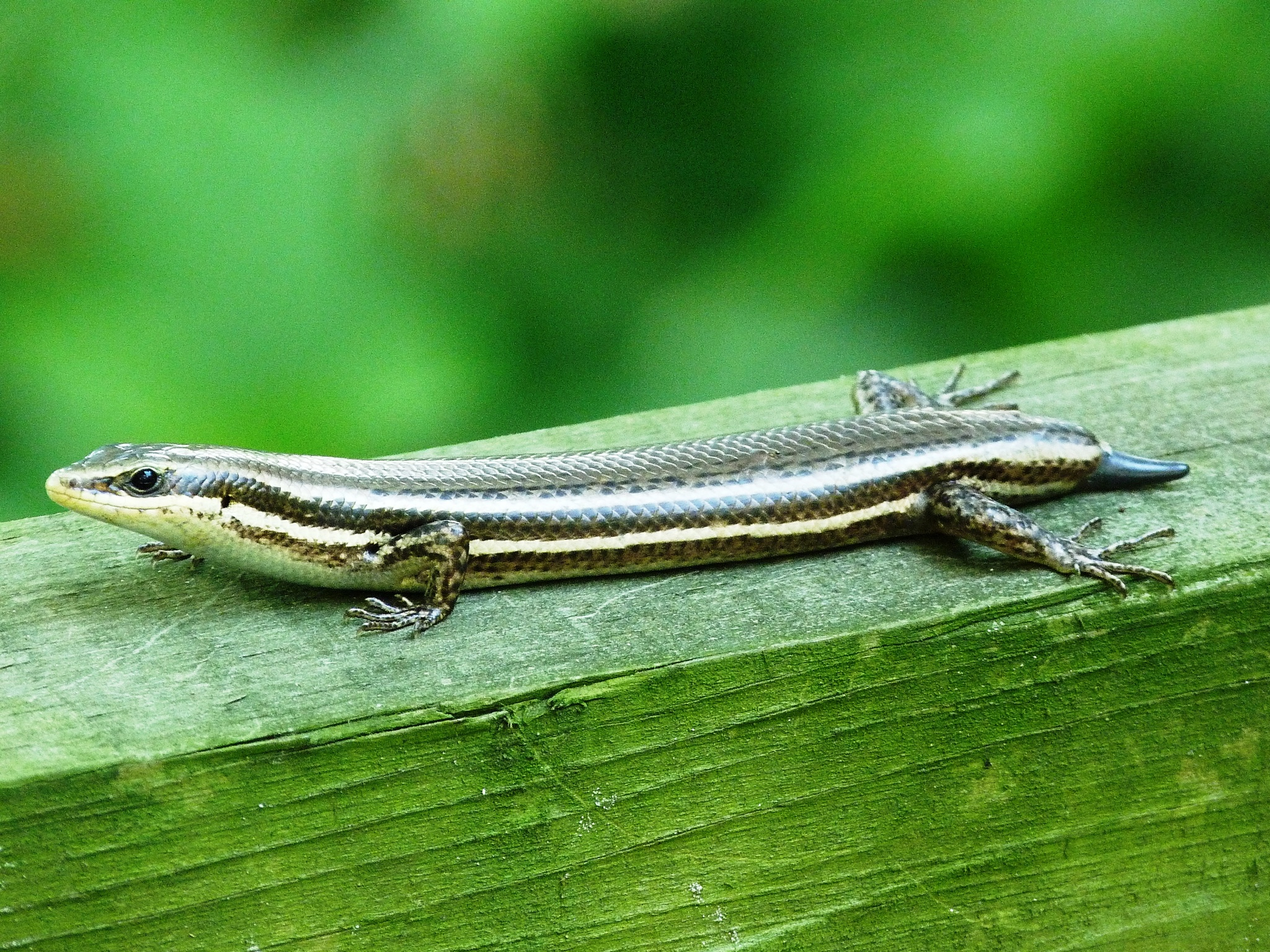
- Marisora roatanae

Scientific classification
- Kingdom: Animalia
- Phylum: Chordata
- Class: Reptilia
- Order: Squamata
- Family: Scincidae
- Subfamily: Mabuyinae
- Genus: Marisora; Hedges & Conn, 2012

Species
- 13 spp., see text

= Marisora =

Genus of lizards

Marisora is a genus of skinks. They are found in Mexico, Central America and some Caribbean islands.

== Species ==
The following 13 species, listed alphabetically by specific name, are recognized as being valid:

- Marisora alliacea (Cope, 1875)
- Marisora aquilonaria McCranie, Matthews, & Hedges, 2020 – Southern Sierra Madre skink
- Marisora aurulae Hedges & Conn, 2012 – Lesser Windward skink
- Marisora berengerae (Miralles, 2006) – San Andrés skink
- Marisora brachypoda (Taylor, 1956)
- Marisora falconensis (Mijares-Urrutia & Arends, 1997)
- Marisora lineola McCranie, Matthews, & Hedges, 2020 – Mayan skink
- Marisora magnacornae Hedges & Conn, 2012 – Corn Island skink
- Marisora pergravis (Barbour, 1921) – Providencia skink
- Marisora roatanae Hedges & Conn, 2012 – Roatán skink
- Marisora syntoma McCranie, Matthews, & Hedges, 2020 – Tehuantepec skink
- Marisora unimarginata (Cope, 1862) – Central American mabuya
- Marisora urtica McCranie, Matthews, & Hedges, 2020 – Fonseca Islands skink

Nota bene: A binomial authority in parentheses indicates that the species was originally described in a genus other than Marisora.
