= Maracaiba =

Scientific classification
- Kingdom: Animalia
- Phylum: Chordata
- Class: Reptilia
- Order: Squamata
- Family: Scincidae
- Subfamily: Mabuyinae
- Genus: Maracaiba; Hedges & Conn, 2012

Species
- 2 sp., see text

Genus of lizards

Photo of Mérida Skink (Maracaiba)

Maracaiba is a genus of skinks.

== Species ==
The following 2 species, listed alphabetically by specific name, are recognized as being valid:

- Maracaiba meridensis (Miralles, G. Rivas, & Schargel, 2005)
- Maracaiba zuliae (Miralles, G. Rivas, Bonillo, Schargel, Barros, García-Perez, & Barrio-Amorós, 2009)

Nota bene: A binomial authority in parentheses indicates that the species was originally described in a genus other than Maracaiba.
