= Flexiseps ornaticeps =

Conservation status
- Least Concern (IUCN 3.1)

Scientific classification
- Domain: Eukaryota
- Kingdom: Animalia
- Phylum: Chordata
- Class: Reptilia
- Order: Squamata
- Family: Scincidae
- Genus: Flexiseps
- Species: F. ornaticeps

Binomial name
- Flexiseps ornaticeps (Boulenger, 1896)
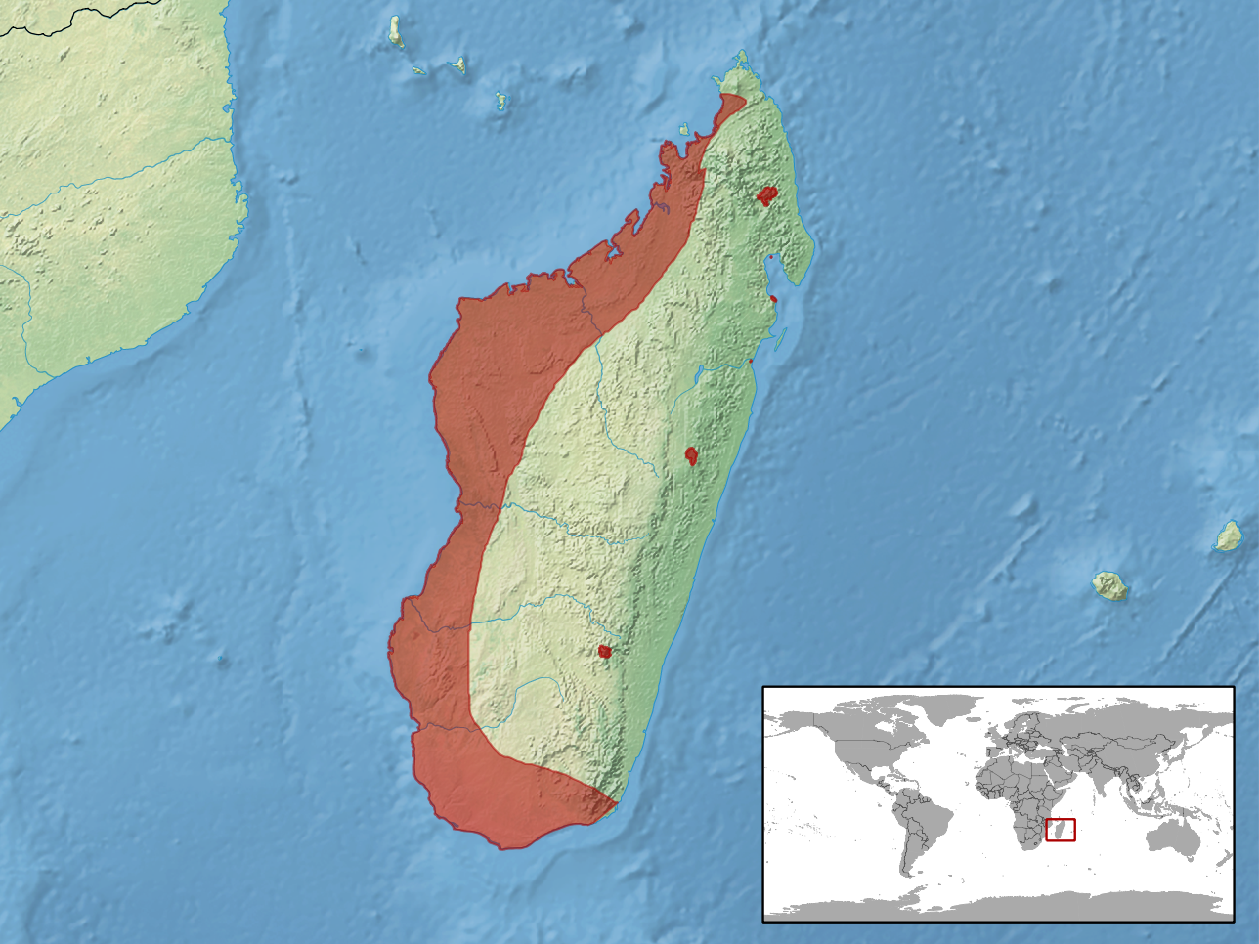

Synonyms
- Amphiglossus ornaticeps

Species of lizard

The gray skink (Flexiseps ornaticeps) is a species of skink endemic to Madagascar.
