= Flexiseps johannae =

Conservation status
- Least Concern (IUCN 3.1)

Scientific classification
- Domain: Eukaryota
- Kingdom: Animalia
- Phylum: Chordata
- Class: Reptilia
- Order: Squamata
- Family: Scincidae
- Genus: Flexiseps
- Species: F. johannae

Binomial name
- Flexiseps johannae (Günther, 1880)
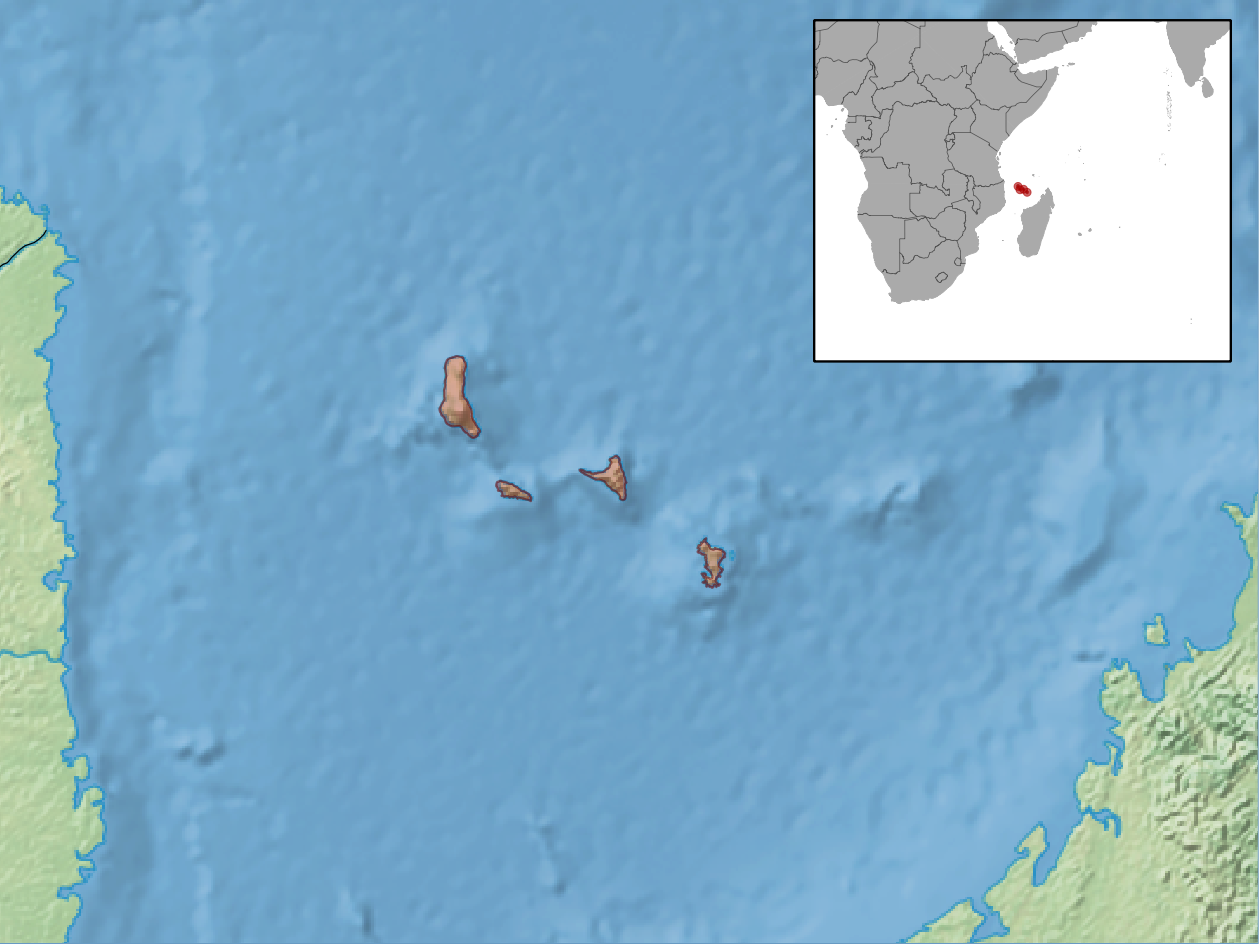

Synonyms
- Amphiglossus johannae

Species of lizard

Johanna's skink (Flexiseps johannae) is a species of skink endemic to the Comoro Islands.
