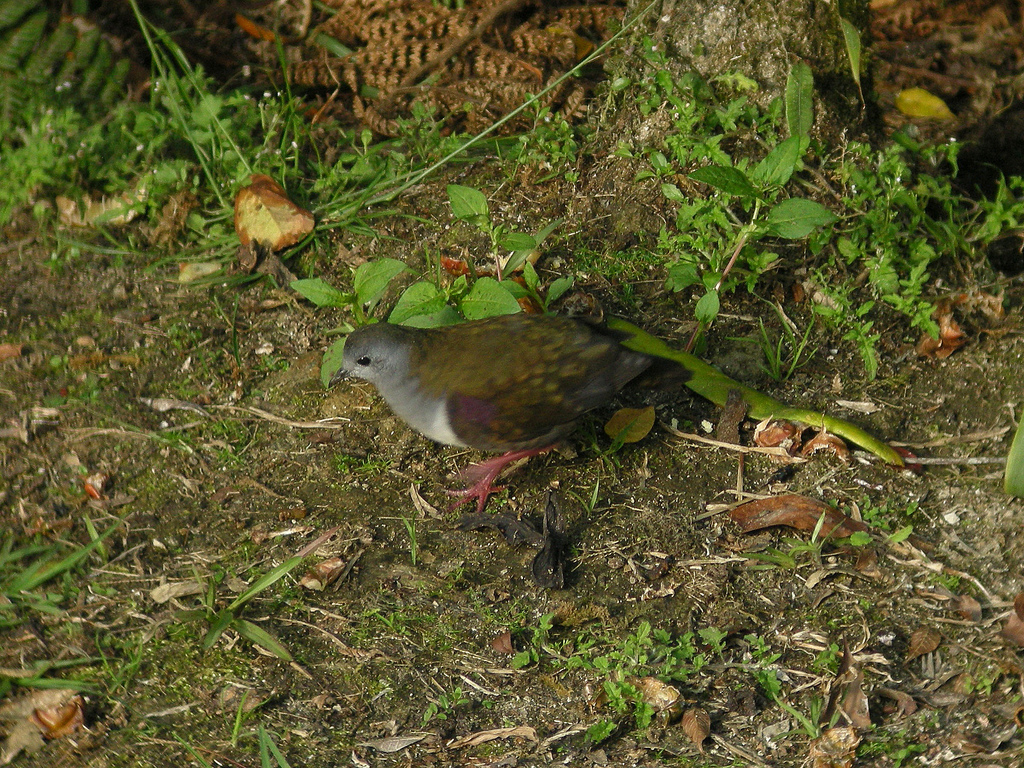

Conservation status
- Least Concern (IUCN 3.1)

Scientific classification
- Kingdom: Animalia
- Phylum: Chordata
- Class: Aves
- Order: Columbiformes
- Family: Columbidae
- Genus: Pampusana
- Species: P. beccarii

Binomial name
- Pampusana beccarii (Salvadori, 1876)

Synonyms
- Chalcophaps beccarii Salvadori, 1876; Phlegaenas beccarii; Gallicolumba beccarii; Alopecoenas beccarii

= Bronze ground dove =

Species of bird

The bronze ground dove (Pampusana beccarii) is a species of bird in the family Columbidae.

This species was formerly in the genus Alopecoenas Sharpe, 1899, but the name of the genus was changed in 2019 to Pampusana Bonaparte, 1855 as this name has priority. Birds from the eastern part of its range are sometimes treated as a separate species, Pampusana (or Alopecoenas) johannae.

== Distribution and habitat ==
It is found in New Guinea, the Bismarck Archipelago and the Solomon Islands. Its natural habitats are subtropical or tropical moist lowland forest and subtropical or tropical moist montane forest with an elevation up to 1250 meters.

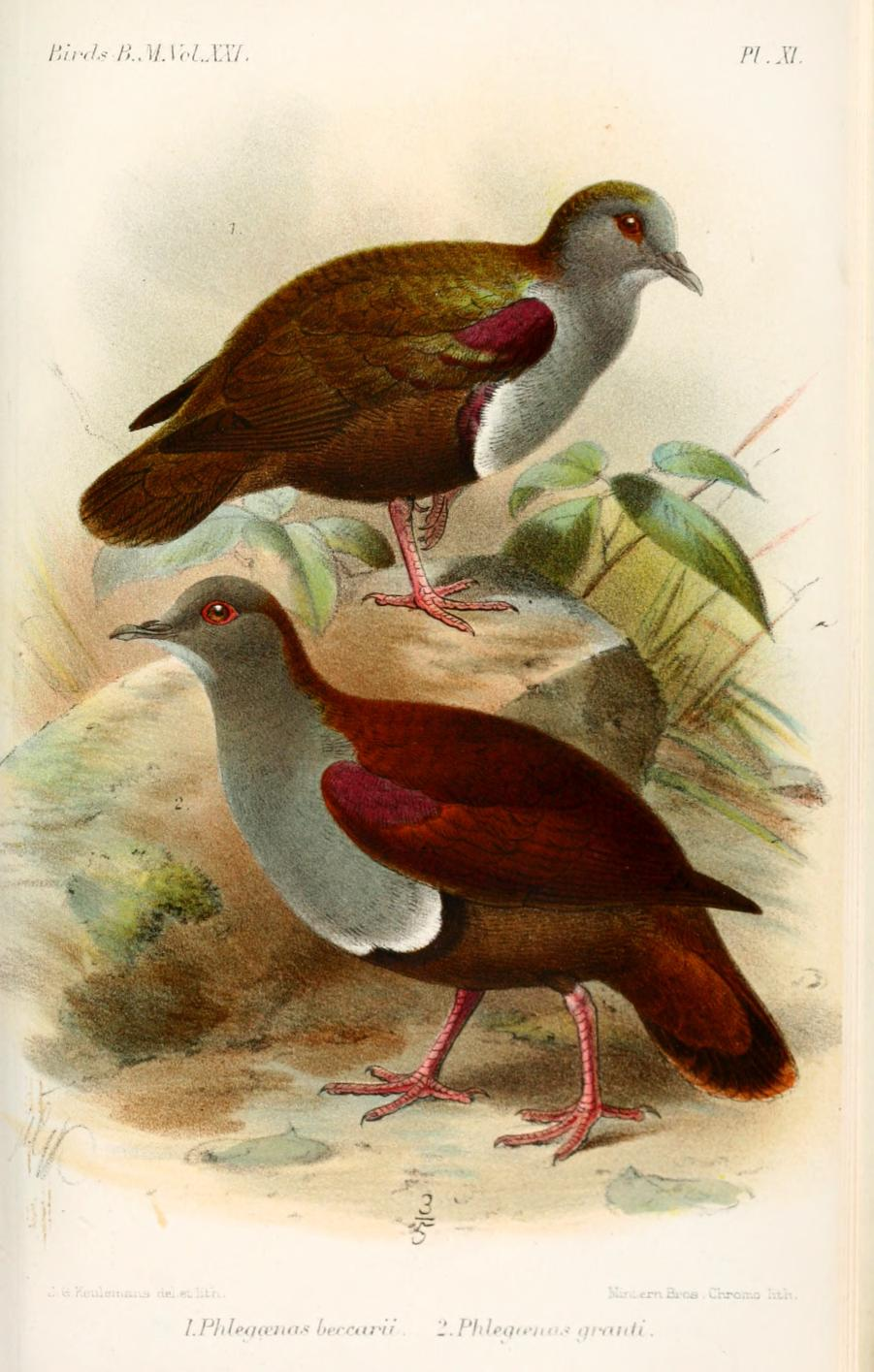
Bronze ground dove (above)
