= Aurélien Miralles =

French herpetologist, phylogeneticist and taxonomist

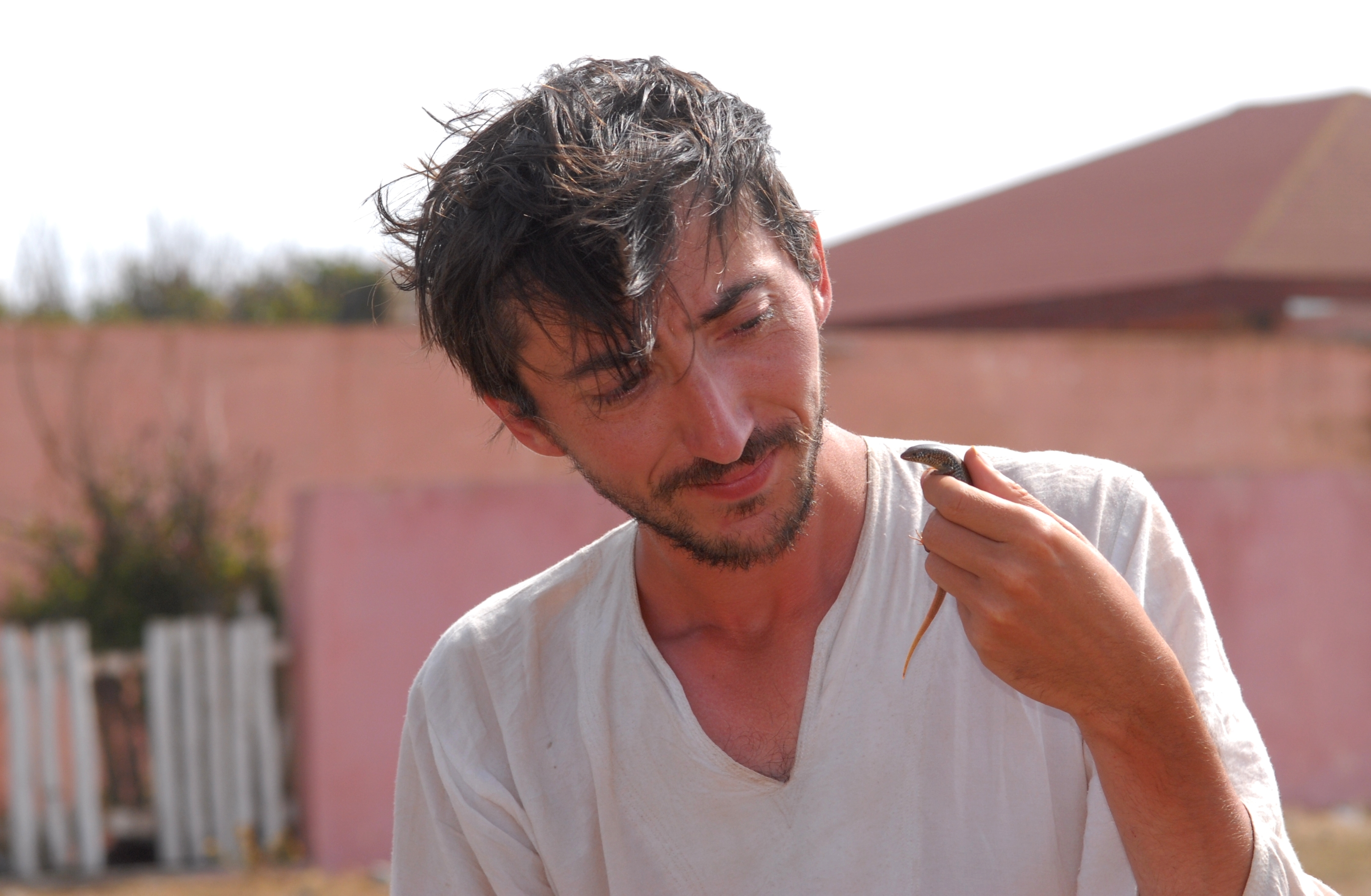
- Miralles in Morocco in June 2012, holding a Polylepis skink (Chalcides polylepis)
- Born: 7 April 1978 (age 48); France
- Education: Muséum national d'histoire naturelle
- Known for: Systematics of Scincidae
- Scientific career
- Fields: Herpetology, phylogenetics, taxonomy
- Doctoral advisor: Jean-Pierre Gasc

Aurélien Miralles (born 7 April 1978) is a French herpetologist, phylogeneticist and taxonomist. He specializes in the systematics of scincid lizards and has also studied adaptations to a fossorial lifestyle, a phenomenon repeatedly observed among squamates, including limb reduction.

Several of his studies concern methodological and theoretical aspects of taxonomy, including species delimitation and the comparison of taxonomic methods.

Miralles has also researched human perceptions of and empathic responses toward biological diversity and other living organisms.

== Biography ==
Miralles received his doctorate in 2006 for research on the evolution and systematics of South American skinks at the Muséum national d'histoire naturelle in Paris, under the supervision of Jean-Pierre Gasc. He subsequently held several postdoctoral positions in the laboratory of Miguel Vences in Germany, including research on Malagasy skinks, as well as at the Institut de systématique, évolution, biodiversité (ISYEB), the Centre national de la recherche scientifique (CNRS), and LMU Munich.

In 2021, Miralles completed his habilitation à diriger des recherches (HDR), a French postdoctoral qualification, on alpha taxonomy in the 21st century and the inventory of biodiversity in the digital age and during the sixth mass extinction.

== Taxonomic work ==
Miralles has been involved in the description and taxonomic revision of numerous reptiles, particularly skinks and other lizards. Selected taxa described by him or with which he was involved include:

- Maracaiba meridensis (Miralles, Rivas & Schargel, 2005)
- Varzea altamazonica (Miralles, Barrio-Amorós, Rivas & Chaparro-Auza, 2006)
- Alinea berengerae (Miralles, 2006)
- Fimbrios smithi (Ziegler, David, Miralles, Doan Van Kien & Nguyen Quang Truong, 2008)
- Maracaiba zuliae (Miralles, Rivas Fuenmayor, Bonillo, Schargel, Barros, Garcia-Pérez & Barrio-Amorós, 2009)
- Orosaura nebulosylvestris (Miralles, Rivas Fuenmayor, Bonillo, Schargel, Barros, Garcia-Pérez & Barrio-Amorós, 2009)
- Chioninia vaillantii xanthotis (Miralles, Vasconcelos, Perera, Harris & Carranza, 2011)
- Chioninia spinalis santiagoensis (Miralles, Vasconcelos, Perera, Harris & Carranza, 2011)
- Chioninia spinalis boavistensis (Miralles, Vasconcelos, Perera, Harris & Carranza, 2011)
- Paracontias vermisaurus (Miralles, Köhler, Vieites, Glaw & Vences, 2011)
- Paracontias ampijoroensis (Miralles, Jono, Mori, Gandola, Erens, Köhler, Glaw & Vences)
- Paracontias mahamavo (Miralles, Jono, Mori, Gandola, Erens, Köhler, Glaw & Vences)
- Madascincus arenicola (Miralles, Köhler, Glaw & Vences, 2011)
- Madascincus miafina (Miralles, Köhler, Glaw & Vences, 2016)
- Madascincus pyrurus (Miralles, Köhler, Glaw & Vences, 2016)
- Amphiglossus meva (Miralles, Raselimanana, Rakotomalala, Vences & Vieites, 2011)
- Brookesia brunoi (Crottini, Miralles, Glaw, Harris, Lima & Vences, 2012)
- Voeltzkowia mobydick (Miralles, Anjeriniaina, Hipsley, Müller, Glaw & Vences, 2012)
- Paragehyra austini (Crottini, Harris, Miralles, Glaw, Jenkins, Randrianantoandro, Bauer & Vences, 2014)
- Paragehyra felicitae (Crottini, Harris, Miralles, Glaw, Jenkins, Randrianantoandro, Bauer & Vences, 2014)
- Uroplatus fiera (Ratsoavina, Ranjanaharisoa, Glaw, Raselimanana, Miralles & Vences, 2015)
- Chalarodon steinkampi (Miralles, Glaw, Ratsoavina & Vences, 2015)
- Brachyseps (Erens, Miralles, Glaw, Chatrou & Vences, 2017)
- Flexiseps (Erens, Miralles, Glaw, Chatrou & Vences, 2017)
- Amblyrhynchus cristatus godzilla (Miralles, Macleod, Rodríguez, Ibáñez, Jiménez-Uzcátegui, Quezada, Vences & Steinfartz, 2017)
- Amblyrhynchus cristatus jeffreysi (Miralles, Macleod, Rodríguez, Ibáñez, Jiménez-Uzcátegui, Quezada, Vences & Steinfartz, 2017)
- Amblyrhynchus cristatus hayampi (Miralles, Macleod, Rodríguez, Ibáñez, Jiménez-Uzcátegui, Quezada, Vences & Steinfartz, 2017)
- Amblyrhynchus cristatus trillmichi (Miralles, Macleod, Rodríguez, Ibáñez, Jiménez-Uzcátegui, Quezada, Vences & Steinfartz, 2017)
- Amblyrhynchus cristatus wikelskii (Miralles, Macleod, Rodríguez, Ibáñez, Jiménez-Uzcátegui, Quezada, Vences & Steinfartz, 2017)
- Acanthodactylus lacrymae (Miralles, Geniez, Beddek, Mendez-Aranda, Brito, Leblois & Crochet, 2020)
- Acanthodactylus montanus (Miralles, Geniez, Beddek, Mendez-Aranda, Brito, Leblois & Crochet, 2020)
- Paroedura rennerae (Miralles, Bruy, Crottini, Rakotoarison, Ratsoavina, Scherz, Schmidt, Köhler, Glaw, Vences, 2021)
