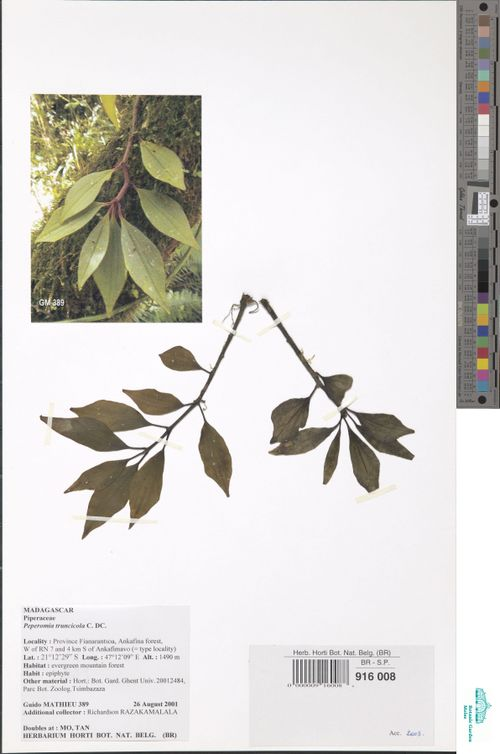

Scientific classification
- Kingdom: Plantae
- Clade: Tracheophytes
- Clade: Angiosperms
- Clade: Magnoliids
- Order: Piperales
- Family: Piperaceae
- Genus: Peperomia
- Species: P. truncicola

Binomial name
- Peperomia truncicola C.DC.

= Peperomia truncicola =

Species of epiphyte

Peperomia truncicola is a species of epiphyte in the genus Peperomia. It primarily grows on wet tropical biomes. Its Conservation Status is Not Threatened.

== Description ==
The first specimens where collected at Betsileo.

Auxiliary catkins, upper leaves filiform laxiflorus, rhachis glabrous orbicular bract sessile centre, ovary ovate apex sub-oblique stigmatiferous, alternating leaves moderately petiolate, narrowly lanceolate, base cuneate, apex acuminate above and below glabrous, apex margin eiliolate 5-veined, berry glabrous elliptic anteriorly convex posteriorly suberect.

Herbs on mossy tree trunks. When dry, the sparsely long stems are roughly 10 centimetres long and 2 millimetres thick, with terrible rooting above the roots. At the stem's apex, the leaves are compressed. 6 1/2 inches long and 1 1/2 inches wide, wrap in cling film. About a centimetre long petiole. Peduncles measuring 4 1/2 cm in length. About 6 1/2 centimetres long, the catfish. The berry is somewhat less than one millimetre in length.

== Taxonomy and naming ==
It was described in 1894 by Casimir de Candolle in "Botanische Jahrbücher für Systematik, Pflanzengeschichte und Pflanzengeographie.", from collected specimens by Johann Maria Hildebrandt in 1881. It gets its name from wikt:trunci + wikt:-cola, which means tree trunk inhabitor.

== Distribution and habitat ==
It is endemic to Madagascar. It grows on epiphyte environment and is a herb.
