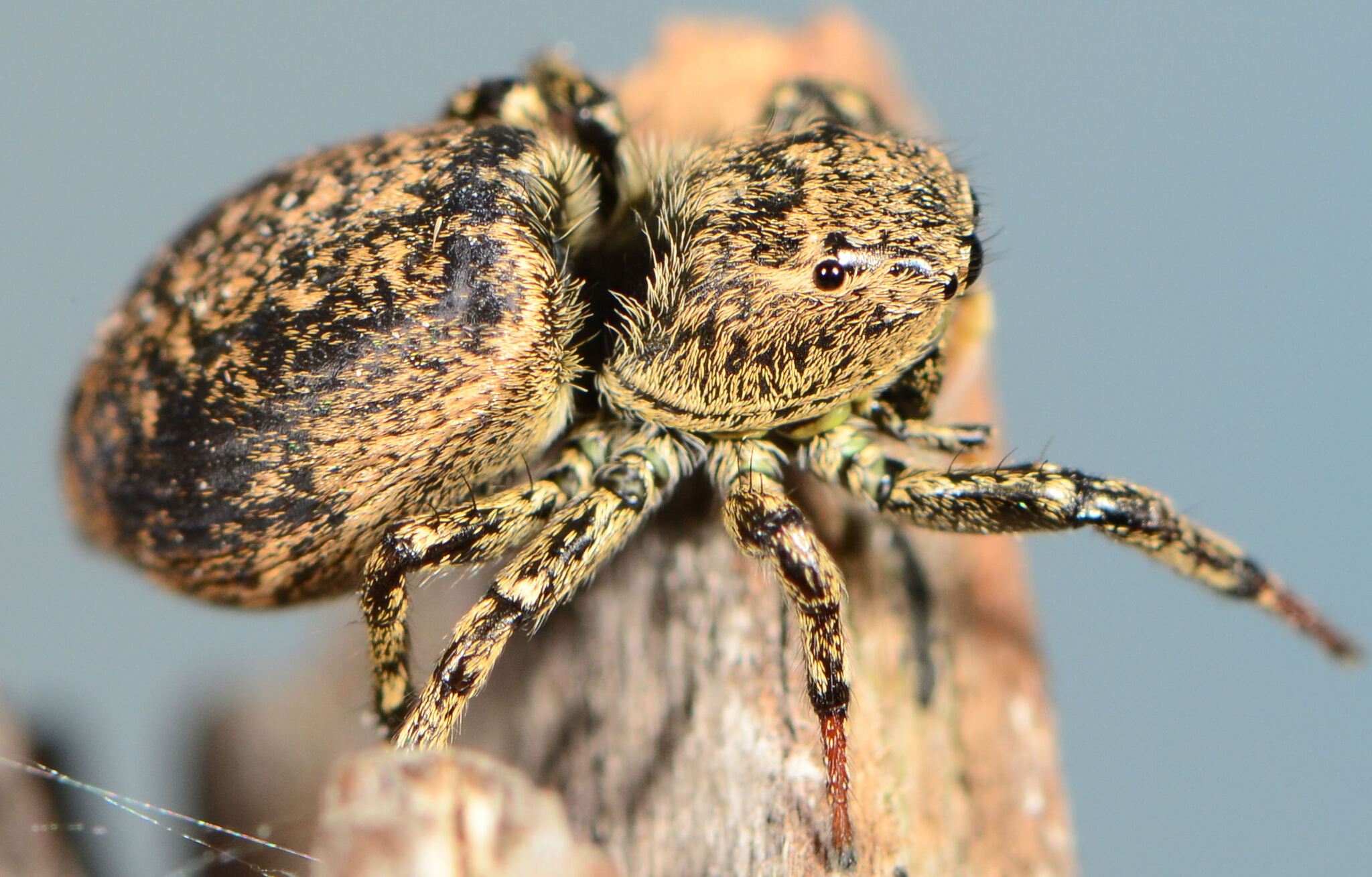
- female T. lesserti
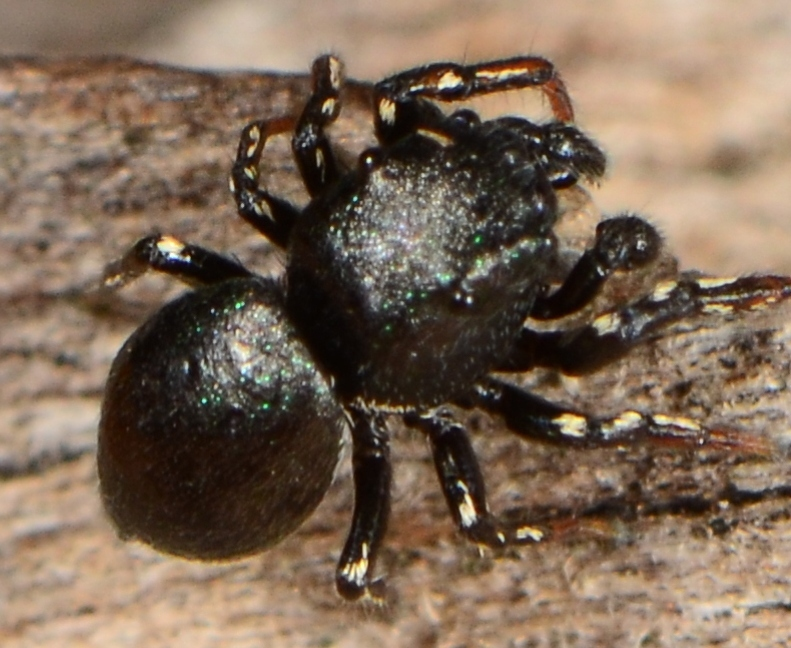
- male T. capicola

Scientific classification
- Kingdom: Animalia
- Phylum: Arthropoda
- Subphylum: Chelicerata
- Class: Arachnida
- Order: Araneae
- Infraorder: Araneomorphae
- Family: Salticidae
- Subfamily: Salticinae
- Genus: Trapezocephalus; Berland & Millot, 1941

Type species
- Trapezocephalus aelurilliformis Berland & Millot, 1941

Species
- See text.

= Trapezocephalus =

Genus of spiders

Trapezocephalus is a genus of the spider family Salticidae (jumping spiders).

== Species ==
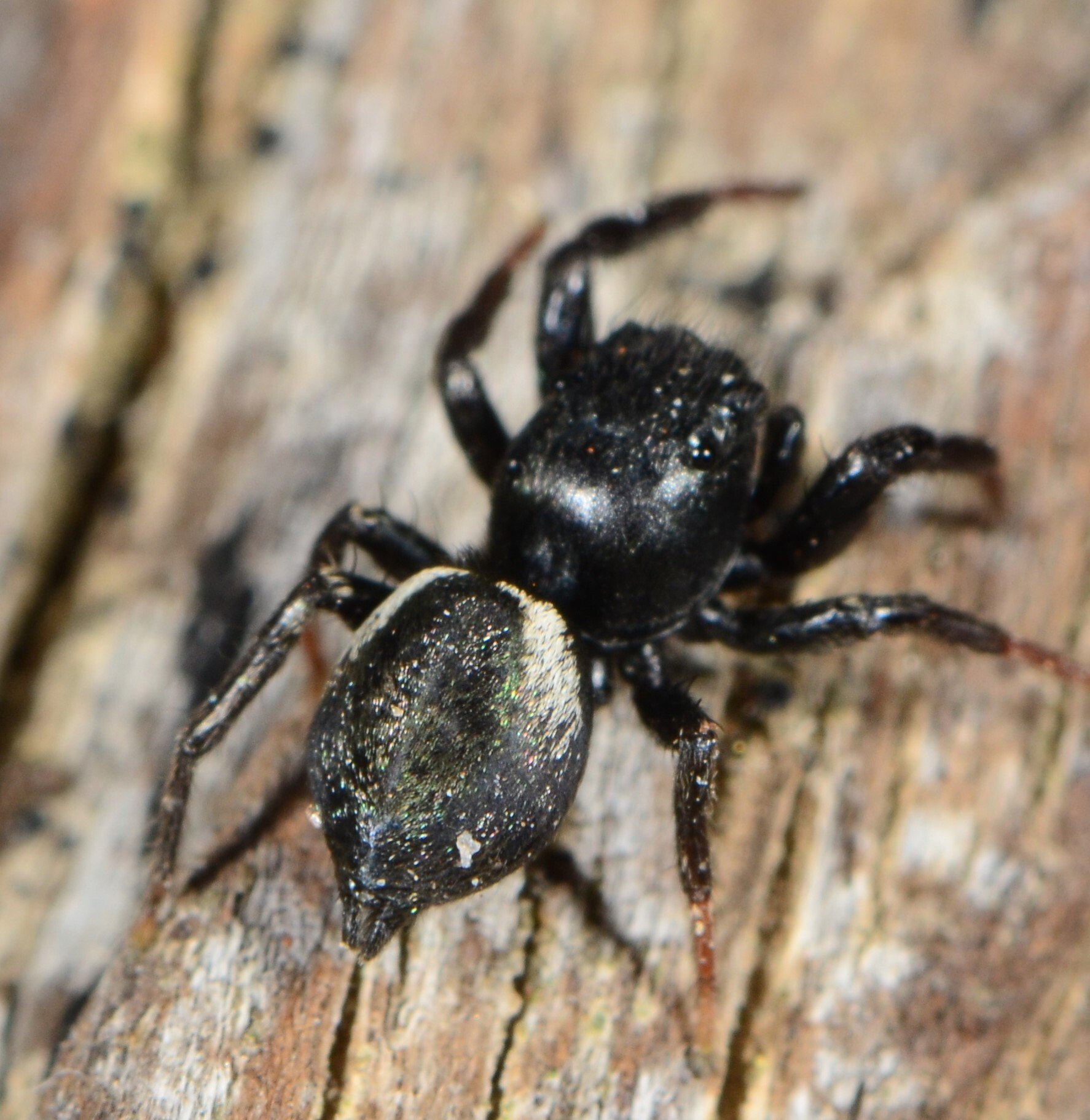
male T. deamatus

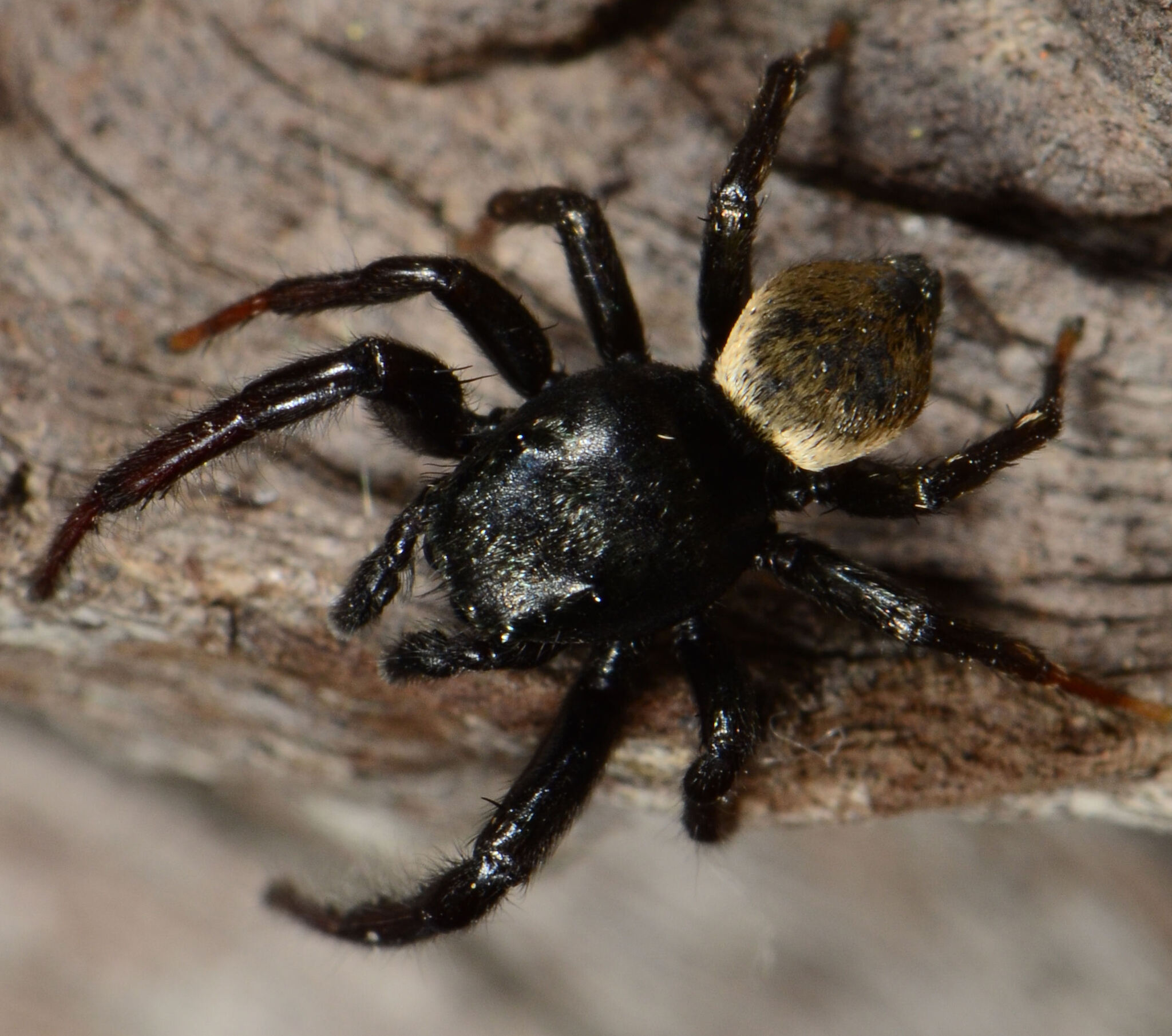
male T. lesserti

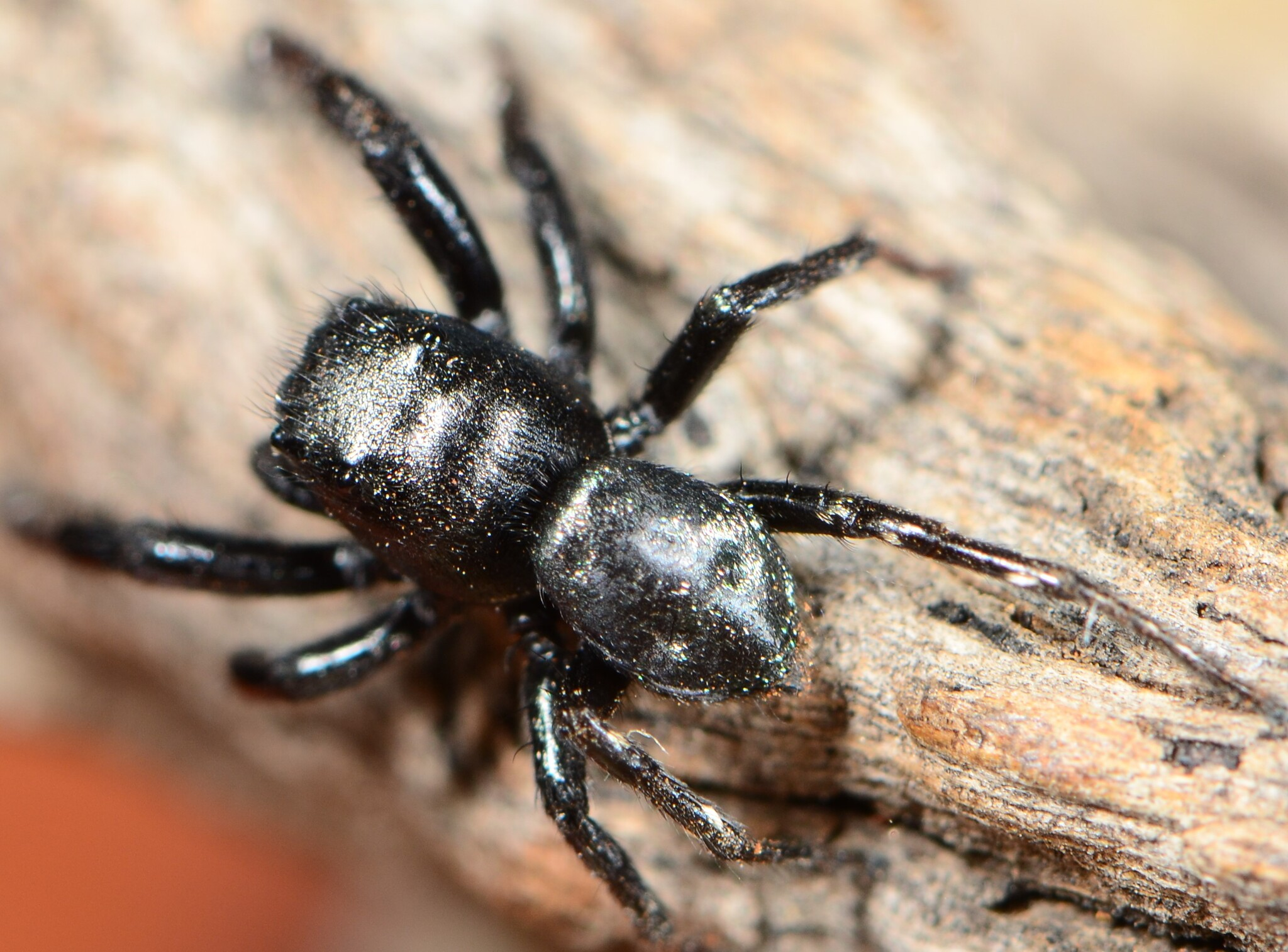
male T. orchesta

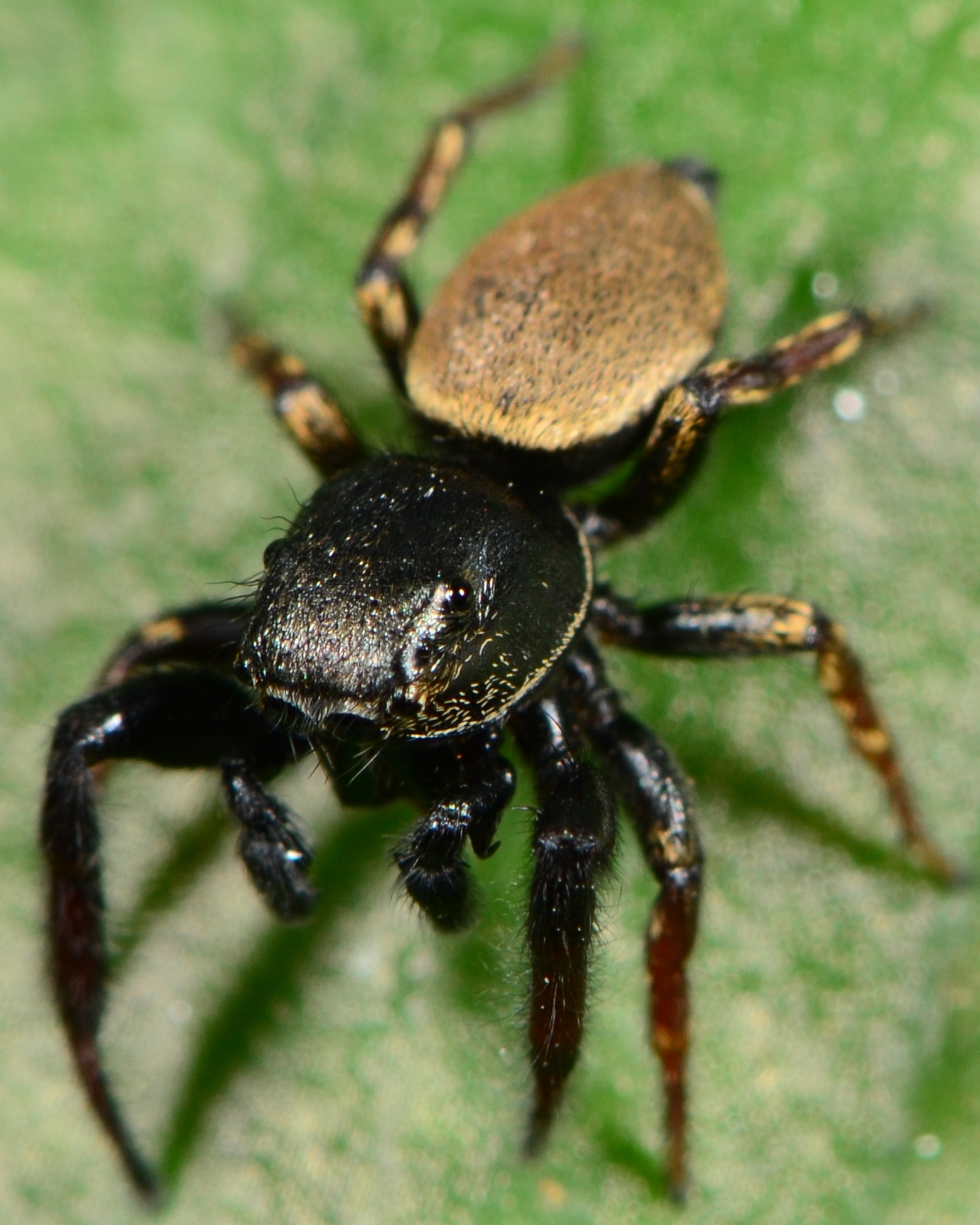
male T. transvaalicus

As of October 2025, this genus includes fourteen species:

- Trapezocephalus aviculus (Berland & Millot, 1941) – Central, West Africa
- Trapezocephalus capicola (Simon, 1901) – South Africa, Lesotho
- Trapezocephalus cassinicola (Simon, 1909) – West, Central, East Africa, Mozambique, Yemen (type species)
- Trapezocephalus deamatus (G. W. Peckham & E. G. Peckham, 1903) – Central, Southern Africa
- Trapezocephalus harpago (Simon, 1909) – Central, West Africa
- Trapezocephalus infaustus (G. W. Peckham & E. G. Peckham, 1903) – East Africa, Zimbabwe
- Trapezocephalus kittenbergeri (Caporiacco, 1947) – Tanzania
- Trapezocephalus lesserti (Wesołowska, 1986) – Central, Southern Africa
- Trapezocephalus ndumoensis (Wesołowska & Haddad, 2013) – South Africa
- Trapezocephalus orchesta (Simon, 1886) – Ivory Coast, DR Congo, Kenya, Tanzania, Malawi, Namibia, Botswana, Mozambique, South Africa, Madagascar
- Trapezocephalus robustus (Berland & Millot, 1941) – Guinea, Ivory Coast, Nigeria, DR Congo
- Trapezocephalus semirasus (Lawrence, 1928) – Namibia
- Trapezocephalus transvaalicus (Simon, 1901) – South Africa
- Trapezocephalus tristis (Wesołowska, 2003) – Ethiopia
