= Carex hildebrandtiana =

Conservation status
- Vulnerable (IUCN 3.1)

Scientific classification
- Kingdom: Plantae
- Clade: Tracheophytes
- Clade: Angiosperms
- Clade: Monocots
- Clade: Commelinids
- Order: Poales
- Family: Cyperaceae
- Genus: Carex
- Species: C. hildebrandtiana

Binomial name
- Carex hildebrandtiana Boeckeler

Species of plant

Carex hildebrandtiana is a tussock-forming species of perennial sedge in the family Cyperaceae. It is native to central parts of Madagascar. The plant is listed as a Vulnerable species according to the International Union for Conservation of Nature.

The species was first formally described by the botanist Johann Otto Boeckeler in 1884 as a part of the work Botanische Jahrbücher für Systematik, Pflanzengeschichte und Pflanzengeographie. The type specimen was collected in 1881 near Betsiléeo by Johann Maria Hildebrandt.

== See also ==
- List of Carex species
