= Carex madagascariensis =

Scientific classification
- Kingdom: Plantae
- Clade: Tracheophytes
- Clade: Angiosperms
- Clade: Monocots
- Clade: Commelinids
- Order: Poales
- Family: Cyperaceae
- Genus: Carex
- Species: C. madagascariensis

Binomial name
- Carex madagascariensis Boeckeler

Species of plant

Carex madagascariensis is a tussock-forming species of perennial sedge in the family Cyperaceae. It is native to central and eastern parts of Madagascar.

The species was first formally described by the botanist Johann Otto Boeckeler in 1884 as a part of the work Botanische Jahrbücher für Systematik, Pflanzengeschichte und Pflanzengeographie. The type specimen was collected by Johann Maria Hildebrandt in 1880 near Andrangoloaka.

== See also ==
- List of Carex species
