= Paracontias holomelas =

Conservation status
- Least Concern (IUCN 3.1)

Scientific classification
- Kingdom: Animalia
- Phylum: Chordata
- Class: Reptilia
- Order: Squamata
- Family: Scincidae
- Genus: Paracontias
- Species: P. holomelas

Binomial name
- Paracontias holomelas (Günther, 1877)
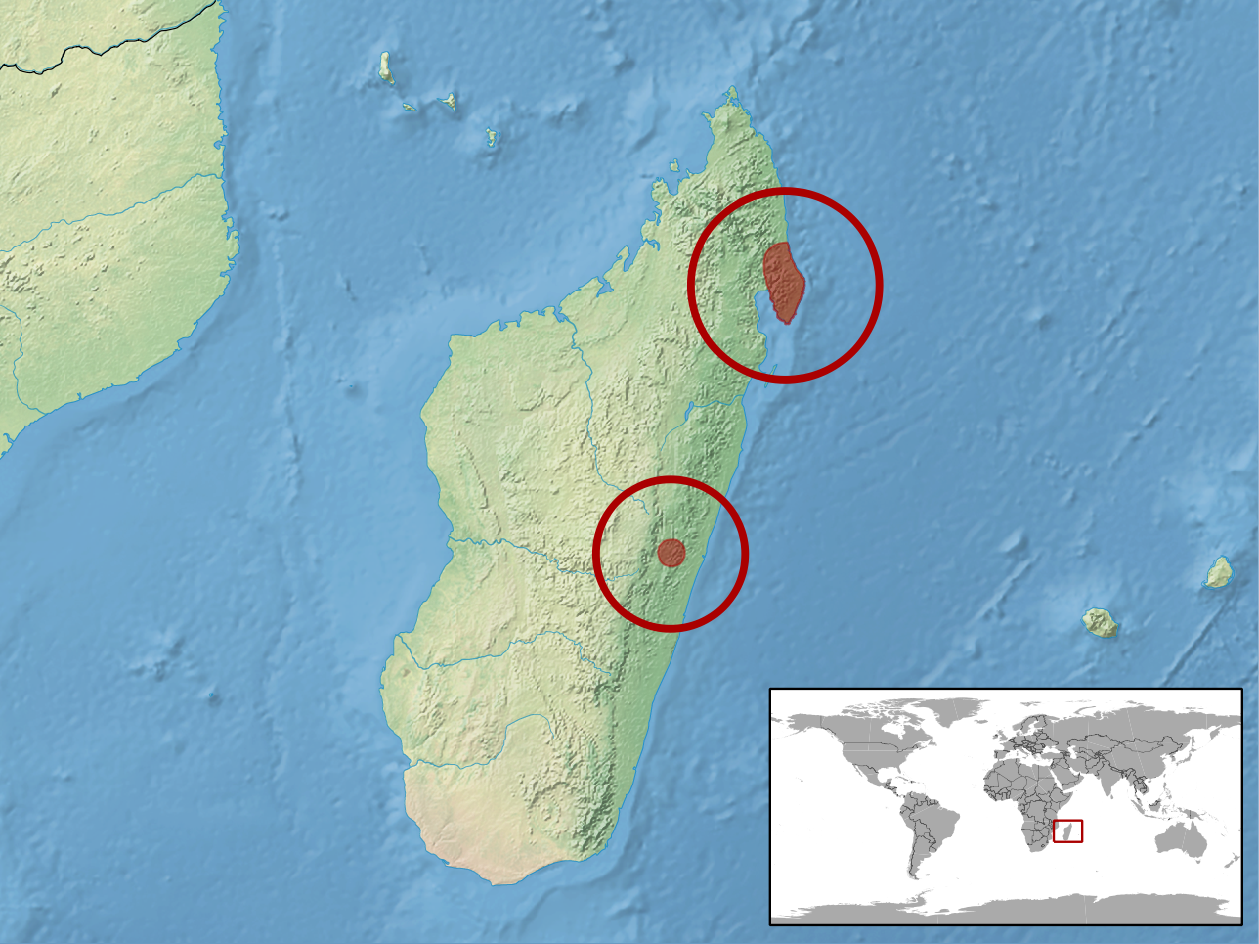

Species of lizard

The Anzahamaru skink (Paracontias hildebrandti) is a species of skinks. It is endemic to Madagascar.
