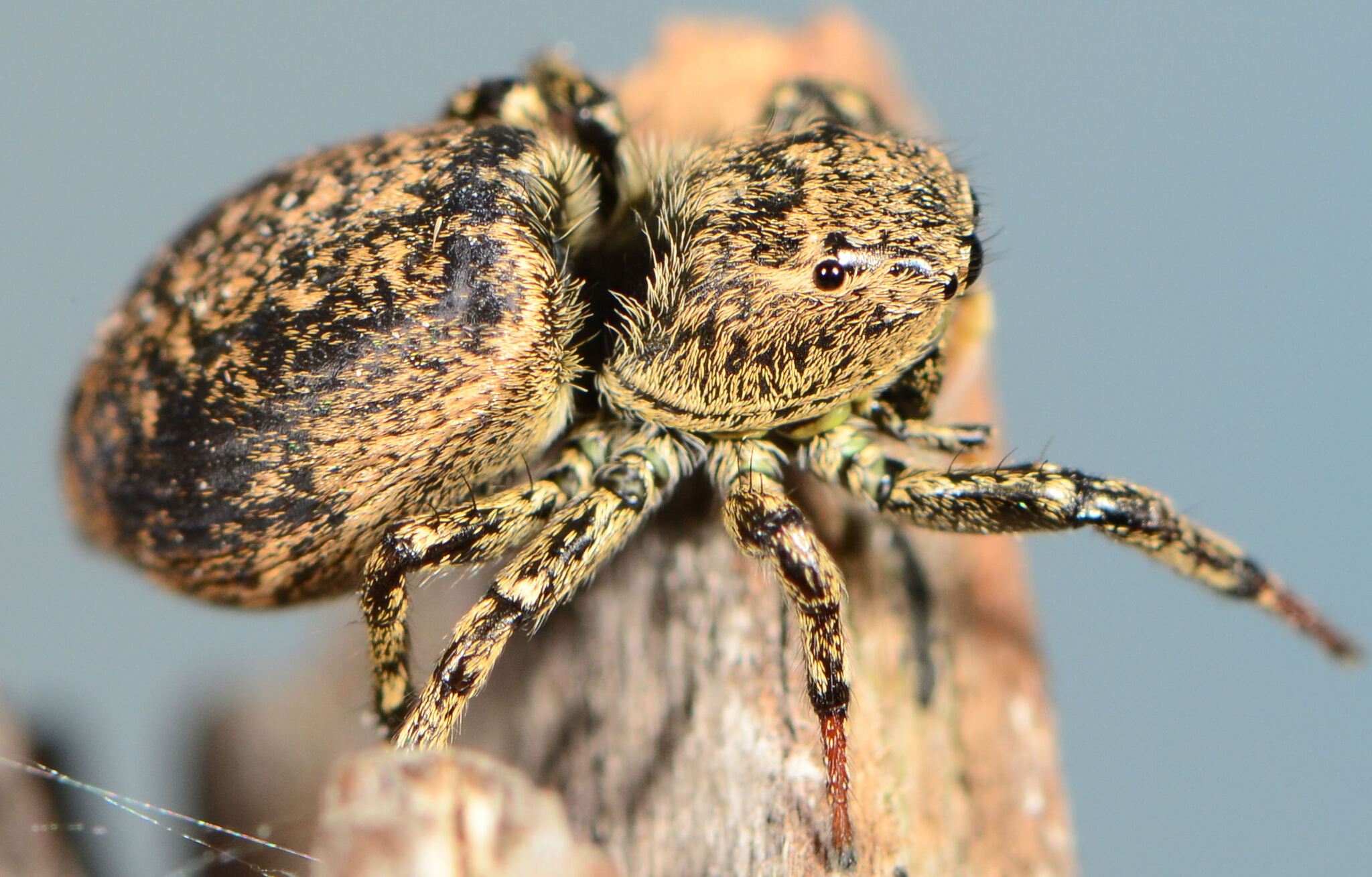
- female
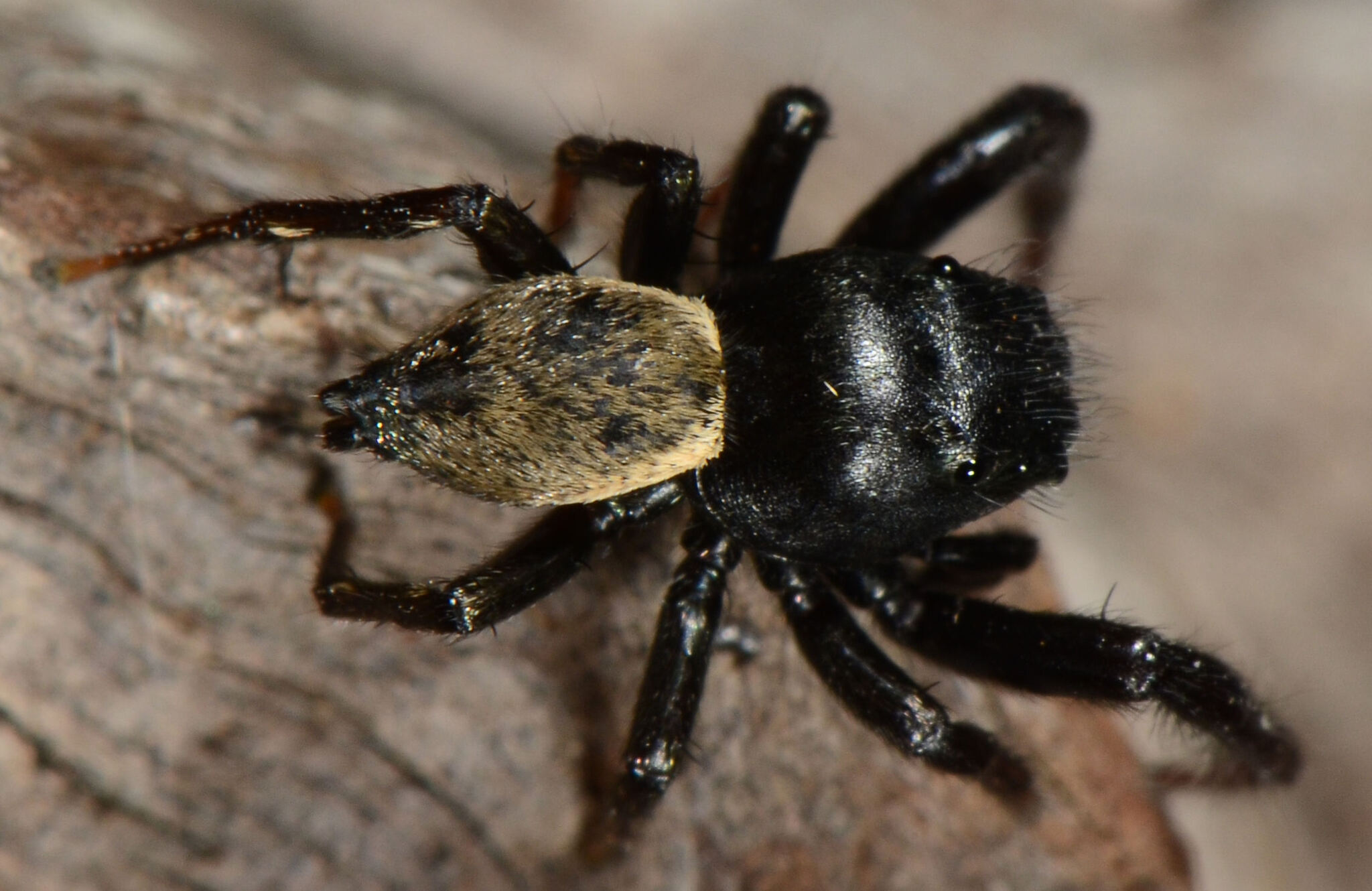
- male

Scientific classification
- Kingdom: Animalia
- Phylum: Arthropoda
- Subphylum: Chelicerata
- Class: Arachnida
- Order: Araneae
- Infraorder: Araneomorphae
- Family: Salticidae
- Genus: Trapezocephalus
- Species: T. lesserti

Binomial name
- Trapezocephalus lesserti Wesołowska, 1986

Synonyms
- Heliophanus lesserti Wesołowska, 1986

= Trapezocephalus lesserti =

Species of spider

Trapezocephalus lesserti is a jumping spider species in the genus Heliophanus. It was first described by Wanda Wesołowska in 1986 and lives in Central and Southern Africa.

The species is named after Swiss arachnologist Roger de Lessert, who worked extensively on African spiders.

== Description ==
T. lesserti has a primarily black colored body with light yellow and gold accents. The front legs are notability thicker than the rest while the back four having light yellow details. The part of the abdomen that is attached to the cephalothorax has a light yellow coloring surrounding the edge.

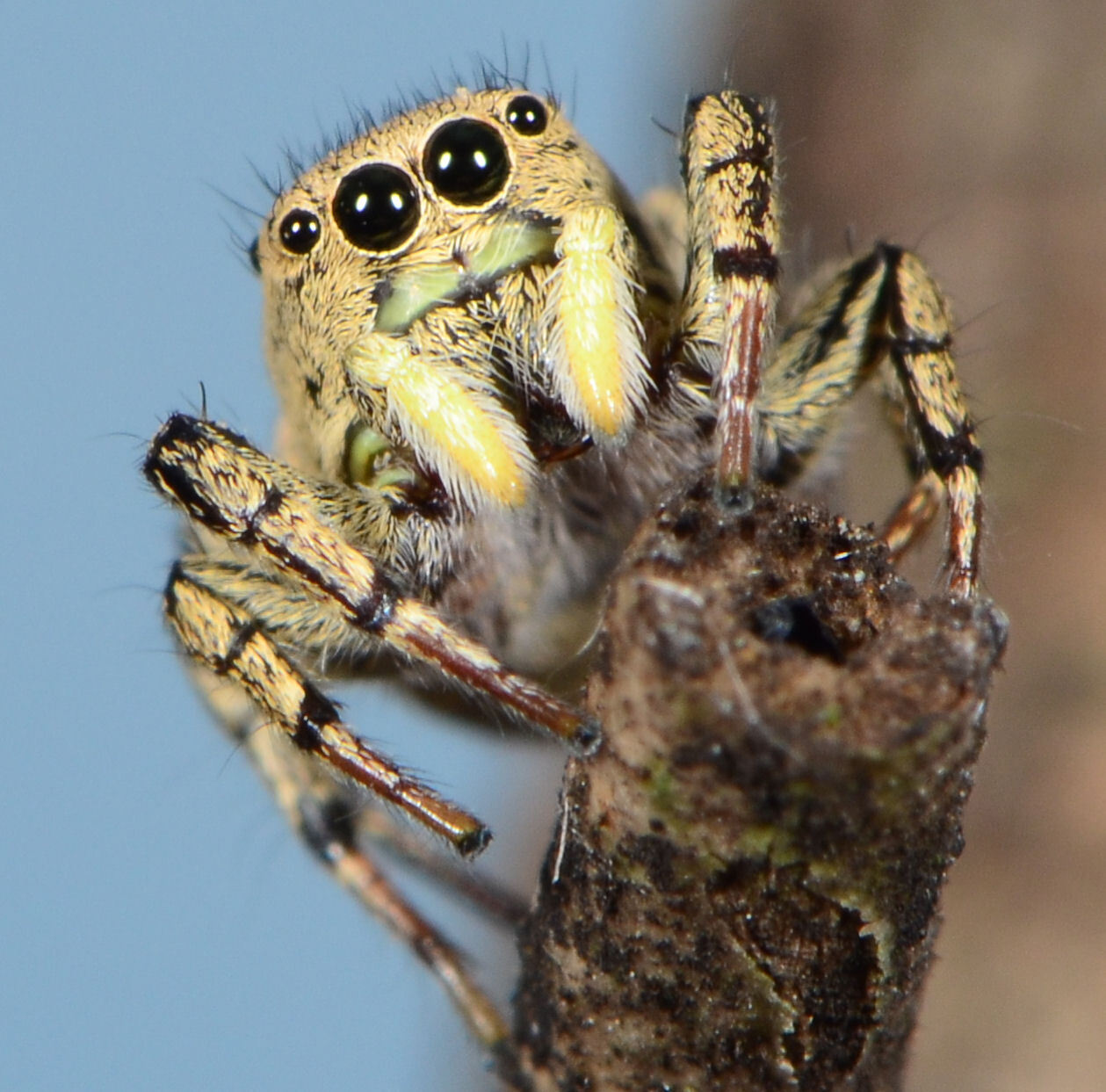
female

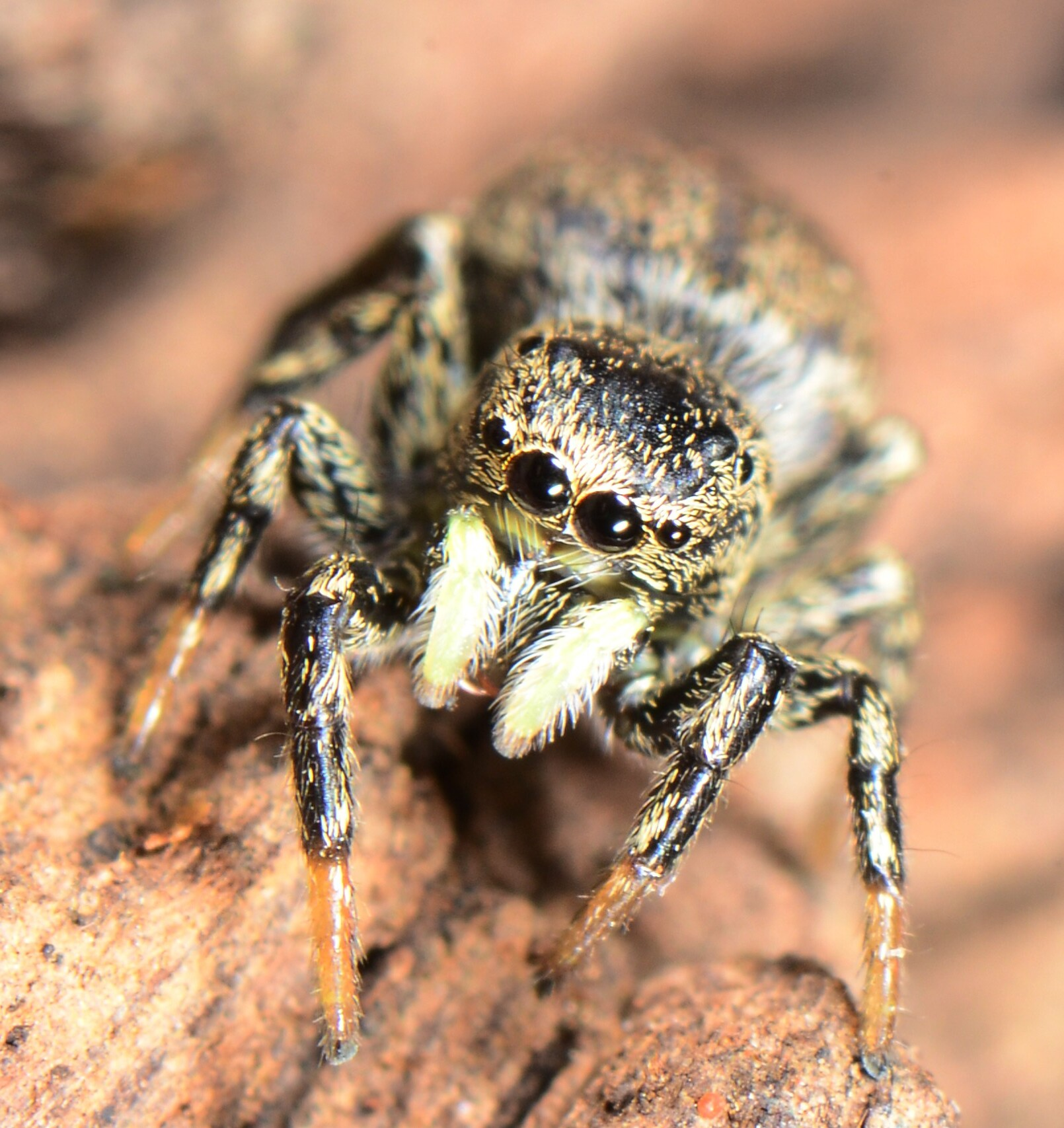
female

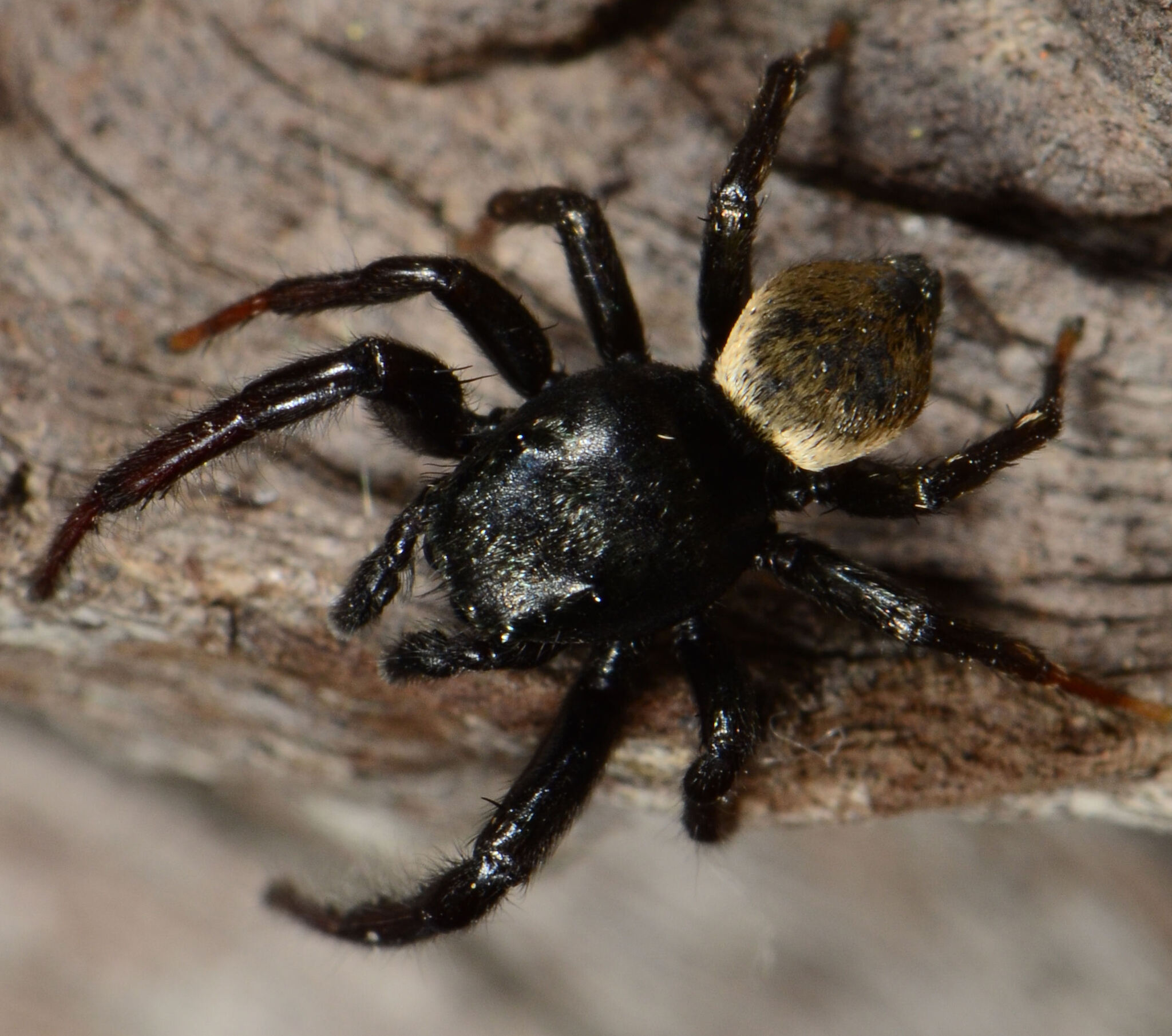
male

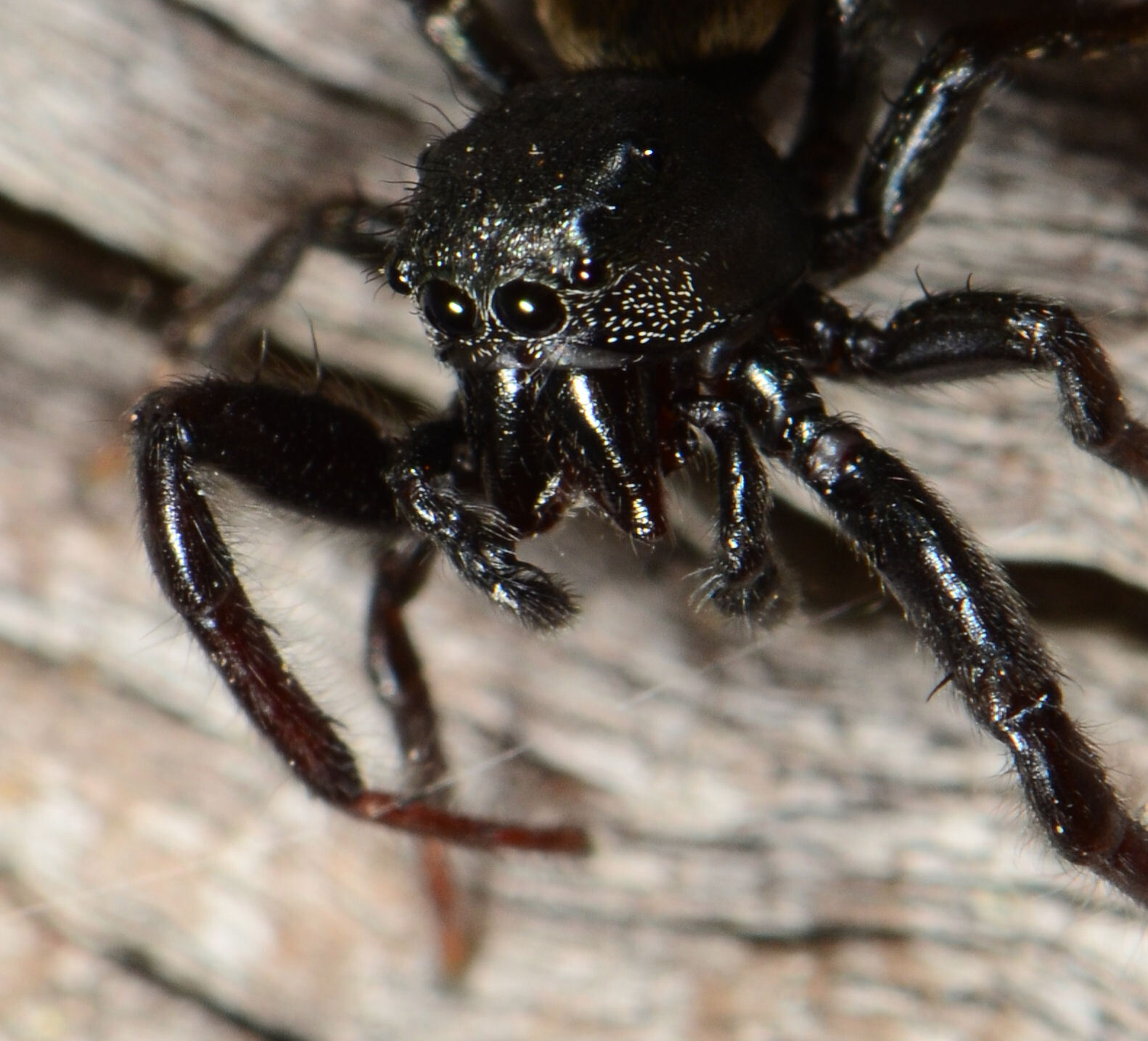
male

== History ==
This species was first recorded by Wanda Wesołowska in 1986. A description of the species was submitted to the Natural History Museum of Bern and has a status of "accepted" marking the species as officially recognized.
