= Paracontias kankana =

Conservation status
- Vulnerable (IUCN 3.1)

Scientific classification
- Kingdom: Animalia
- Phylum: Chordata
- Class: Reptilia
- Order: Squamata
- Family: Scincidae
- Genus: Paracontias
- Species: P. kankana

Binomial name
- Paracontias kankana Köhler, Vieites, Glaw, Kaffenberger, & Vences, 2009
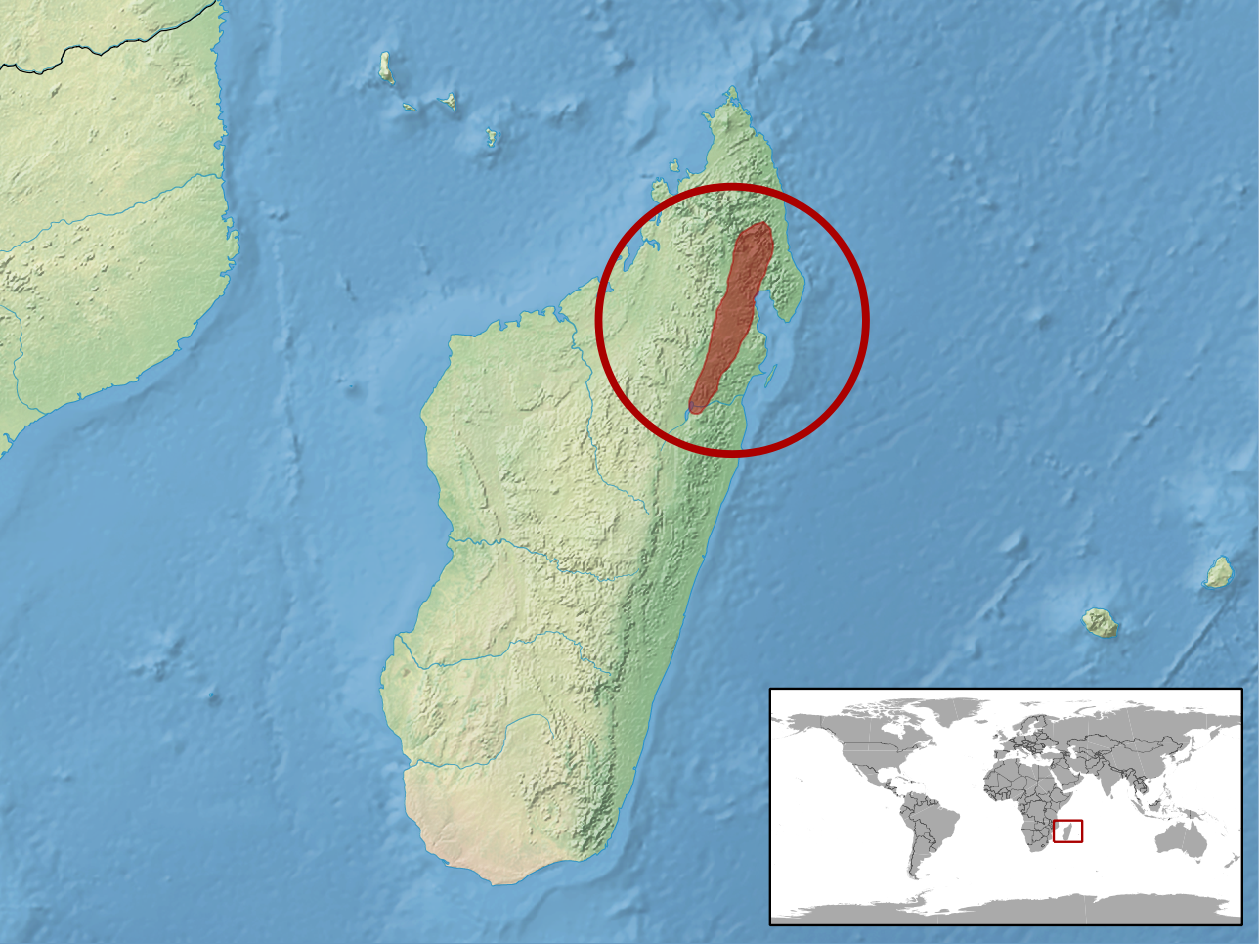

Species of lizard

Paracontias kankana is a species of skinks. It is endemic to Madagascar.
