= Paracontias ampijoroensis =

Scientific classification
- Kingdom: Animalia
- Phylum: Chordata
- Class: Reptilia
- Order: Squamata
- Family: Scincidae
- Genus: Paracontias
- Species: P. ampijoroensis

Binomial name
- Paracontias ampijoroensis Miralles, Jono, Mori, Gandola, Erens, Köhler, Glaw, & Vences, 2016

Species of lizard

Paracontias ampijoroensis is a species of skinks. It is endemic to Madagascar.
