= Trachylepis hildebrandtii =

Conservation status
- Least Concern (IUCN 3.1)

Scientific classification
- Kingdom: Animalia
- Phylum: Chordata
- Class: Reptilia
- Order: Squamata
- Family: Scincidae
- Genus: Trachylepis
- Species: T. hildebrandtii

Binomial name
- Trachylepis hildebrandtii (W. Peters, 1874)

Synonyms
- Euprepes hildebrandtii W. Peters, 1874; Mabuia hildebrandtii — Boulenger, 1892; Mabuya hidebrandtii — Parker, 1942; Euprepis hidebrandtii — Mausfeld et al., 2002; Trachylepis hildebrandtii — Bauer, 2003

Species of lizard

Trachylepis hildebrandtii, also known commonly as Hildebrandt's mabuya and Hildebrandt's skink, is a species of lizard in the family Scincidae. The species is indigenous to the Horn of Africa.

== Etymology ==
T. hidebrandtii is named after Johann Maria Hildebrandt, who was a German botanist and explorer.

== Geographic range ==
T. hildebrandtii is found in eastern Ethiopia and Somalia.

== Habitat ==
The preferred natural habitats of T. hildebrndtii are savanna and shrubland.

== Behavior ==
T. hildebrandtii is terrestrial.

== Reproduction ==
The mode of reproduction of T. hildebrandtii is unknown.
