= Paracontias milloti =

Conservation status
- Data Deficient (IUCN 3.1)

Scientific classification
- Kingdom: Animalia
- Phylum: Chordata
- Class: Reptilia
- Order: Squamata
- Family: Scincidae
- Genus: Paracontias
- Species: P. milloti

Binomial name
- Paracontias milloti Angel, 1949

Synonyms
- Paracontias (Angelias) milloti Angel, 1949

Species of lizard

Paracontias milloti, also known commonly as the Nosy Mamoko skink, is a species of lizard in the subfamily Scincinae of the family Scincidae. The species is endemic to Madagascar.

== Etymology ==
The specific name, milloti, is in honor of French arachnologist Jacques Millot.

== Description ==
Paracontias milloti has no legs, and it has no external ear openings.

== Geographic distribution ==
In Madagascar, Paracontias milloti is found on the islands Nosy Mamoko and Nosy Mitsio.

== Behavior ==
Paracontias milloti is terrestrial and fossorial.
