= Paracontias brocchii =

Conservation status
- Near Threatened (IUCN 3.1)

Scientific classification
- Kingdom: Animalia
- Phylum: Chordata
- Class: Reptilia
- Order: Squamata
- Family: Scincidae
- Genus: Paracontias
- Species: P. brocchii

Binomial name
- Paracontias brocchii Mocquard, 1894
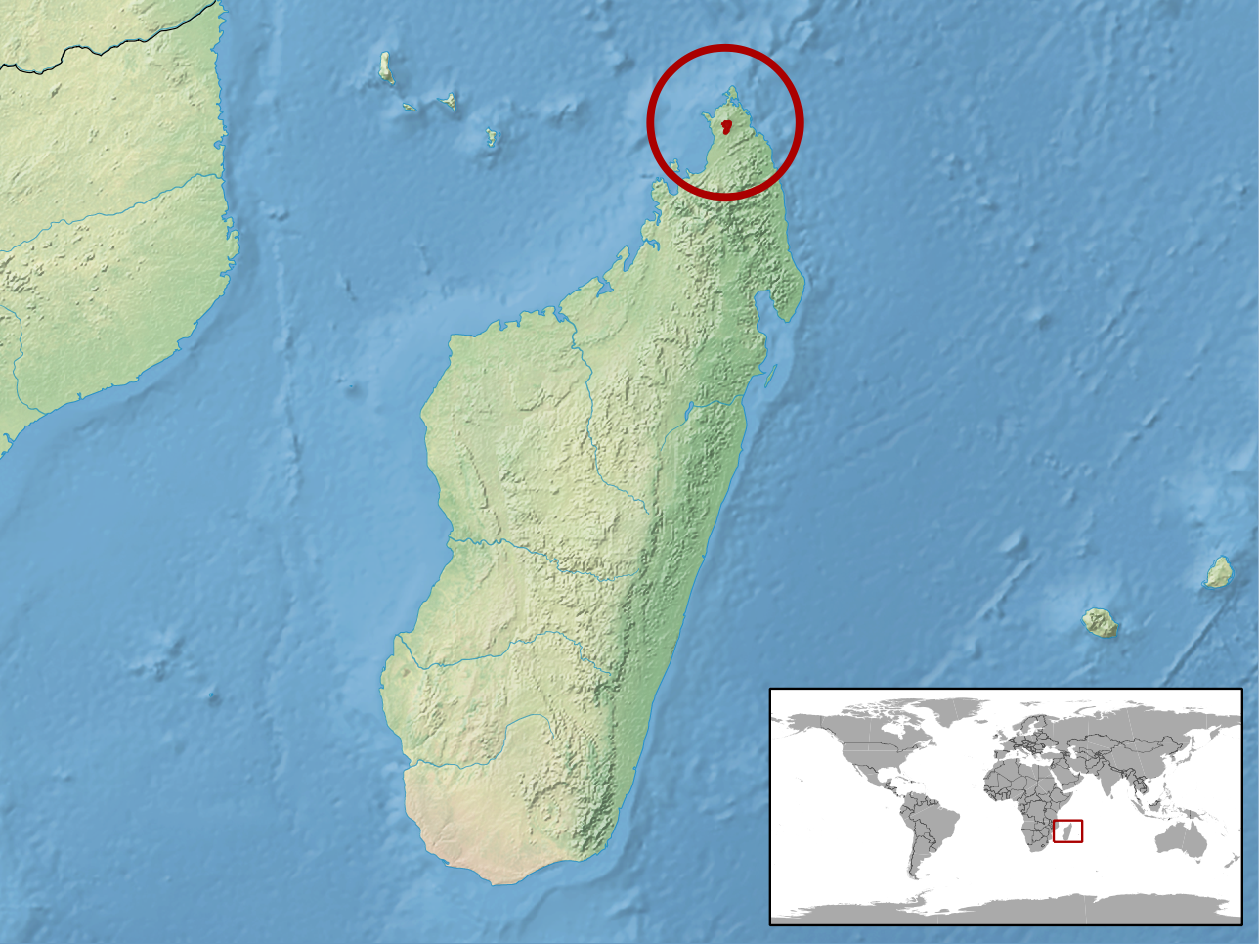

Species of lizard

Paracontias brocchii, also known commonly as the stone skink, is a species of lizard in the family Scincidae. The species is endemic to Madagascar.

== Etymology ==
The specific name, brocchii, is in honor of French naturalist Paul Louis Antoine Brocchi.

== Geographic range ==
P. brocchii is found in extreme northern Madagascar in Montagne d'Ambre National Park.

== Habitat ==
The preferred natural habitat of P. brocchii is forest, at altitudes of 900–1,250 m (2,950–4,100 ft).

== Description ==
P. brocchii has no legs and no external ear openings.

== Behavior ==
P. brocchi is terrestrial.

== Reproduction ==
The mode of reproduction of P. brocchii is unknown.
