= Jacques Millot =

French arachnologist (1897–1980)

- Born: Jacques Henri Marie Clément Millot; 9 July 1897; Beauvais
- Died: 23 January 1980 (aged 82); 16th arrondissement of Paris
- Awards: Chevalier of the Legion of Honour; Croix de guerre 1914–1918
- Academic career
- Fields: Arachnology; ichthyology; ethnology
- Position held: director (1961–1967)

Jacques Millot (9 July 1897, Beauvais – 23 January 1980, Paris) was a French arachnologist, who also made significant contributions in the fields of ichthyology and ethnology.

== Biography ==
He studied histology under Justin Marie Jolly at the Collège de France in Paris, earning his medical doctorate in 1922. In 1931 he became a professor of physiological anthropology, and in 1943, he was appointed chair of comparative anatomy at the Muséum national d’Histoire naturelle, a position he kept up until 1960. Afterwards, he was a professor of ethnology at the natural history museum as well as director of the Musée de l'Homme (1960–67).

In 1947 he was named director of the Institut scientifique de Madagasgar, and during the following year, became president of the Académie malgache (Malagasy Academy). He was a member of the Société zoologique de France; he served as its president in 1943.

== Research ==
He is best known for his anatomical and histophysiological investigations of arachnids, that included intensive studies involving the silk glands of the genus Scytodes (spitting spiders). He also described metamerization in Chelicerata, and performed systematic reviews of various spider families — Sicariidae, Pholcidae, Thomisidae and Salticidae.

In 1952 he took charge of a project to locate the coelacanth in waters surrounding the Comoros archipelago. The fish was considered to be extinct for millions of years until a chance discovery in 1938. In late September 1953, a coelacanth was caught in waters near the port city of Mutsamudu, island of Anjouan (third discovered specimen overall). In 1954, five more specimens were captured. In 1958 he published a treatise on the anatomy of the coelacanth, titled Anatomie de Latimeria chalumnae.

Taxa with the specific epithet of milloti honor his name; examples being Paracontias milloti Angel, 1949 (Nosy Mamoko skink), and Platypelis milloti Guibé, 1950 (Millot's froglet). With Lucien Berland, he described numerous species of spiders and the arachnid genera Afraflacilla and Bacelarella.

== Published works (selection) ==
He was director-founder of the Mémoires de l’Institut scientifique de Madagascar (1948) and founder of the journal Naturaliste malgache (1953).

- Contribution à l'histophysiologie des aranéides, 1926 – Contribution involving the histophysiology of spiders.
- Cicatrisation et régénération, 1931 – Cicatrization and regeneration.
- Biologie des races humaines, 1952 – Biology of the human races.
- Le troisième Coelacanthe; historique, éléments d'écologie, morphologie externe, documents divers, 1954 – The third coelacanth: historical, ecological factors, external morphology, documents.
- Anatomie de Latimeria chalumnae, 1958–1978; 3 volumes (with Jean Anthony; Daniel Robineau) – Anatomy of Latimeria chalumnae.
