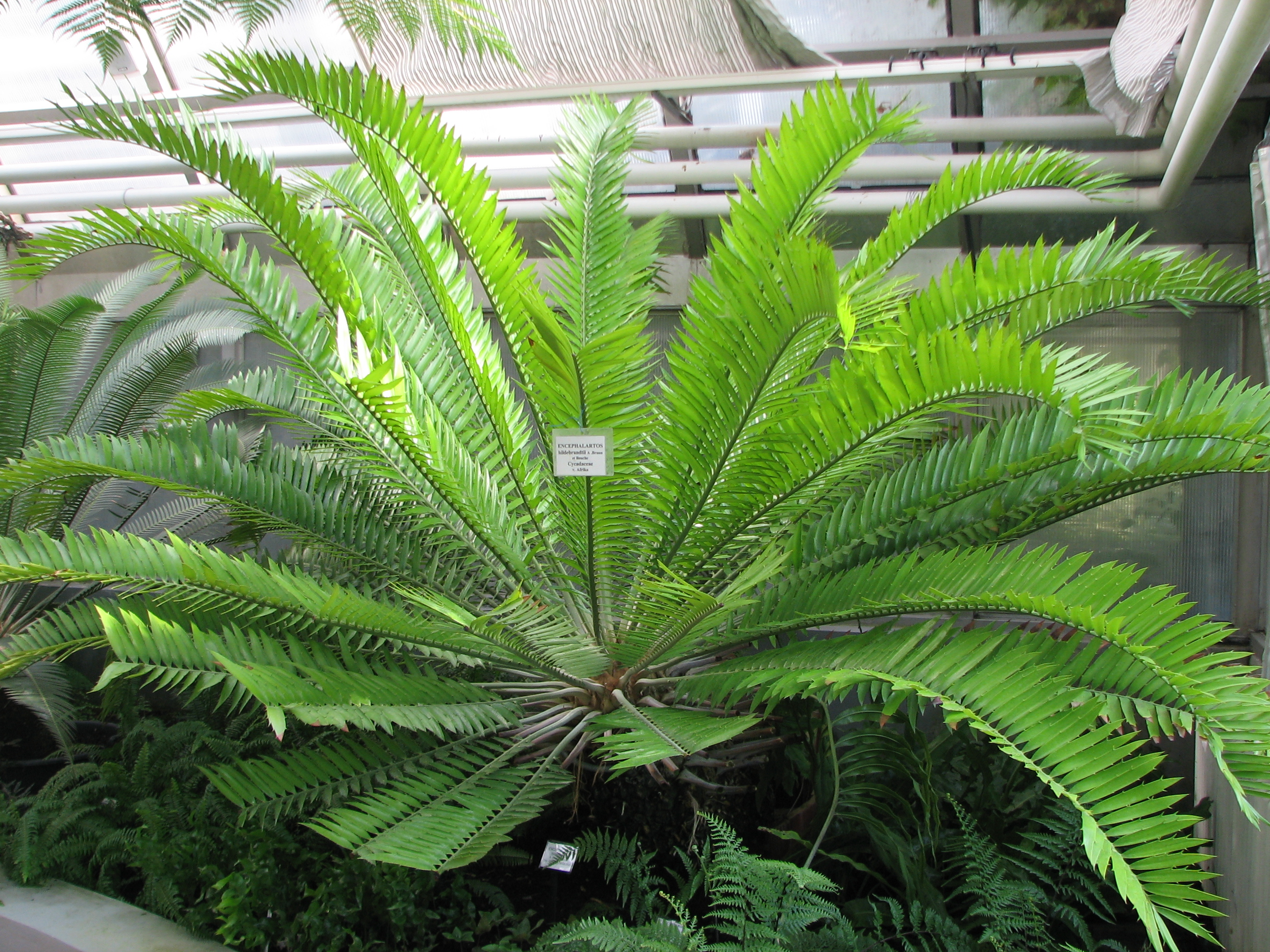

Conservation status
- Least Concern (IUCN 3.1)
- CITES Appendix I

Scientific classification
- Kingdom: Plantae
- Clade: Embryophytes
- Clade: Tracheophytes
- Clade: Spermatophytes
- Clade: Gymnosperms
- Division: Cycadophyta
- Class: Cycadopsida
- Order: Cycadales
- Family: Zamiaceae
- Genus: Encephalartos
- Species: E. hildebrandtii

Binomial name
- Encephalartos hildebrandtii A.Braun & C.D.Bouché

Synonyms
- Encephalartos villosus f. hildebrandtii (A.Braun & C.D.Bouché) Henn.; Encephalartos villosus var. nobilis T.Moore & Mast.

= Encephalartos hildebrandtii =

Species of plant

Encephalartos hildebrandtii is a species of cycad in the family Zamiaceae. It is native to Kenya and Tanzania at elevations from sea level to 600 metres (2,000 ft). The species is named for the German explorer Johann Maria Hildebrandt.

== Description ==
These cycad species reach about 6 meters (20 ft) in height with a 30 cm (12 in) diameter stem that is erect and lacks branches. The stem is covered in linear cataphyll and thick yellowish hairs. The leaves are found at the top of the stem in a crown formation and are supported by a tomentose petiole that is 1–7 cm long. Each leaf is 200–300 cm (79–118 in) long and composed of numerous lanceolate leaflets that are 20–26 cm (7.9–10.2 in) long and 28–36 mm wide. The leaflets are arranged on the spine at angles of 45-80°, with the basal leaflets reduced to thorns.

This species is dioecious, meaning it has separate male and female specimens. Male specimens produce 1-7 cylindrical-fusiform cones that are green or yellow, 20–50 cm (7.9–19.7 in) long and 5–9 cm in diameter. These cones have large, rhombic-shaped microsporophylls. Female specimens produce 1 to 4 cylindrical cones that are yellow and larger, 28–60 cm (11–24 in) long and 15–25 cm (5.9–9.8 in) broad, with rhomboid macrosporophylls.

The seeds are oblong, measuring 28–60 mm long and 15–25 cm in diameter. They are covered by a yellow-to-red sarcotesta.

== Gallery ==
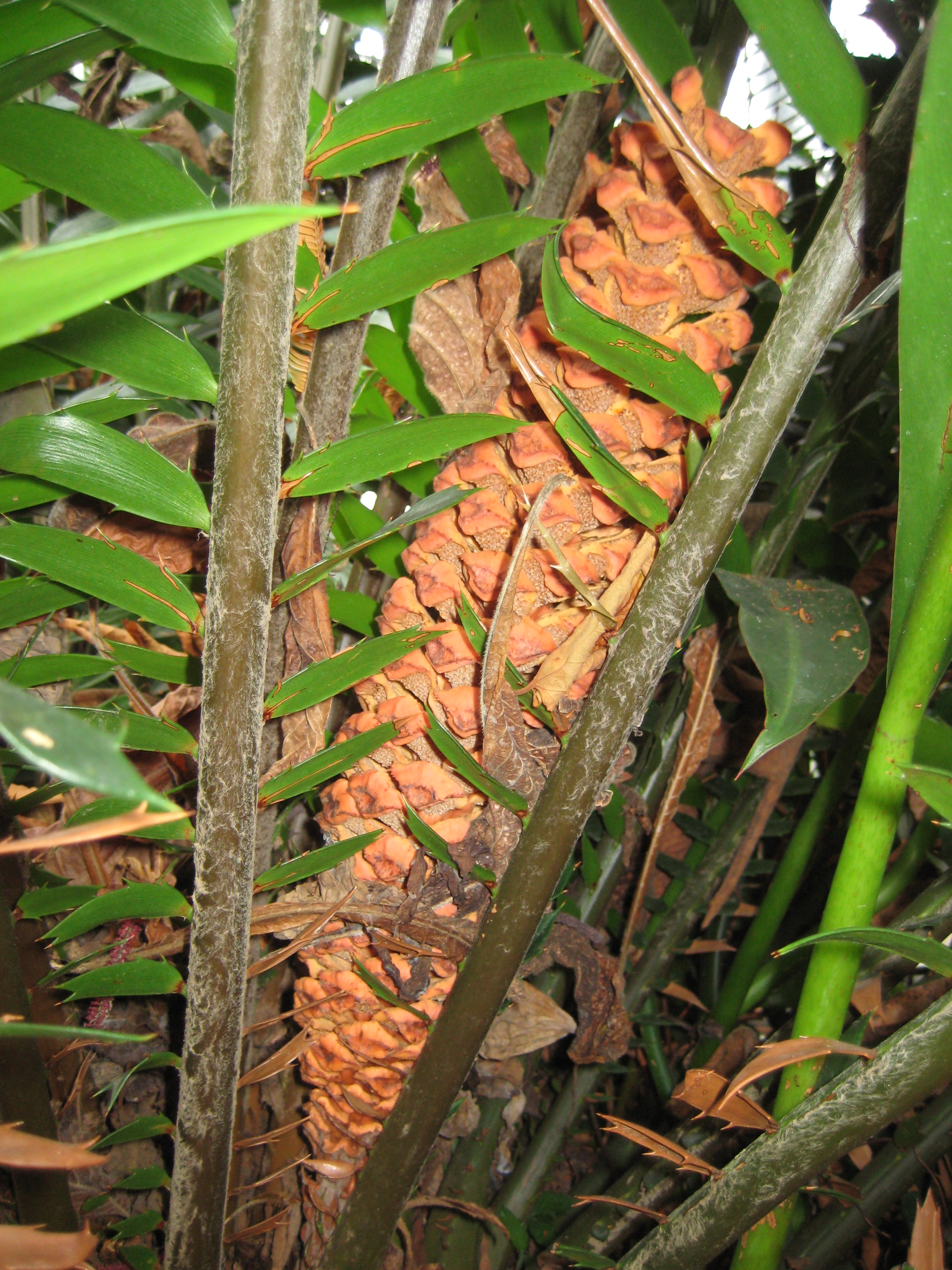
Cone

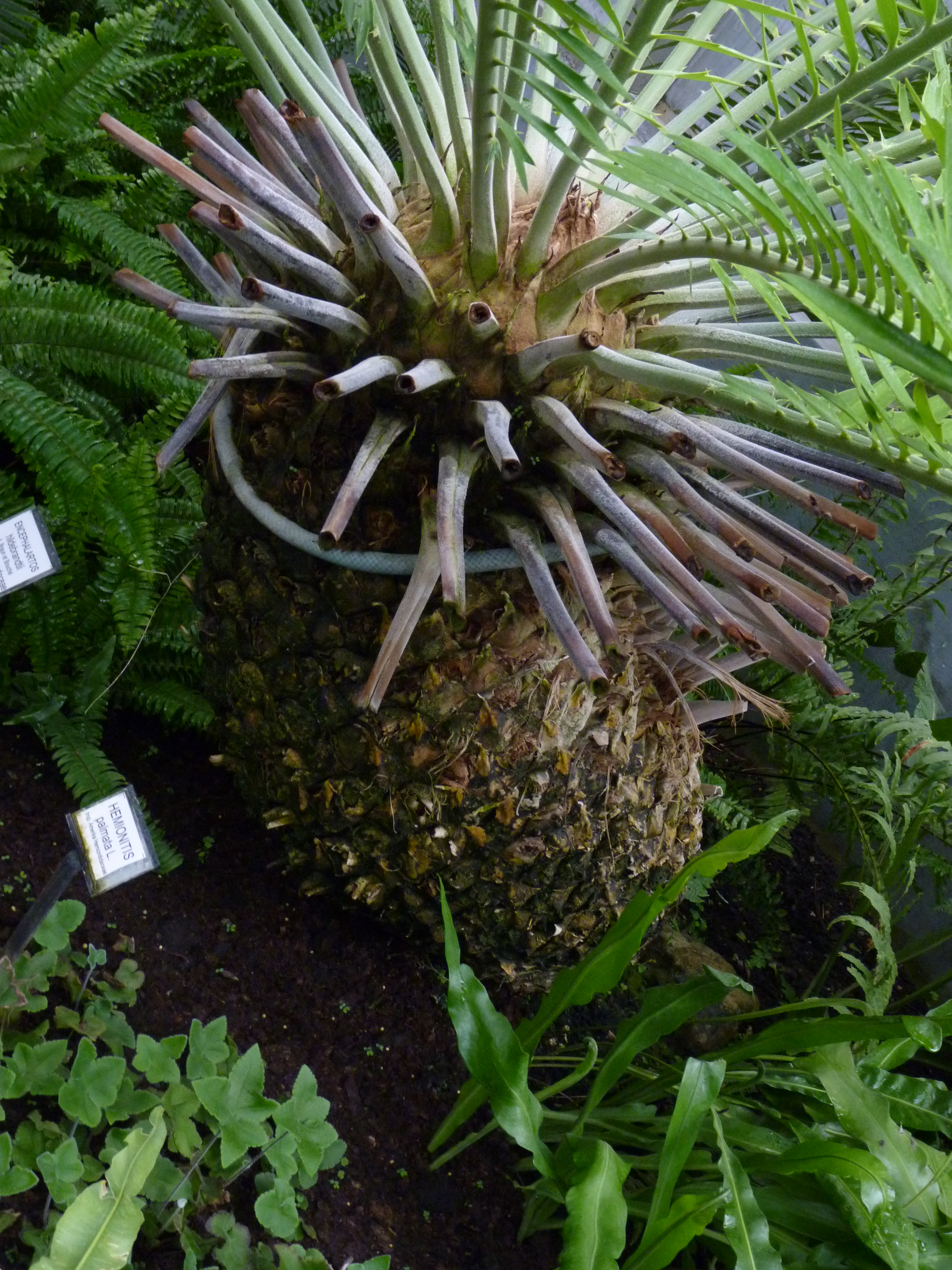
Trunk

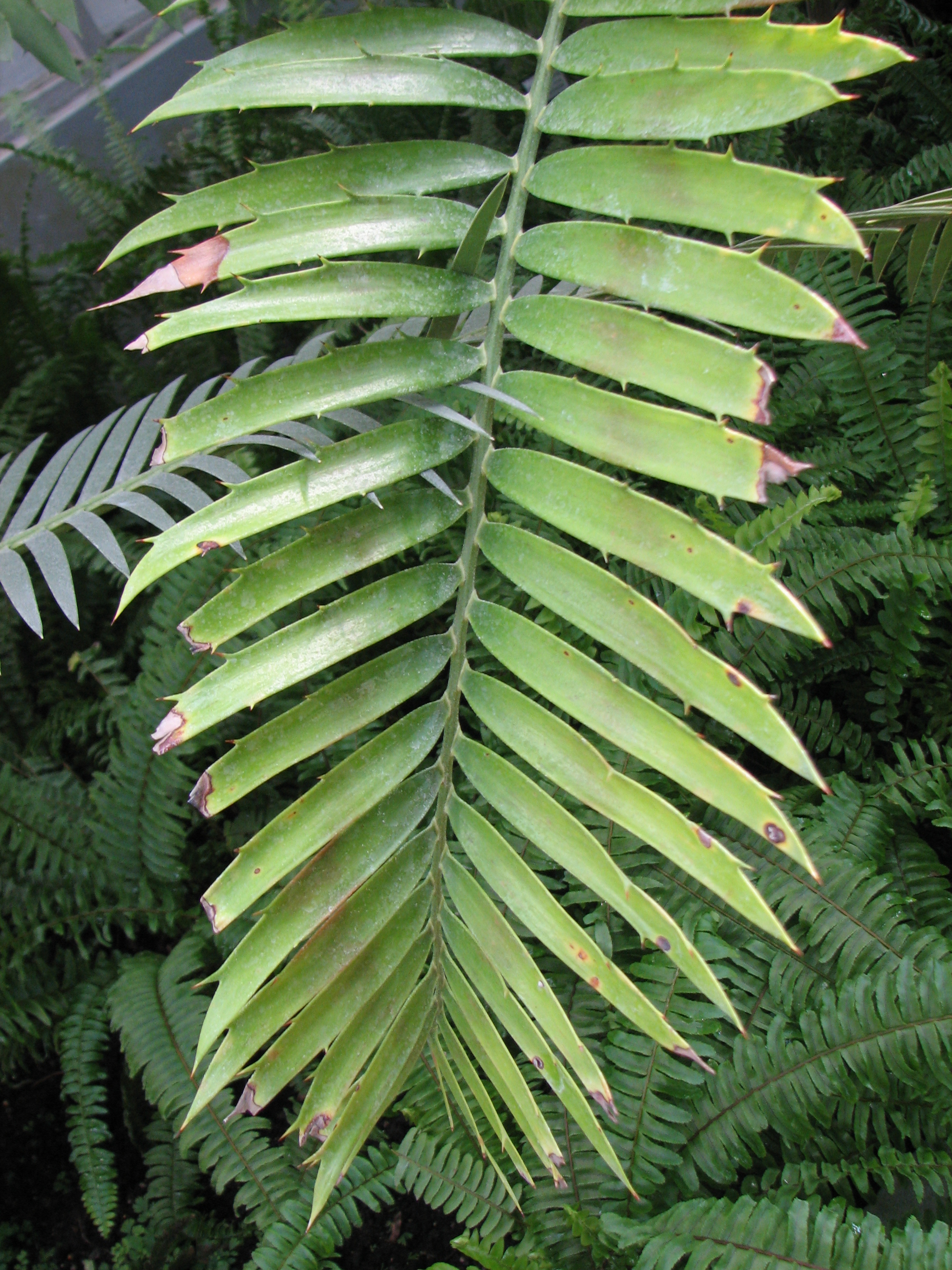
Leaves
