= Paracontias rothschildi =

Conservation status
- Critically Endangered (IUCN 3.1)

Scientific classification
- Kingdom: Animalia
- Phylum: Chordata
- Class: Reptilia
- Order: Squamata
- Suborder: Scinciformata
- Infraorder: Scincomorpha
- Family: Scincidae
- Genus: Paracontias
- Species: P. rothschildi

Binomial name
- Paracontias rothschildi (Mocquard, 1905
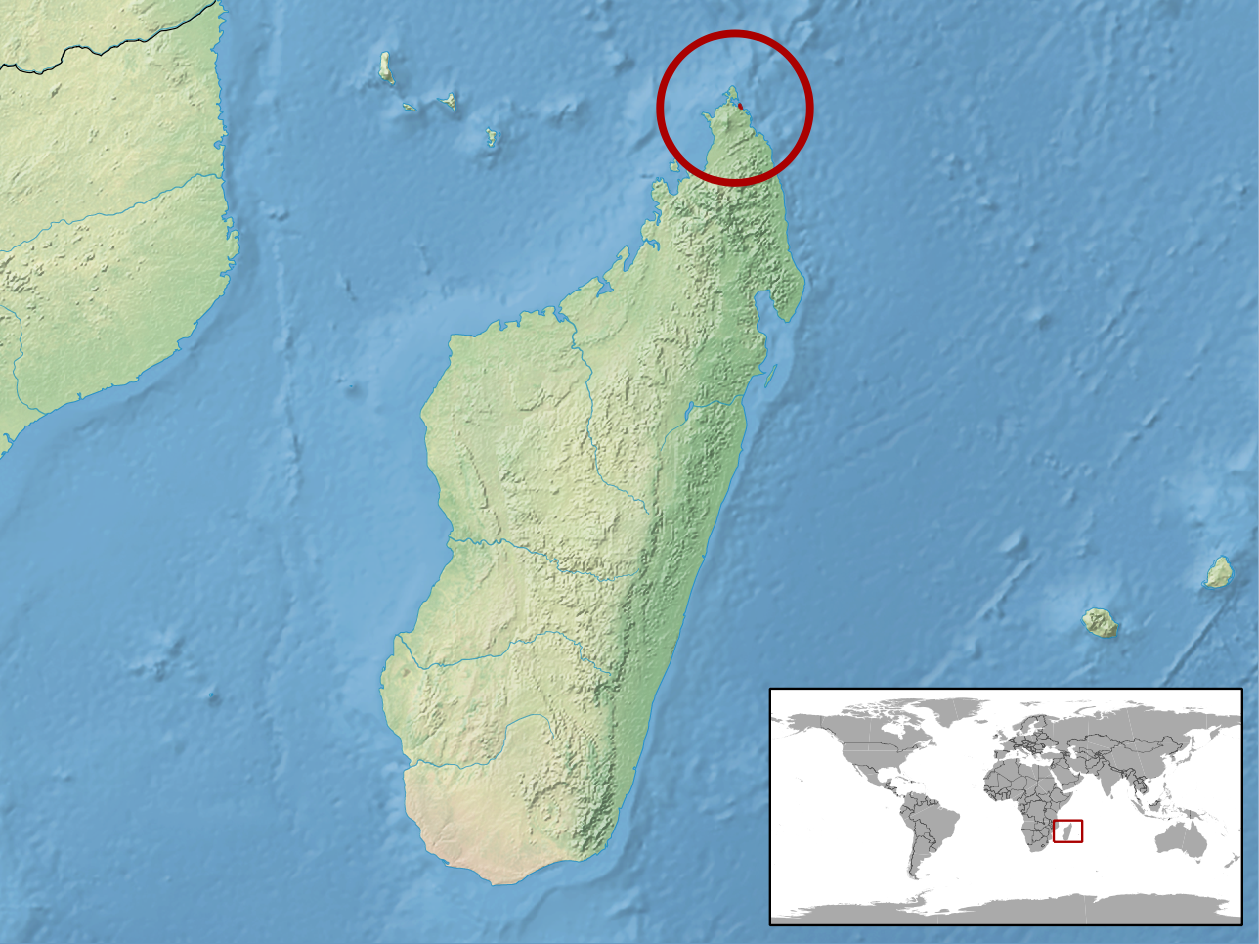

Species of lizard

Rothschild's skink (Paracontias rothschildi) is a species of skinks. It is endemic to Madagascar.
