= Paracontias vermisaurus =

Conservation status
- Data Deficient (IUCN 3.1)

Scientific classification
- Kingdom: Animalia
- Phylum: Chordata
- Class: Reptilia
- Order: Squamata
- Family: Scincidae
- Genus: Paracontias
- Species: P. vermisaurus

Binomial name
- Paracontias vermisaurus Miralles, Köhler, Vieites, Glaw, & Vences, 2011
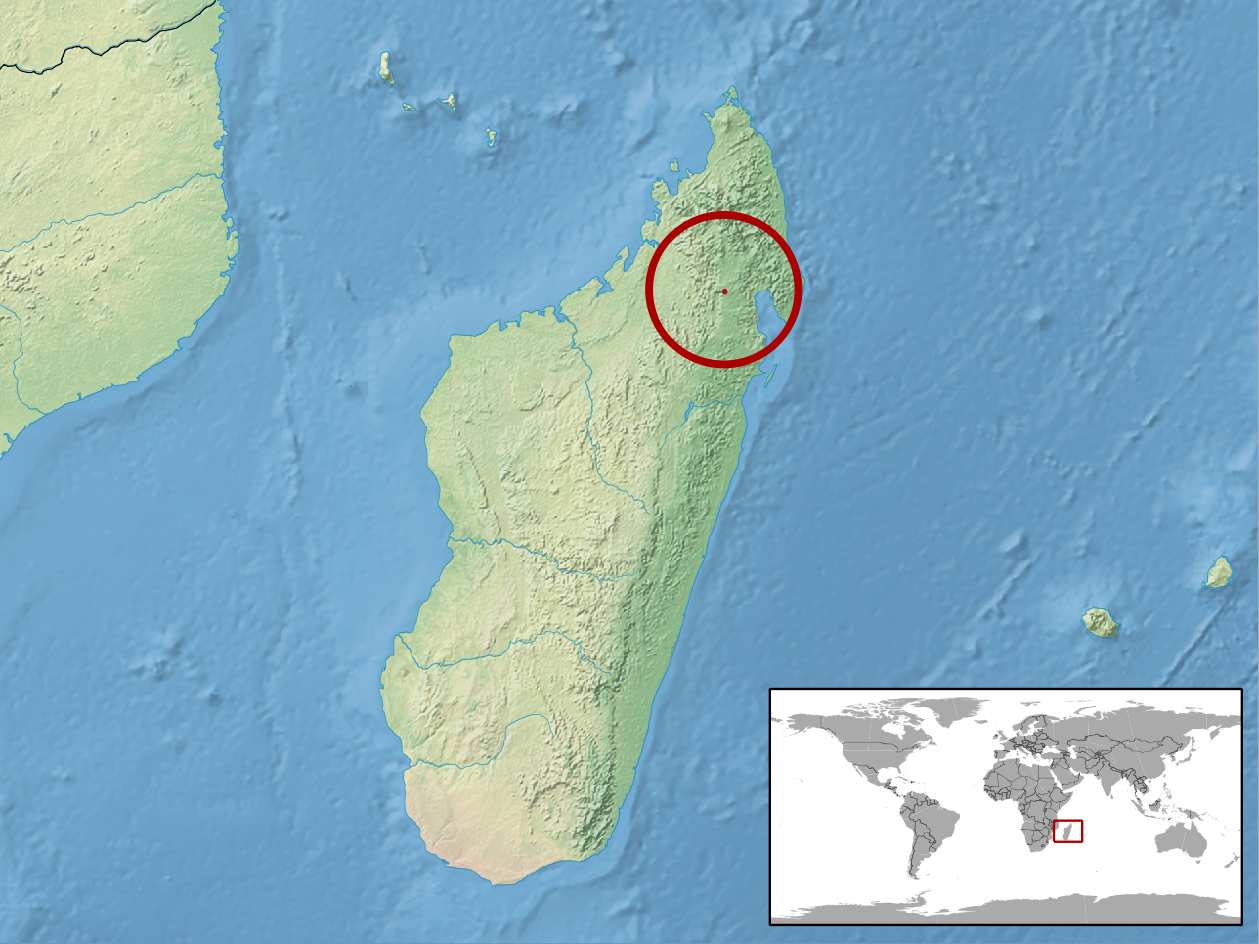

Species of lizard

Paracontias vermisaurus is a species of skinks. It is endemic to Madagascar.
