= Paracontias fasika =

Conservation status
- Critically Endangered (IUCN 3.1)

Scientific classification
- Kingdom: Animalia
- Phylum: Chordata
- Class: Reptilia
- Order: Squamata
- Family: Scincidae
- Genus: Paracontias
- Species: P. fasika

Binomial name
- Paracontias fasika Köhler, Vences, Erbacher, & Glaw, 2010
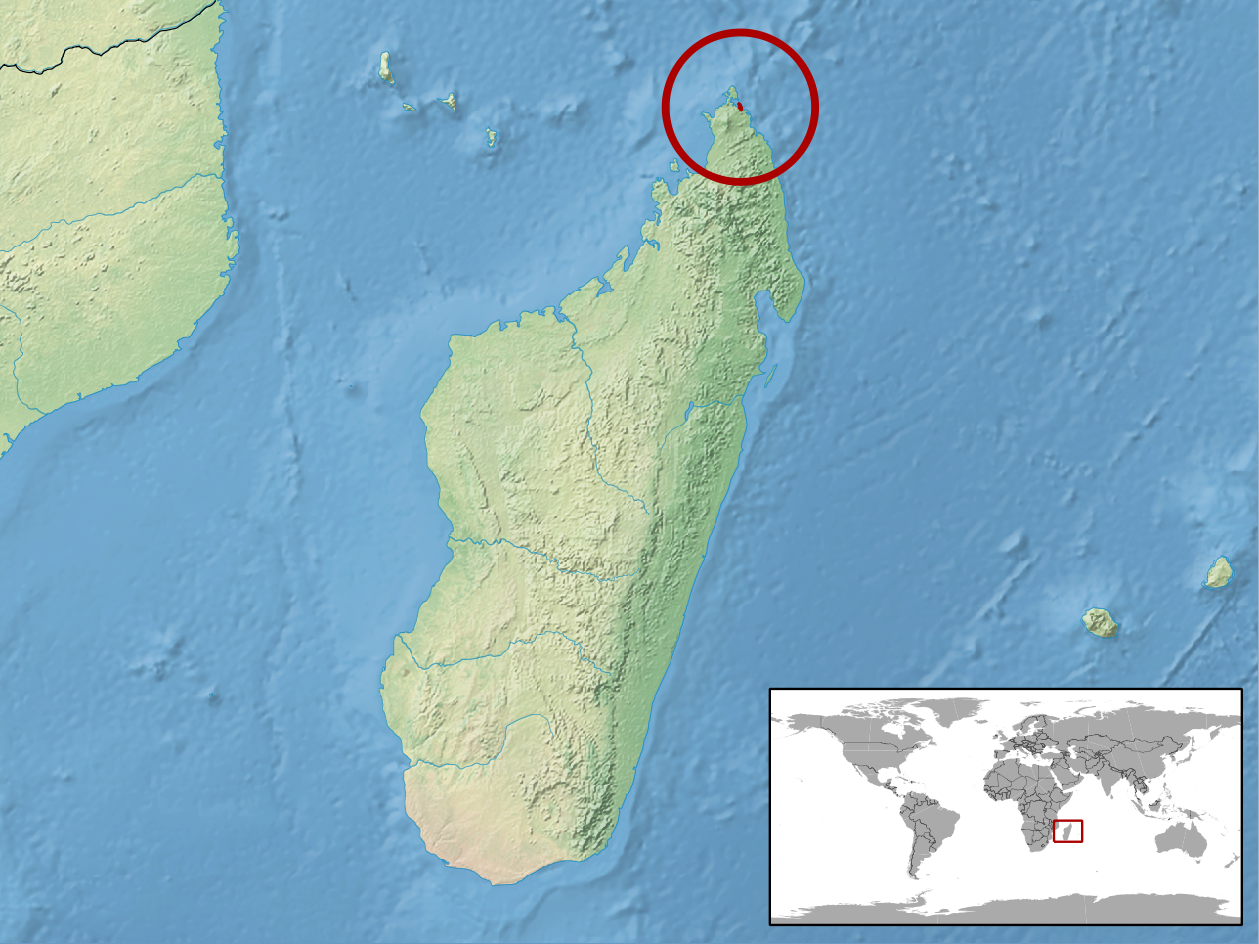

Species of lizard

Paracontias fasika is a species of skinks. It is endemic to Madagascar.
