= Paracontias tsararano =

Conservation status
- Data Deficient (IUCN 3.1)

Scientific classification
- Kingdom: Animalia
- Phylum: Chordata
- Class: Reptilia
- Order: Squamata
- Family: Scincidae
- Genus: Paracontias
- Species: P. tsararano

Binomial name
- Paracontias tsararano Andreone & Greer, 2002
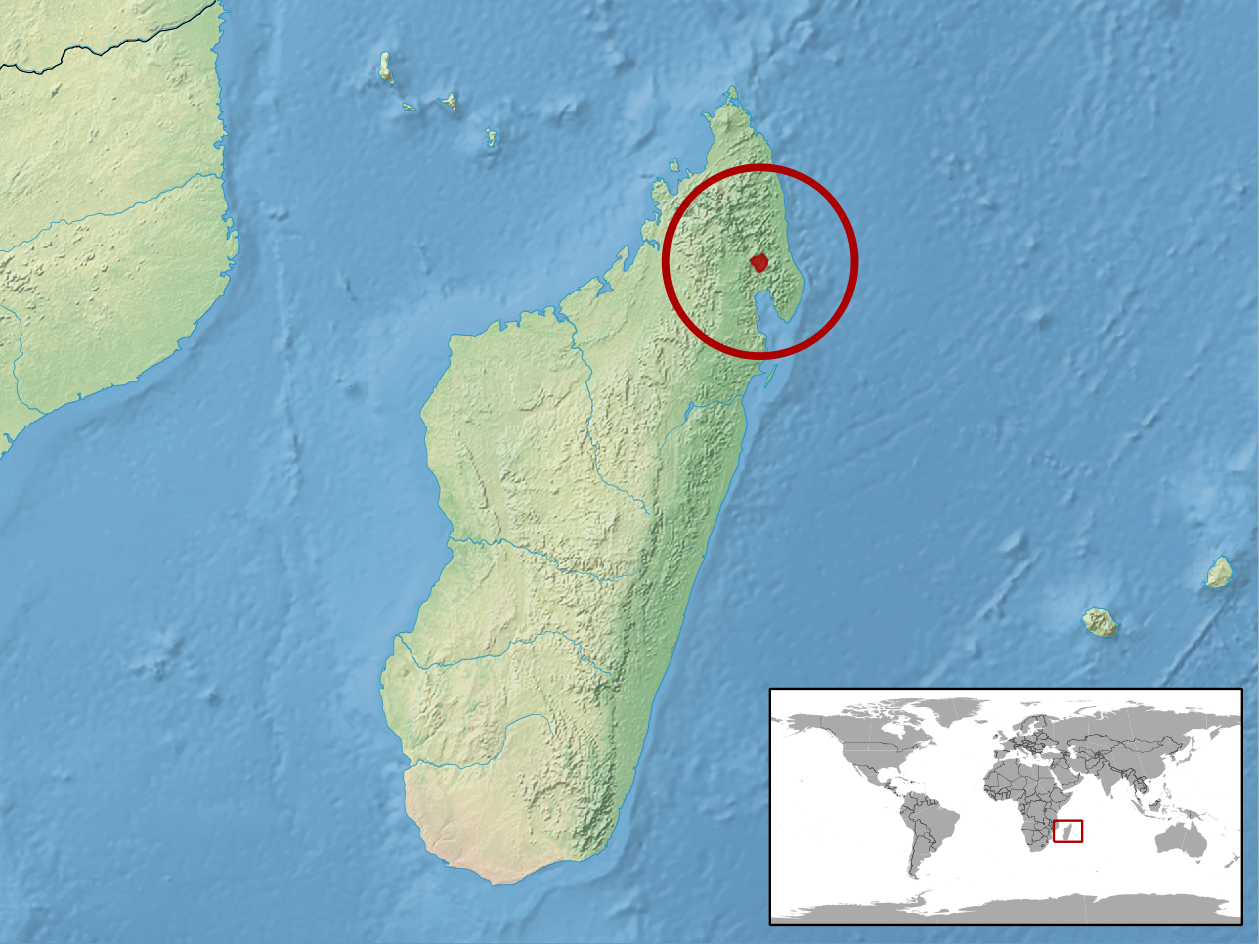

Species of lizard

Paracontias tsararano is a species of skinks. It is endemic to Madagascar. The name is believed to have come from the Malagasy word "tsararano", meaning "good water".

== Habitat ==
Paracontias tsararano is native to the Tsararano Forest in North-Eastern Madagascar. The skink lives mostly underground in burrows, with its diet consisting mainly of insects, such as flies, crickets and beetles. There is an estimated population of 235.
