= Paul Brocchi =

Paul Louis Antoine Brocchi (2 May 1838 – 12 August 1898) was a French naturalist and agronomist born in Nancy.

In 1875, he received his degree in science at the Sorbonne with a thesis on decapods under the guidance of Henri Milne-Edwards (1800–1885). For 25 years he taught classes at the École pratique des hautes études, and was successor to Émile Blanchard (1819–1900) at the Institut national agronomique. In July 1898 he became a member of the Legion of Honour.

During his career he described numerous zoological taxa, and performed extensive investigations in the fields of aquaculture, apiculture, sericulture and livestock raising. He also studied oyster farming and the anatomy of crustaceans.

Brocchi was the author of the "amphibian section" in Auguste Duméril's "Mission scientifique au Mexique et dans l'Amérique Centrale". He also wrote a noted treatise on pisciculture titled "La pisciculture dans les eaux douces" (1898).

A species of lizard, Paracontias brocchii, is named in his honor.
