= Paracontias =

Scientific classification
- Kingdom: Animalia
- Phylum: Chordata
- Class: Reptilia
- Order: Squamata
- Family: Scincidae
- Subfamily: Scincinae
- Genus: Paracontias; Mocquard, 1894

Species
- 14, see text.

Genus of lizards

Paracontias is a genus of skinks, lizards in the family Scincidae. The genus is endemic to Madagascar.

== Taxonomy and systematics ==
Paracontias is usually placed in the subfamily Scincinae, which seems to be paraphyletic however. Probably quite close to Amphiglossus and possibly Androngo trivittatus, it belongs to a major clade which does not seem to include the type genus Scincus. Thus, it will probably be eventually assigned to a new, yet-to-be-named subfamily. (Austin & Arnold 2006)

== Species ==
The following 14 species are recognized as being valid.

- Paracontias ampijoroensis Miralles, Jono, Mori, Gandola, Erens, J. Köhler, Glaw & Vences, 2016
- Paracontias brocchii Mocquard, 1894 – stone skink
- Paracontias fasika J. Köhler, Vences, Erbacher & Glaw, 2010
- Paracontias hafa Andreone & Greer, 2002
- Paracontias hildebrandti (W. Peters, 1880) – Hildebrand's skink
- Paracontias holomelas (Günther, 1877) – Anzahamaru skink
- Paracontias kankana J. Köhler, Vieites, Glaw, Kaffenberger & Vences, 2009
- Paracontias mahamavo Miralles, Jono, Mori, Gandola, Erens, J. Köhler, Glaw & Vences, 2016
- Paracontias manify Andreone & Greer, 2002
- Paracontias milloti Angel, 1949 – Nosy Mamoko skink
- Paracontias minimus (Mocquard,1906)
- Paracontias rothschildi Mocquard, 1905 – Rothschild's skink
- Paracontias tsararano Andreone & Greer, 2002
- Paracontias vermisaurus Miralles, J. Köhler, Vieites, Glaw & Vences, 2011

Nota bene: A binomial authority in parentheses indicates that the species was originally described in a genus other than Paracontias.
