= Paracontias hafa =

Conservation status
- Near Threatened (IUCN 3.1)

Scientific classification
- Kingdom: Animalia
- Phylum: Chordata
- Class: Reptilia
- Order: Squamata
- Suborder: Scinciformata
- Infraorder: Scincomorpha
- Family: Scincidae
- Genus: Paracontias
- Species: P. hafa

Binomial name
- Paracontias hafa Andreone & Greer, 2002
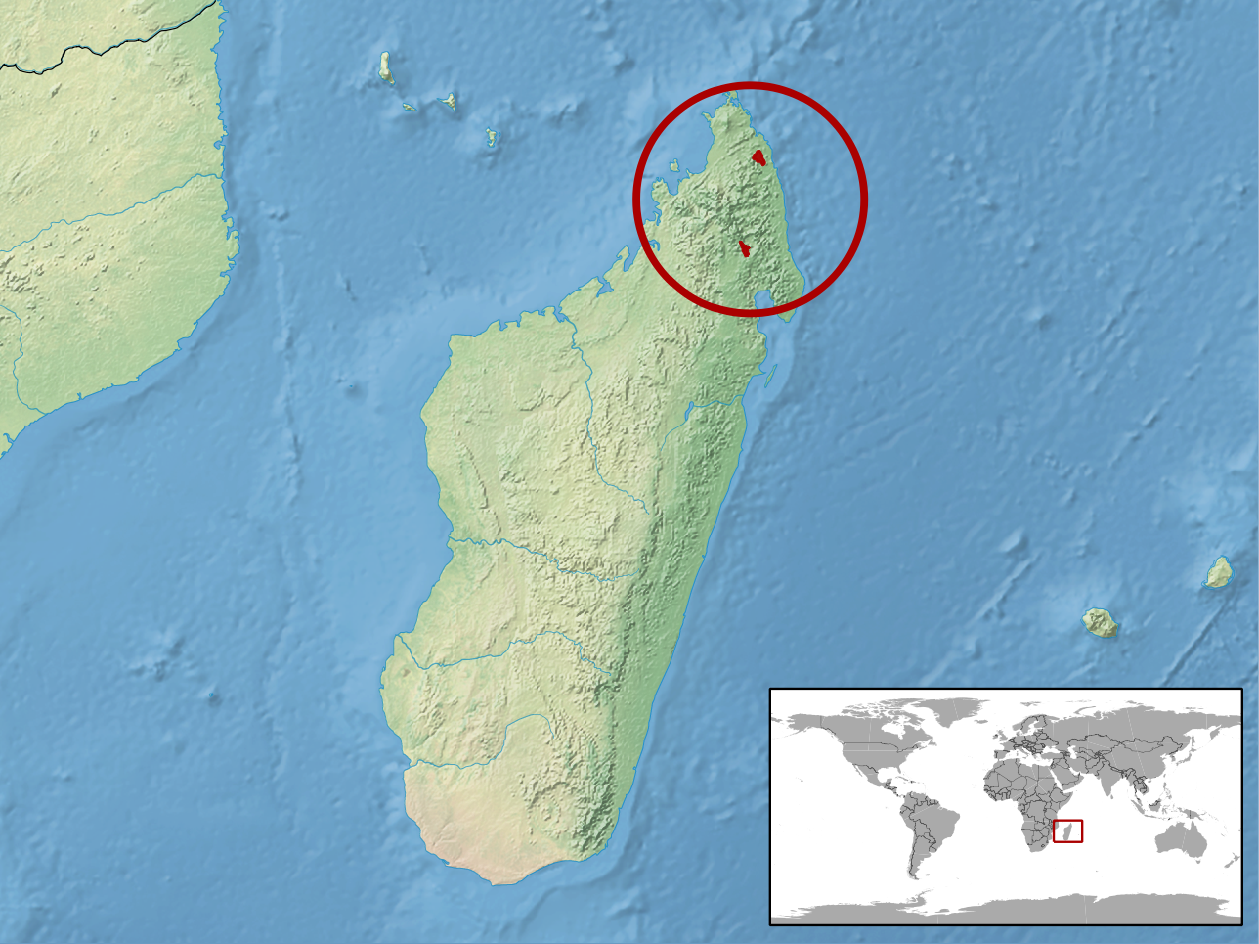

Species of lizard

Paracontias hafa is a species of skinks. It is endemic to Madagascar.
