= Paracontias hildebrandti =

Conservation status
- Least Concern (IUCN 3.1)

Scientific classification
- Kingdom: Animalia
- Phylum: Chordata
- Class: Reptilia
- Order: Squamata
- Family: Scincidae
- Genus: Paracontias
- Species: P. hildebrandti

Binomial name
- Paracontias hildebrandti (W. Peters, 1880)
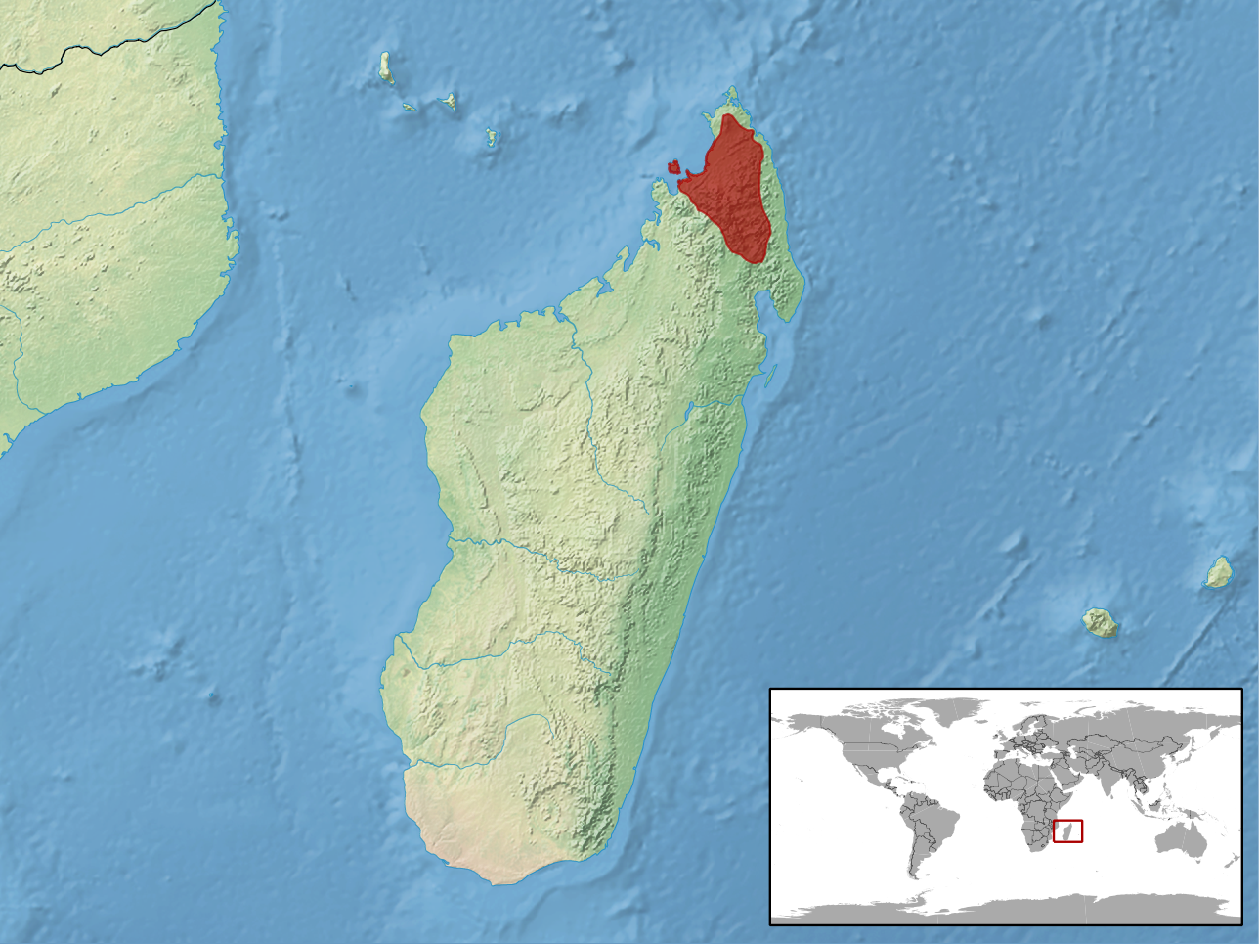

Synonyms
- Acontias hildebrandti W. Peters, 1880; Malacontias hildebrandti — Greer, 1970; Paracontias hildebrandti — Brygoo, 1980

Species of lizard

Paracontias hildebrandti, also known commonly as Hildebrand's skink and Hildebrandt's skink, is a species of lizard in the family Scincidae. The species is endemic to Madagascar.

== Etymology ==
The specific name, hildebrandti, is in honor of German botanist Johann Maria Hildebrandt.

== Geographic range ==
P. hildebrandti is found in northern Madagascar, including the island of Nosy Be.

== Habitat ==
The preferred natural habitat of P. hildebrandti is forest, at altitudes from sea level to 1,500 m (4,900 ft), but it may also be found in disturbed areas such as cacao plantations.

== Description ==
P. hildebrandti has no legs, and it has no external ear openings.

== Reproduction ==
P. hildebrandti is oviparous.
