= Trapezocephalus ndumoensis =

Scientific classification
- Kingdom: Animalia
- Phylum: Arthropoda
- Subphylum: Chelicerata
- Class: Arachnida
- Order: Araneae
- Infraorder: Araneomorphae
- Family: Salticidae
- Genus: Trapezocephalus
- Species: T. ndumoensis

Binomial name
- Trapezocephalus ndumoensis Wesołowska & Haddad, 2013

Synonyms
- Heliophanus ndumoensis Wesołowska & Haddad, 2013

Species of spider

Trapezocephalus ndumoensis is a jumping spider species in the genus Heliophanus that lives in South Africa. It was first identified in 2013.
