= Johann Maria Hildebrandt =

German explorer, collector, and scientist (1847–1881)

- Born: 13 or 19 March 1847; Düsseldorf, Germany
- Died: 29 May 1881 (aged 34); Madagascar
- Occupations: Explorer; collector; scientist

Johann Maria Hildebrandt (born 13 or 19 March 1847; died 29 May 1881) was a German explorer, collector, and scientist.

== Biography ==
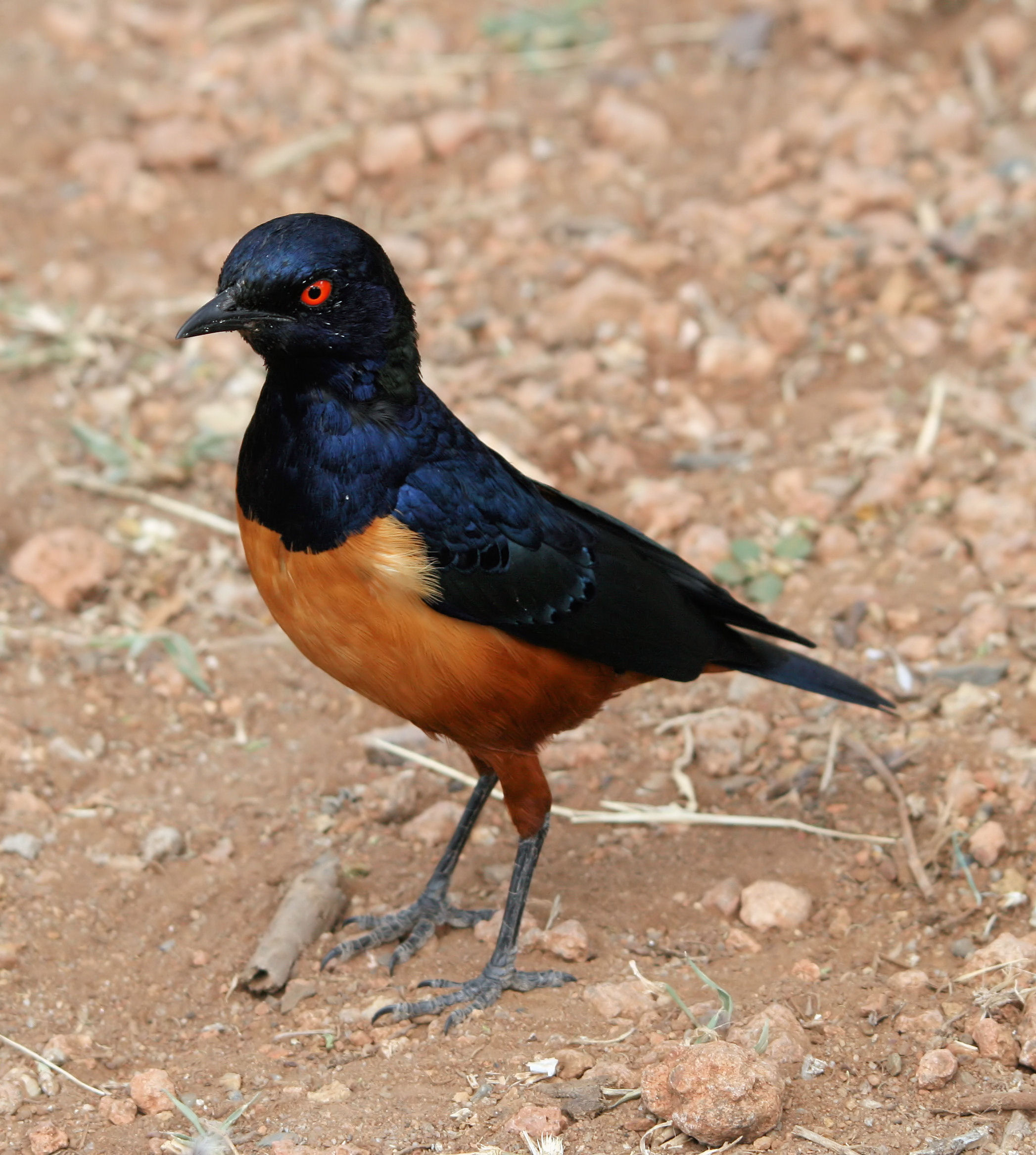
Hildebrandt's starling

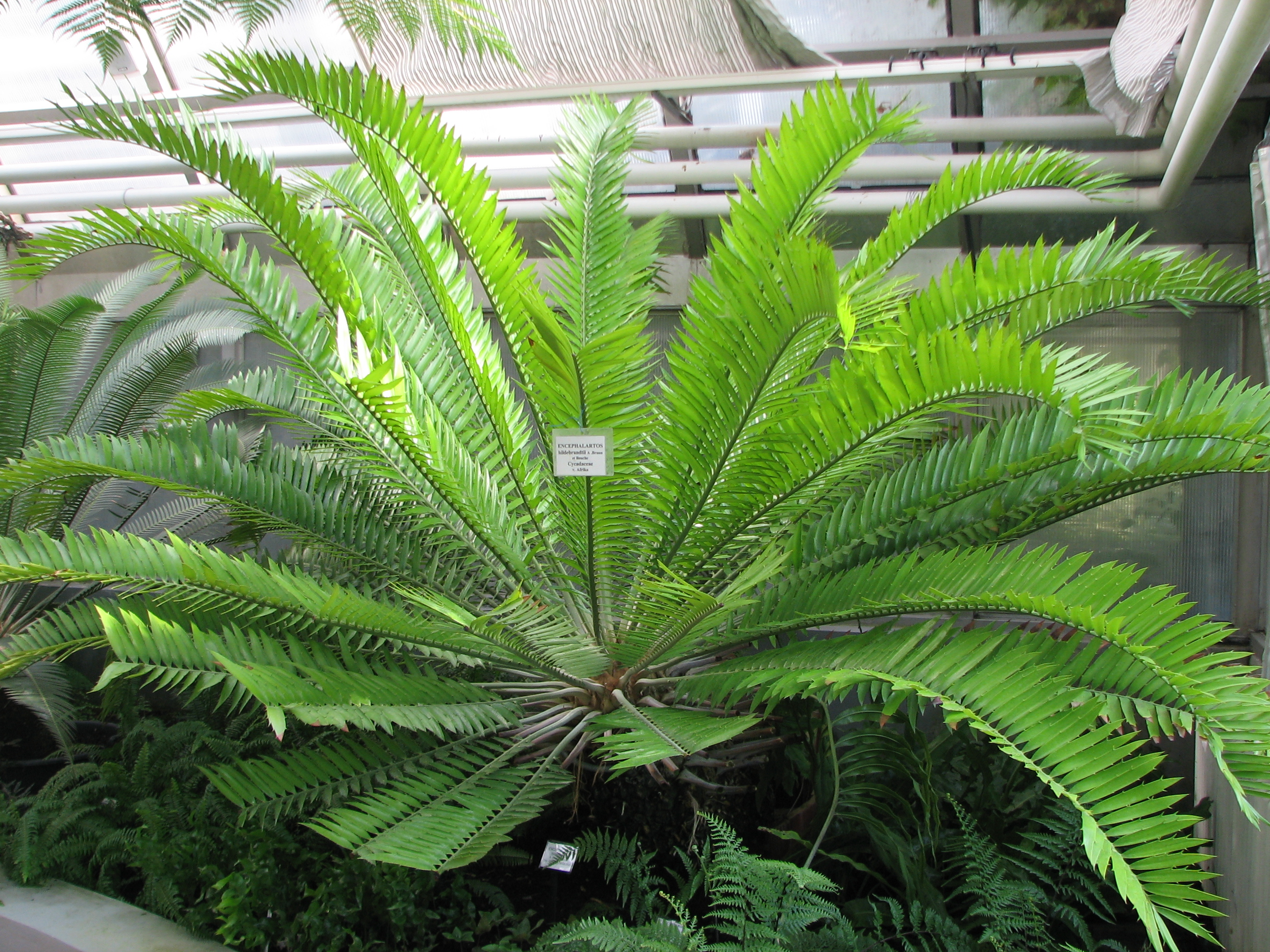
Encephalartos hildebrandtii

Hildebrandt was born in Düsseldorf, Germany, to a family of painters. Originally a machine maker, he lost an eye after an accident and became a gardener, eventually starting work in 1869 for the Berlin Botanical Garden. Between 1872 and 1881, Hildebrandt made a number of expeditions to the Horn of Africa and the African Great Lakes, collecting a large number of botanical and zoological specimens. His expeditions were for the most part modest affairs, but he discovered a number of new species. He also lectured widely and wrote about many aspects of the places he visited.

Hildebrandt died of a fever and stomach bleeding whilst on an expedition to Madagascar and was buried in the Norwegian Cemetery in Ambatovinaky. He gave his name to a number of species, including Hildebrandt's starling (Lamprotornis hildebrandti), the cycad Encephalartos hildebrandtii and Hildebrandt's spurfowl (Pternistis hildebrandti), all of which he discovered in Kenya in the African Great Lakes region. Hildebrandt is commemorated in the scientific names of three species of reptiles: Hemirhagerrhis hildebrandtii, Paracontias hildebrandti, and Trachylepis hildebrandtii. One frog genus, Hildebrandtia, bears his name.
