= Peter Uetz =

German biologist and herpetologist

- Born: 11 June 1965 (age 61); Untergruppenbach, Germany
- Education: University of Stuttgart, University of Heidelberg
- Known for: Founder of The Reptile Database; research on microbial systems biology and protein interactions
- Scientific career
- Fields: Systems biology, Molecular biology, Herpetology
- Workplaces: European Molecular Biology Laboratory (EMBL), University of Washington, J. Craig Venter Institute, Virginia Commonwealth University
- Author abbrev. (zoology): Uetz

Peter Uetz (born 11 June 1965) is a German biologist. His research focuses on microbial systems biology, molecular biology, and herpetology.

== Biography ==
=== Early life and education ===
Uetz attended elementary school in Untergruppenbach and the Robert-Mayer-Gymnasium Heilbronn, completing his Abitur in 1985. In 1982, he published his first popular-science report on the reproductive biology of chameleons as part of the Baden-Württemberg state competition of Jugend forscht. In 1987, together with Gunther Köhler, he co-founded the Working Group on iguanas within the German Society for Herpetology and Herpetoculture (DGHT) and launched the journal Iguana.

From 1985 to 1986, he studied biology at the University of Stuttgart, where he earned his preliminary diploma. In 1986, he developed a computer program for molecular genetics, which won fifth place in the national Jugend forscht competition in biology.

From 1987 to 1988, he completed his civilian service at the Institute for Immunology at the University of Heidelberg. He continued his studies at the University of Tübingen in 1989 and later at Heidelberg, where he graduated in 1993 with a diploma thesis on the 5-HT3 receptor gene of mice, conducted at the Max Planck Institute for Medical Research in Heidelberg.

In 1997, he earned his Ph.D. (Dr. rer. nat.) in developmental biology at the European Molecular Biology Laboratory (EMBL), University of Heidelberg, with a dissertation titled Biochemical Studies on the Limb Deformity Protein of Vertebrates. His doctoral work produced two publications on protein–protein interactions and molecular biology.

=== Career ===
In November 1995, Uetz co-founded the EMBL Reptile Database with Thure Etzold, a comprehensive online database of reptile taxonomy. As of December 2022, it included data on more than 11,900 species. His collaborators include Jakob Hallermann, Jiří Hošek, and a 34-member advisory board with scientists such as Aaron M. Bauer, Frank Glaw, Larry Lee Grismer, Miguel Vences, Sebastian Lotzkat, and Thomas Ziegler.

Following a postdoctoral fellowship at the University of Washington in Seattle, Uetz became an associate professor at the J. Craig Venter Institute (JCVI) in Rockville, Maryland in 2006. In June 2007, he completed his habilitation at the Karlsruhe Institute of Technology (then University of Karlsruhe). Since October 2011, he has been an associate professor at the Center for the Study of Biological Complexity, Virginia Commonwealth University (VCU), in Richmond, Virginia.

His research areas include microbial interactomics, the interactomes of viruses and bacteriophages, bioinformatics of protein networks, protein–protein interactions, protein complexes, protein domains, and the biodiversity of reptiles.

=== Science communication ===
Uetz has engaged in public discussions on evolution and creationism, including a 2026 article published in Free Inquiry addressing claims made by chemist James Tour.

== Eponyms ==
Two reptile species have been named in his honor:

- The chameleon Calumma uetzi from Madagascar (2018).
- The pit viper Trimeresurus uetzi from Myanmar (2023).

== Selected publications ==
- Uetz, P. (1997). Biochemical studies on the limb deformity protein of vertebrates. Doctoral thesis, University of Heidelberg.
- Uetz, P., Abdelatty, F., Villarroel, A., Rappold, G., & Weiss, B. (1994). "Organization of the murine 5-HT3 receptor gene and assignment to human chromosome 11." FEBS Letters 339(3): 302–306.
- Uetz, P. & Zeller, R. (1996). "Vectors for expression of protein-A-tagged proteins in vertebrate cells." Analytical Biochemistry 237(1): 161–163.
- Uetz, P. et al. (1996). "Molecular interaction between limb deformity proteins (formins) and Src family kinases." The Journal of Biological Chemistry 271(52): 33525–33530.
