= Calumma andringitraense =

Conservation status
- Endangered (IUCN 3.1)

Scientific classification
- Kingdom: Animalia
- Phylum: Chordata
- Class: Reptilia
- Order: Squamata
- Suborder: Iguania
- Family: Chamaeleonidae
- Genus: Calumma
- Species: C. andringitraense

Binomial name
- Calumma andringitraense (Brygoo, Blanc & Domergue, 1972)
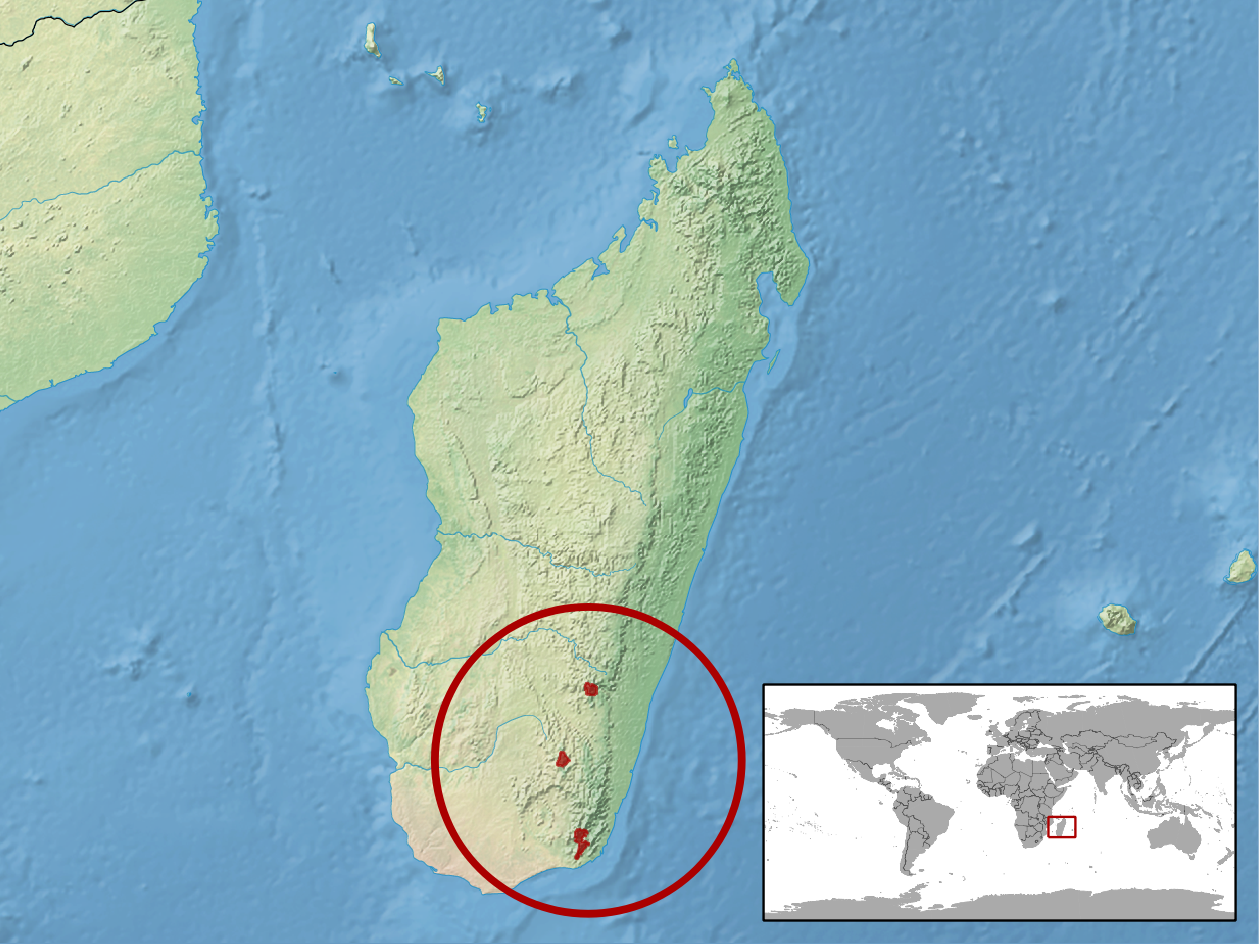
- Range of Calumma andringitraense

Synonyms
- Chamaeleo gastrotaenia andringitraensis Brygoo, C. Blanc & Domergue, 1972; Calumma gastrotaenia andringitraensis — Klaver & Böhme, 1997; Calumma andringitraensis — Böhme, 1997; Calumma andringitraense — N. Lutzmann & H. Lutzmann, 2004

Species of lizard

Calumma andringitraense is a species of chameleon endemic to Madagascar. It was originally considered a subspecies of Calumma gastrotaenia, the Perinet chameleon.

== Distribution and habitat ==
Calumma andringitraense has a geographic range of only 1,220 square kilometers (471 square miles) in southeastern Madagascar. It is known to inhabit Andohahela National Park, Andringitra National Park, and Kalambatritra Reserve; this fragmented distribution may be a result of the species' narrow preferences of habitat. For the most part, it is restricted to intact, relatively high-altitude humid forests.

== Conservation and threats ==
Due to its small and fragmented range and ongoing habitat loss, Calumma andringitraense is listed as endangered by the International Union for Conservation of Nature. Perhaps as a result of its limited population and other factors, illegal trade in it is virtually nonexistent. The population of the species is decreasing.
