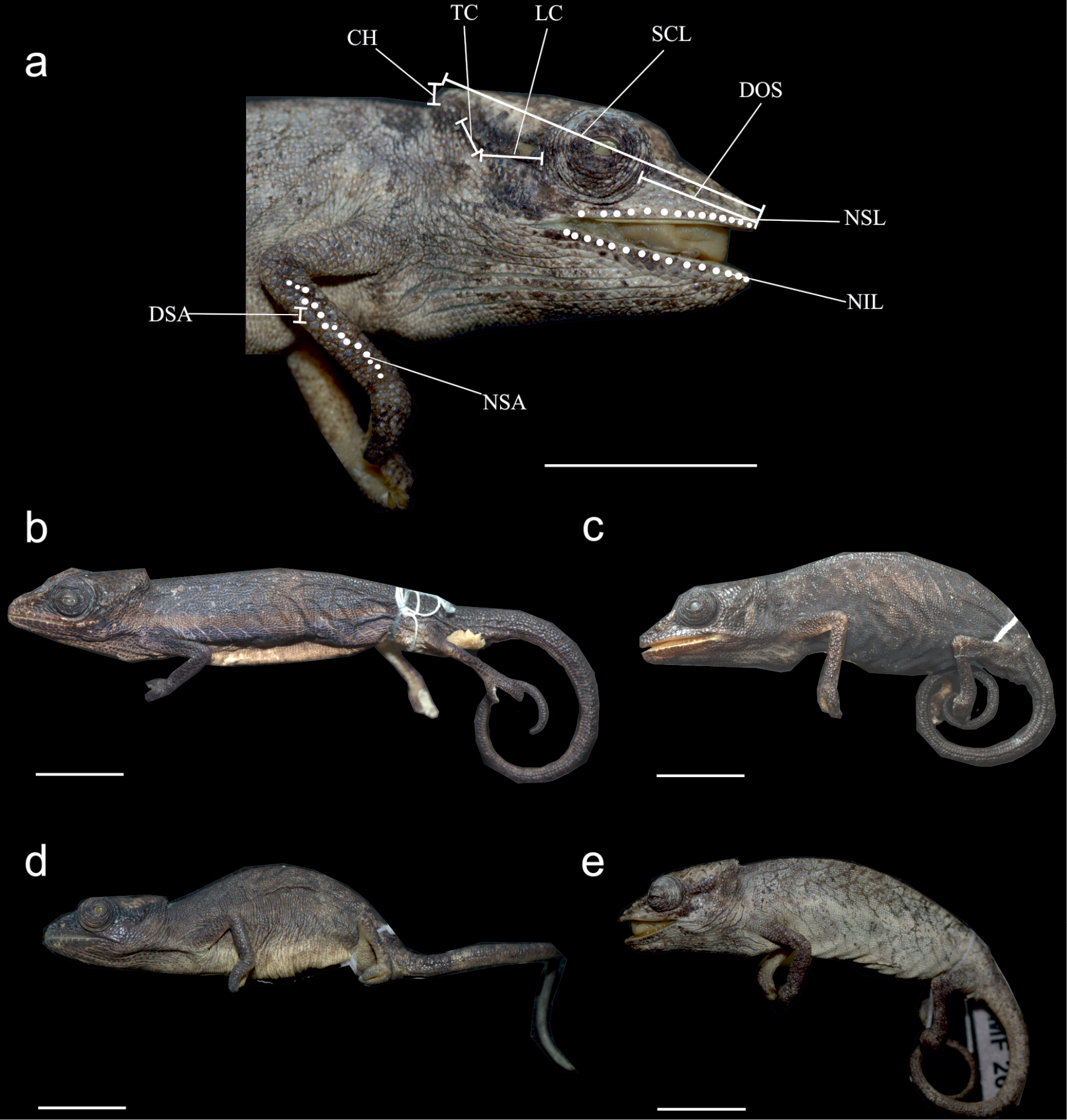

Scientific classification
- Kingdom: Animalia
- Phylum: Chordata
- Class: Reptilia
- Order: Squamata
- Suborder: Iguania
- Family: Chamaeleonidae
- Genus: Calumma
- Species: C. vatosoa

Binomial name
- Calumma vatosoa Andreone, Mattioli, Jesu, & Randrianirina, 2001
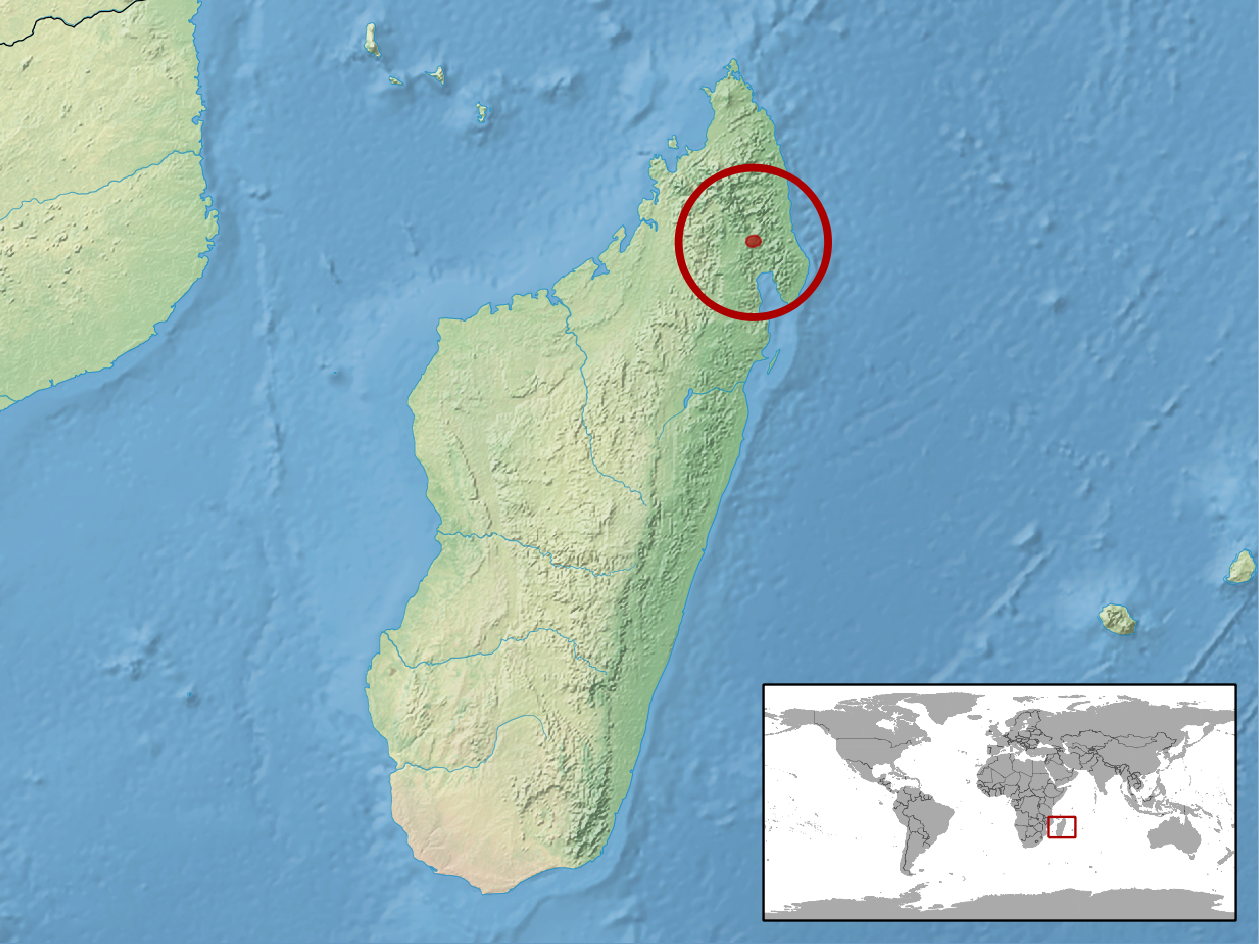

= Calumma vatosoa =

Species of lizard

Calumma vatosoa is a species of chameleon found in Madagascar.
