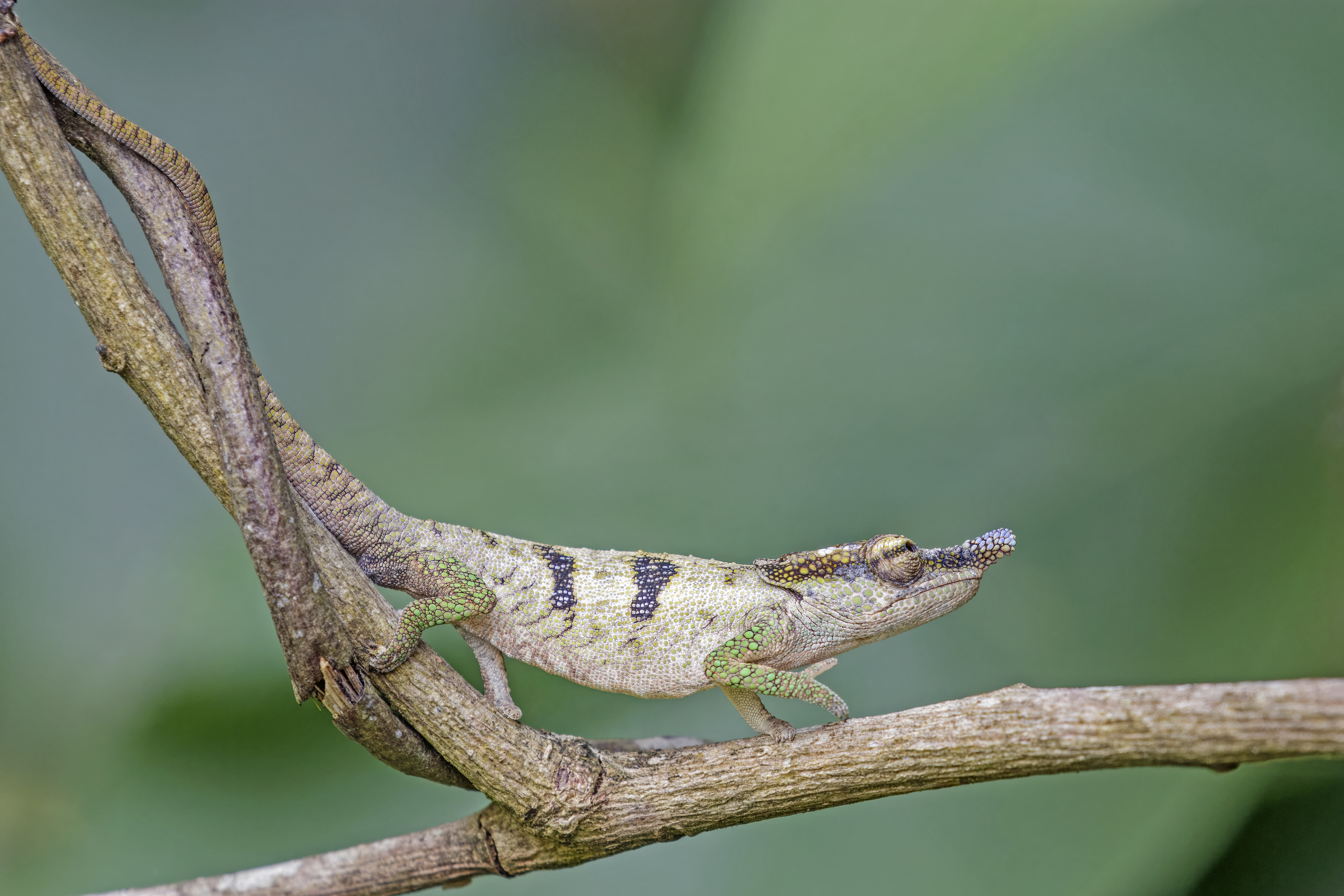
- male, Montagne d'Ambre

Conservation status
- Least Concern (IUCN 3.1)

Scientific classification
- Kingdom: Animalia
- Phylum: Chordata
- Class: Reptilia
- Order: Squamata
- Suborder: Iguania
- Family: Chamaeleonidae
- Genus: Calumma
- Species: C. linotum

Binomial name
- Calumma linotum (L. Müller, 1924)
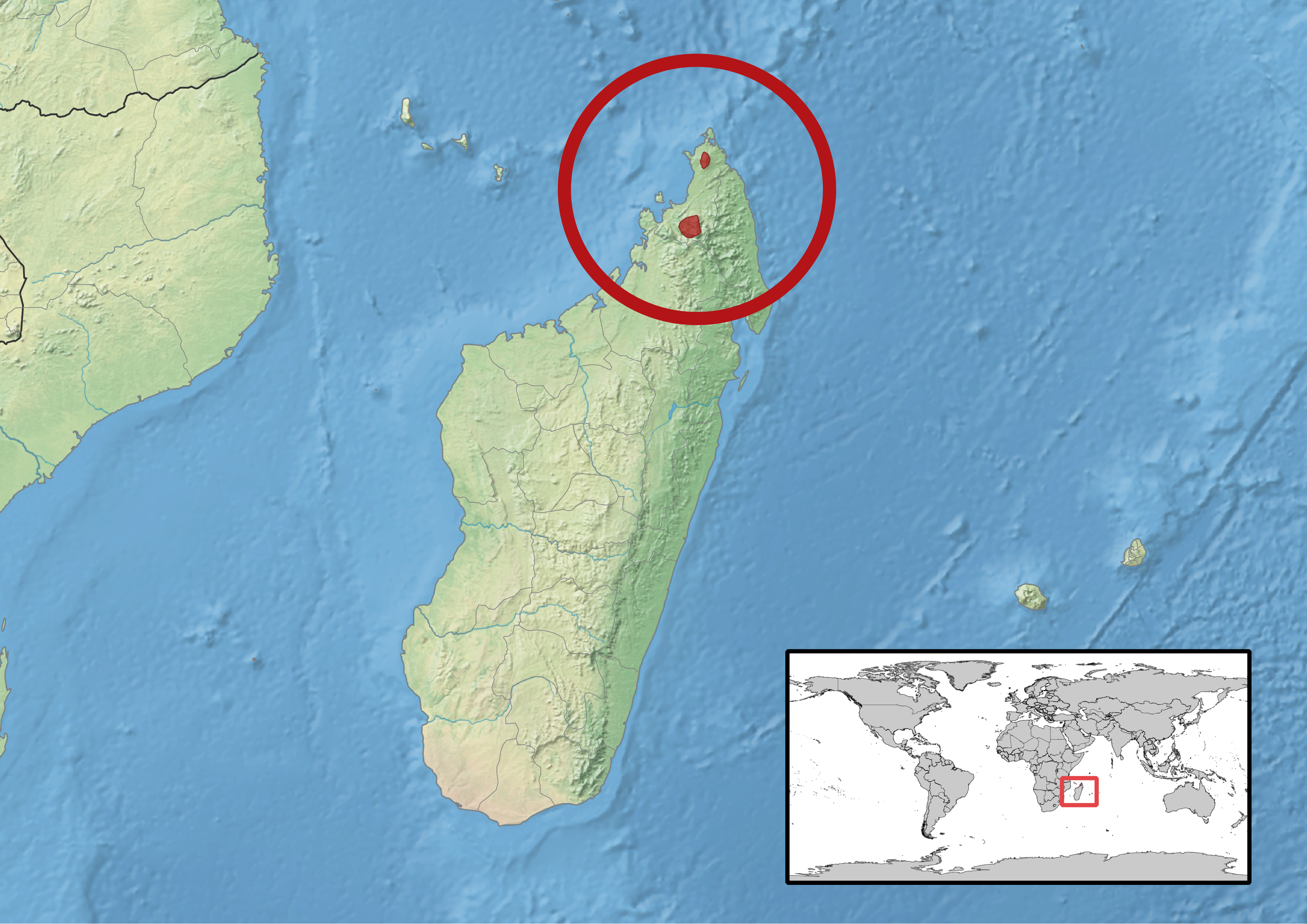

Synonyms
- Chamaeleon linotus

= Calumma linotum =

Species of lizard

Calumma linotum, commonly known as the blue-nosed chameleon, is a chameleon species endemic to northern Madagascar, and common in the forests of Nosy Be.

== Gallery ==
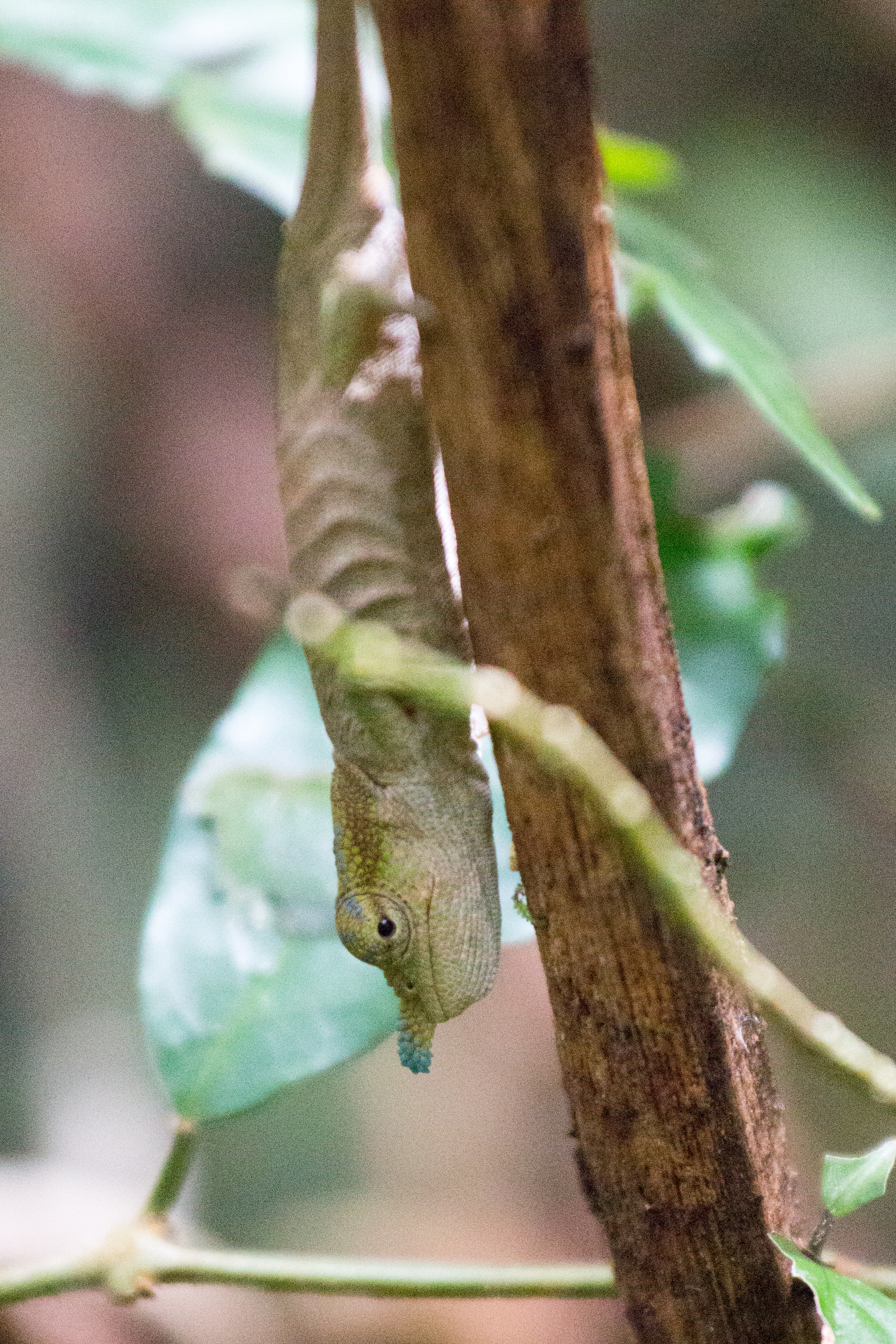
Montagne d'Ambre

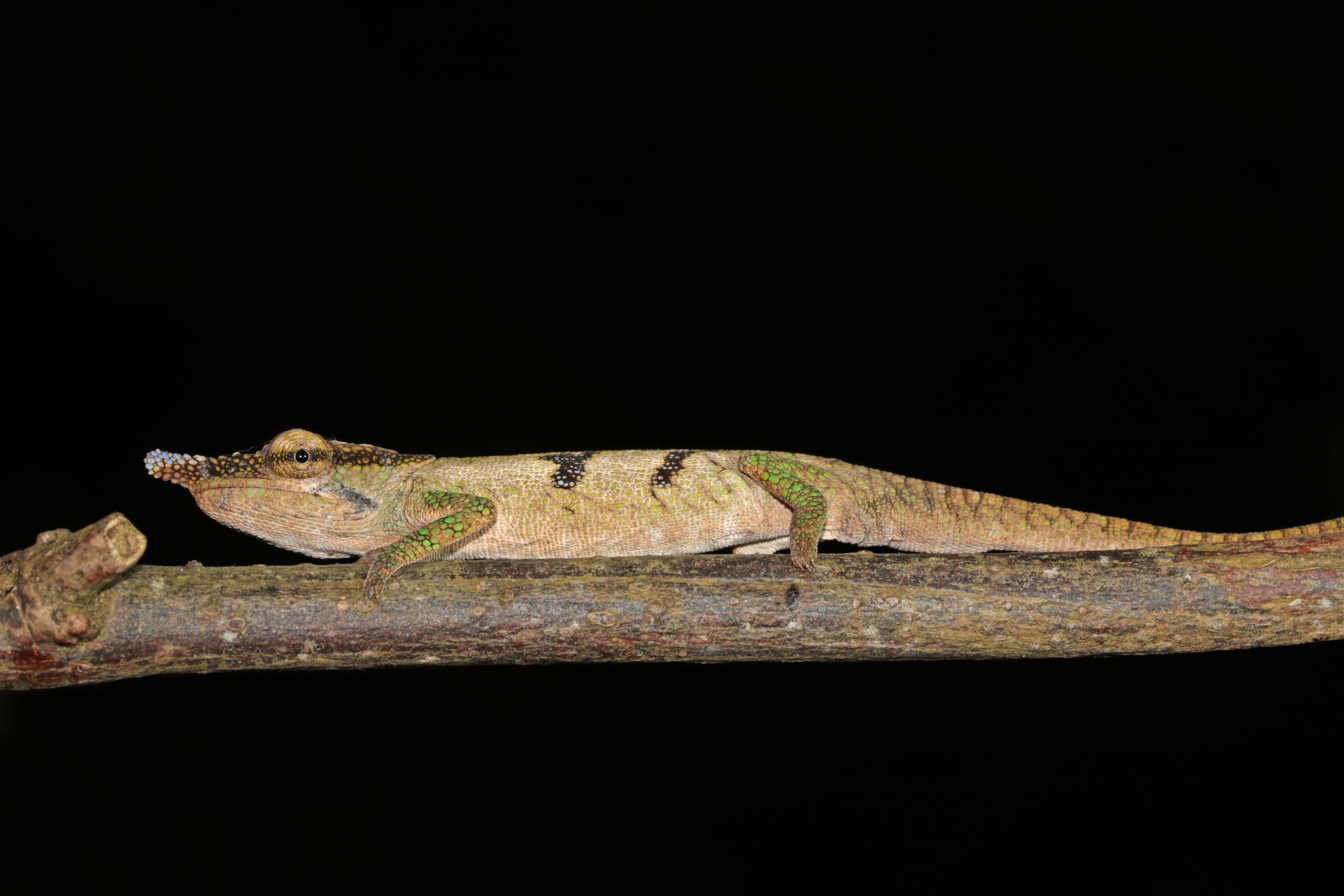
Male at Montagne d'Ambre
