= Calumma vohibola =

Conservation status
- Endangered (IUCN 3.1)

Scientific classification
- Kingdom: Animalia
- Phylum: Chordata
- Class: Reptilia
- Order: Squamata
- Suborder: Iguania
- Family: Chamaeleonidae
- Genus: Calumma
- Species: C. vohibola

Binomial name
- Calumma vohibola Gehring, Ratsoavina, Vences, & Glaw, 2011

Species of lizard

Calumma vohibola is a species of chameleon found in Madagascar.
