= Calumma lefona =

Scientific classification
- Kingdom: Animalia
- Phylum: Chordata
- Class: Reptilia
- Order: Squamata
- Suborder: Iguania
- Family: Chamaeleonidae
- Genus: Calumma
- Species: C. lefona

Binomial name
- Calumma lefona Prötzel, Vences, Hawlitschek, Scherz, Ratsoavina, & Glaw, 2018

Species of lizard

Calumma lefona is a species of chameleon found in Madagascar.
