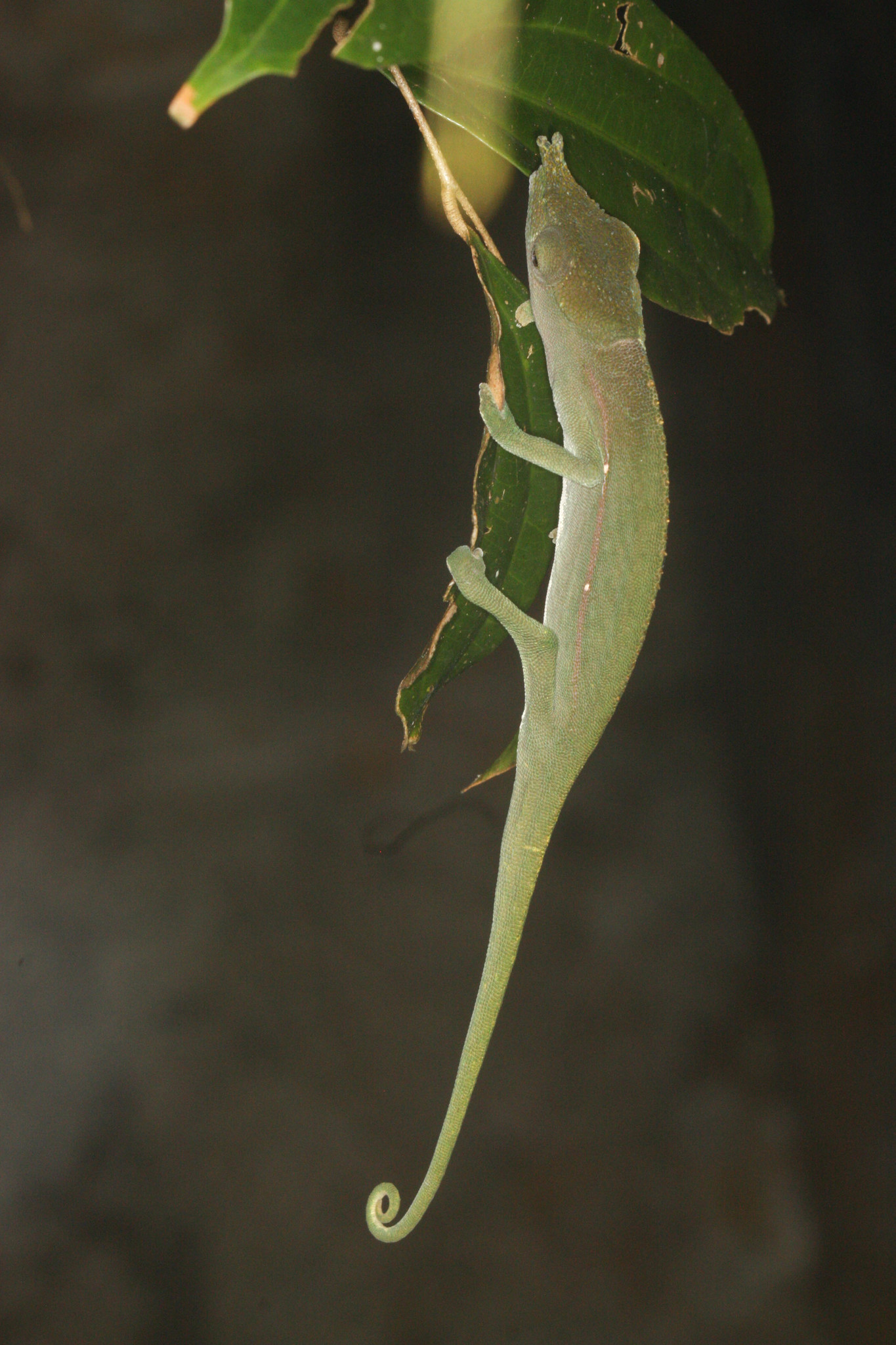

Conservation status
- Endangered (IUCN 3.1)

Scientific classification
- Kingdom: Animalia
- Phylum: Chordata
- Class: Reptilia
- Order: Squamata
- Suborder: Iguania
- Family: Chamaeleonidae
- Genus: Calumma
- Species: C. furcifer

Binomial name
- Calumma furcifer (Vaillant & Grandidier, 1880)
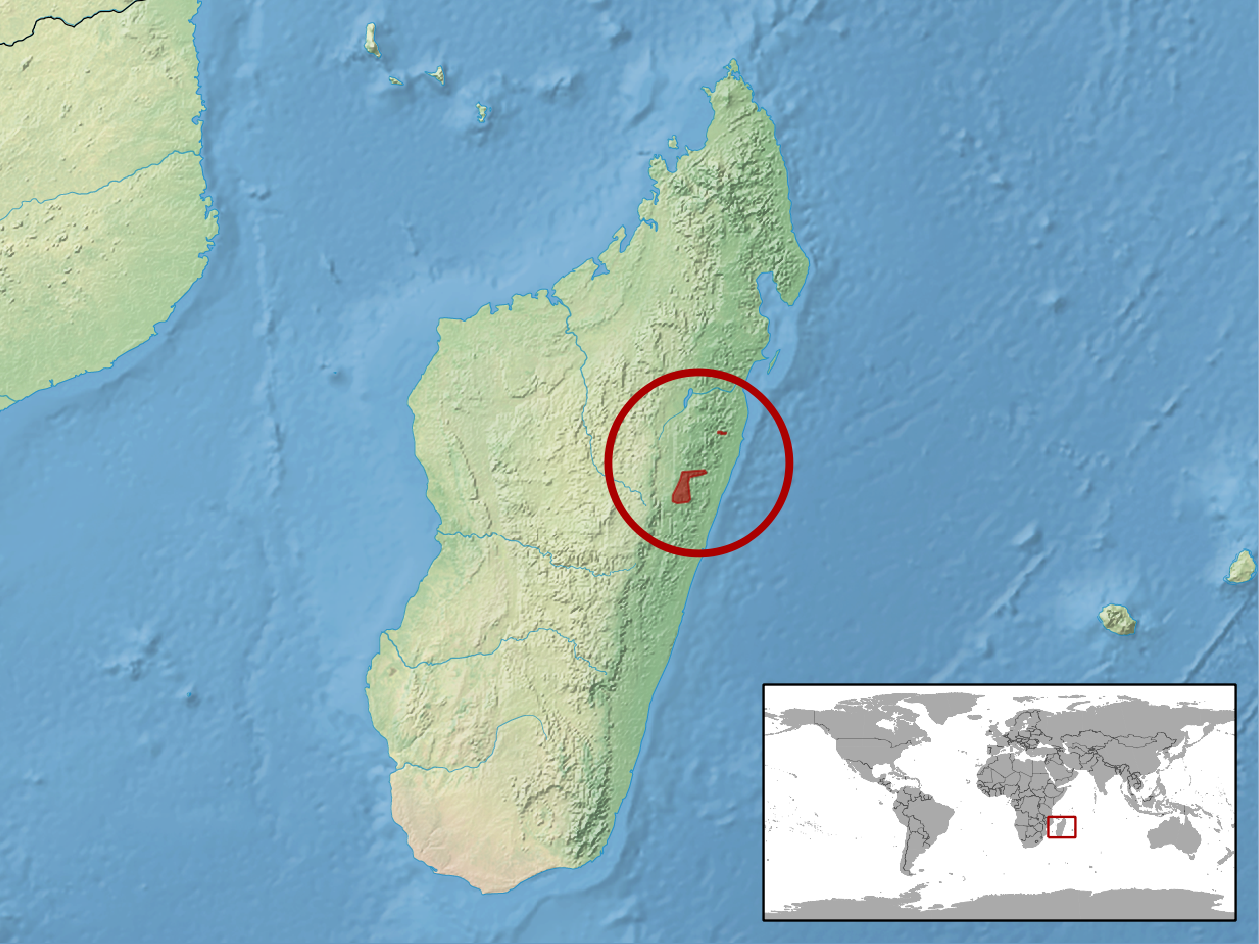

= Calumma furcifer =

Species of lizard

Calumma furcifer, the "fork-nosed" chameleon, is a species of chameleon found in Madagascar, in the western Indian Ocean.
