= Calumma emelinae =

Scientific classification
- Kingdom: Animalia
- Phylum: Chordata
- Class: Reptilia
- Order: Squamata
- Suborder: Iguania
- Family: Chamaeleonidae
- Genus: Calumma
- Species: C. emelinae

Binomial name
- Calumma emelinae Prötzel, Scherz, Ratsoavina, Vences, & Glaw, 2020

Species of chameleon

Calumma emelinae is a species of chameleon found in Madagascar.
