= Calumma gehringi =

Scientific classification
- Kingdom: Animalia
- Phylum: Chordata
- Class: Reptilia
- Order: Squamata
- Suborder: Iguania
- Family: Chamaeleonidae
- Genus: Calumma
- Species: C. gehringi

Binomial name
- Calumma gehringi Prötzel, Vences, Scherz, Vieites, & Glaw, 2017

Species of lizard

Calumma gehringi is a species of chameleon found in Madagascar.
