= Calumma ratnasariae =

Scientific classification
- Kingdom: Animalia
- Phylum: Chordata
- Class: Reptilia
- Order: Squamata
- Suborder: Iguania
- Family: Chamaeleonidae
- Genus: Calumma
- Species: C. ratnasariae

Binomial name
- Calumma ratnasariae Prötzel, Scherz, Ratsoavina, Vences, & Glaw, 2020

Species of lizard

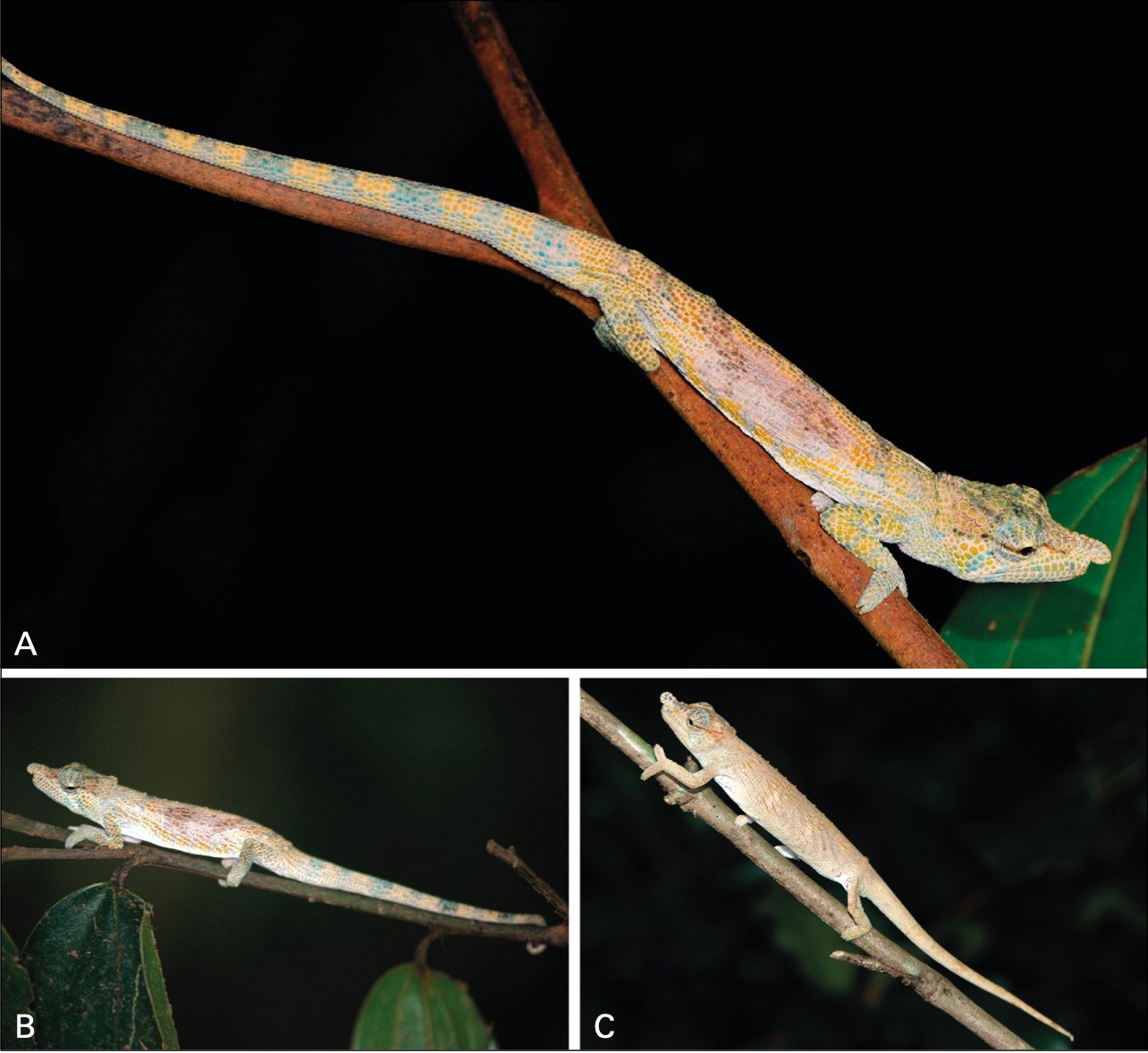
Calumma ratnasariae sp. nov. from Ampotsidy mountains. (A, B) Adult male holotype (ZSM 35/2016), slightly displaying, and (C) adult female (MSZC 0130, UADBA uncatalogued) in relaxed state. Named after Yulia Ratnasari

Calumma ratnasariae is a species of chameleon found in Madagascar. Calumma ratnasariae is a species of chameleon exclusively found within the Bealanana District situated in the northern region of Madagascar. Its habitat ranges from the Analabe Forest in the southern territory to Andrevorevo.

The specific epithet is named after Yulia Ratnasari, in recognition of her contribution for taxonomic research and nature conservation projects in Madagascar.
