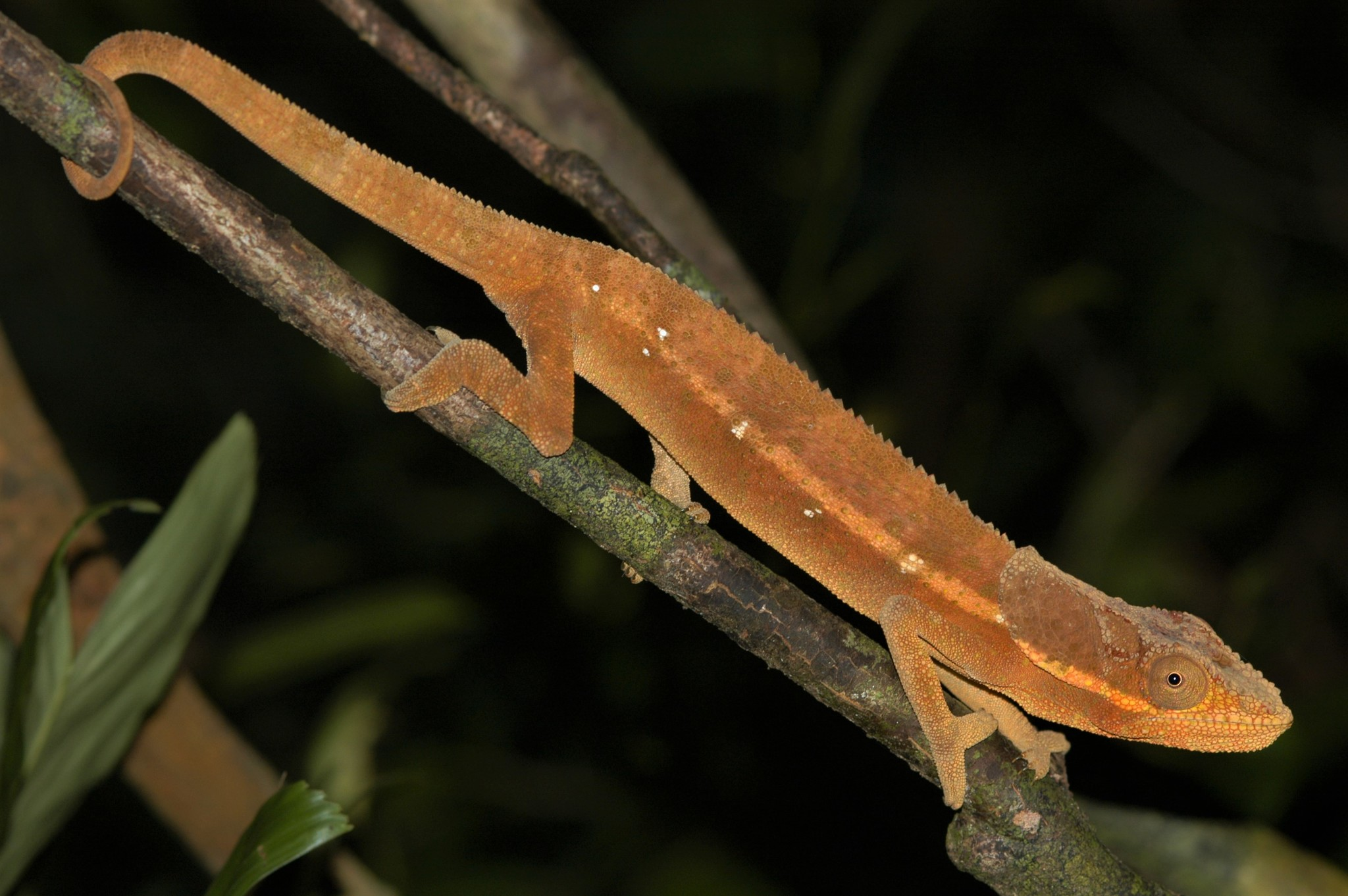

Conservation status
- Vulnerable (IUCN 3.1)

Scientific classification
- Kingdom: Animalia
- Phylum: Chordata
- Class: Reptilia
- Order: Squamata
- Suborder: Iguania
- Family: Chamaeleonidae
- Genus: Calumma
- Species: C. cucullatum

Binomial name
- Calumma cucullatum Gray, 1831
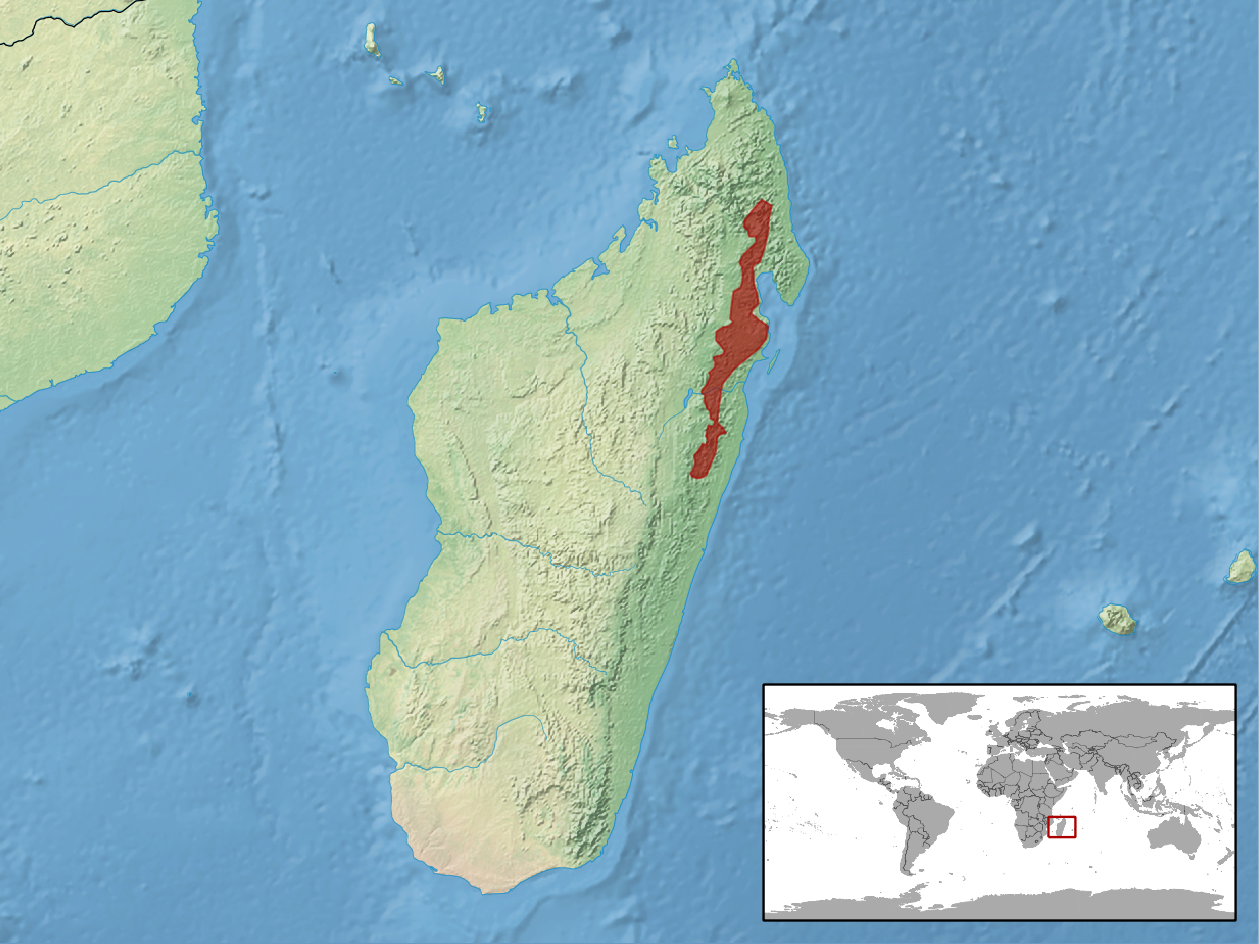

= Hooded chameleon =

Species of lizard

The hooded chameleon (Calumma cucullatum) is a Vulnerable species of chameleon endemic to north-east Madagascar; its geological type locality is Madagascar. It can be found in humid forests over an area of 17,432 km^{2} (6,731 sq mi) between 400 and 720 m (1,310 and 2,360 ft) above mean sea level.

== Distribution and habitat ==
Calumma cucullatum can be found in north-eastern Madagascar, and its geological type locality is Madagascar, where it is found in humid forests. The species was once found at Marojejy National Park, the most northern where it has been recorded, and Marolambo, the southernmost. The species can be found at low elevations between 400 and 720 m (1,310 and 2,360 ft). It has also been found in Tsararano, Anandrivola, and Masoala, and is found over an area of a total of 17,432 km^{2} (6,731 sq mi). The International Union for Conservation of Nature (IUCN) has classed C. cucullatum as s vulnerable species, as it is threatened by many factors such as the slash-and-burn method of agriculture.

== Taxonomy ==
The species was first described by Gray in 1831 as the Chamaeleon cucullatus. Duméril and Bibron described it in 1836: 227 as Chamaeleo cucullatus, and Gray described it as Bradypodium cucullatum in 1865: 351. The same year, Gray also described it as the Calumma cucullata. In 1911: 32, Werner described the species as Chamaeleon cucullatus. In 1986, Klaver and Böhme described it as Calumma cucullata, and the same for Glaw and Vences in 1994: 247 and Necas in 1999: 274. Lutzmann and Lutzmann described it as Calumma cucullatum in 2004.
