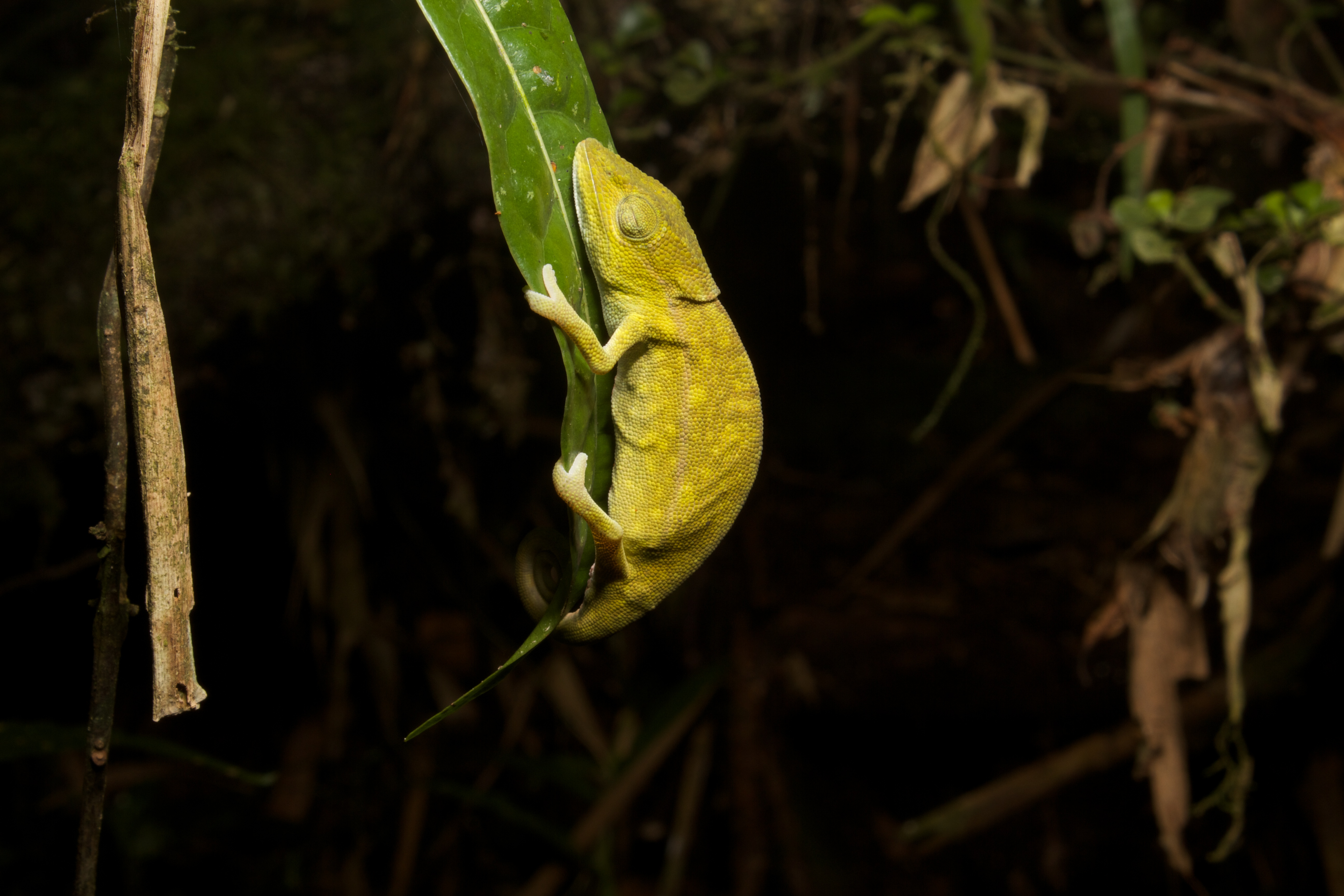

Conservation status
- Endangered (IUCN 3.1)

Scientific classification
- Kingdom: Animalia
- Phylum: Chordata
- Class: Reptilia
- Order: Squamata
- Suborder: Iguania
- Family: Chamaeleonidae
- Genus: Calumma
- Species: C. glawi

Binomial name
- Calumma glawi Böhme, 1997
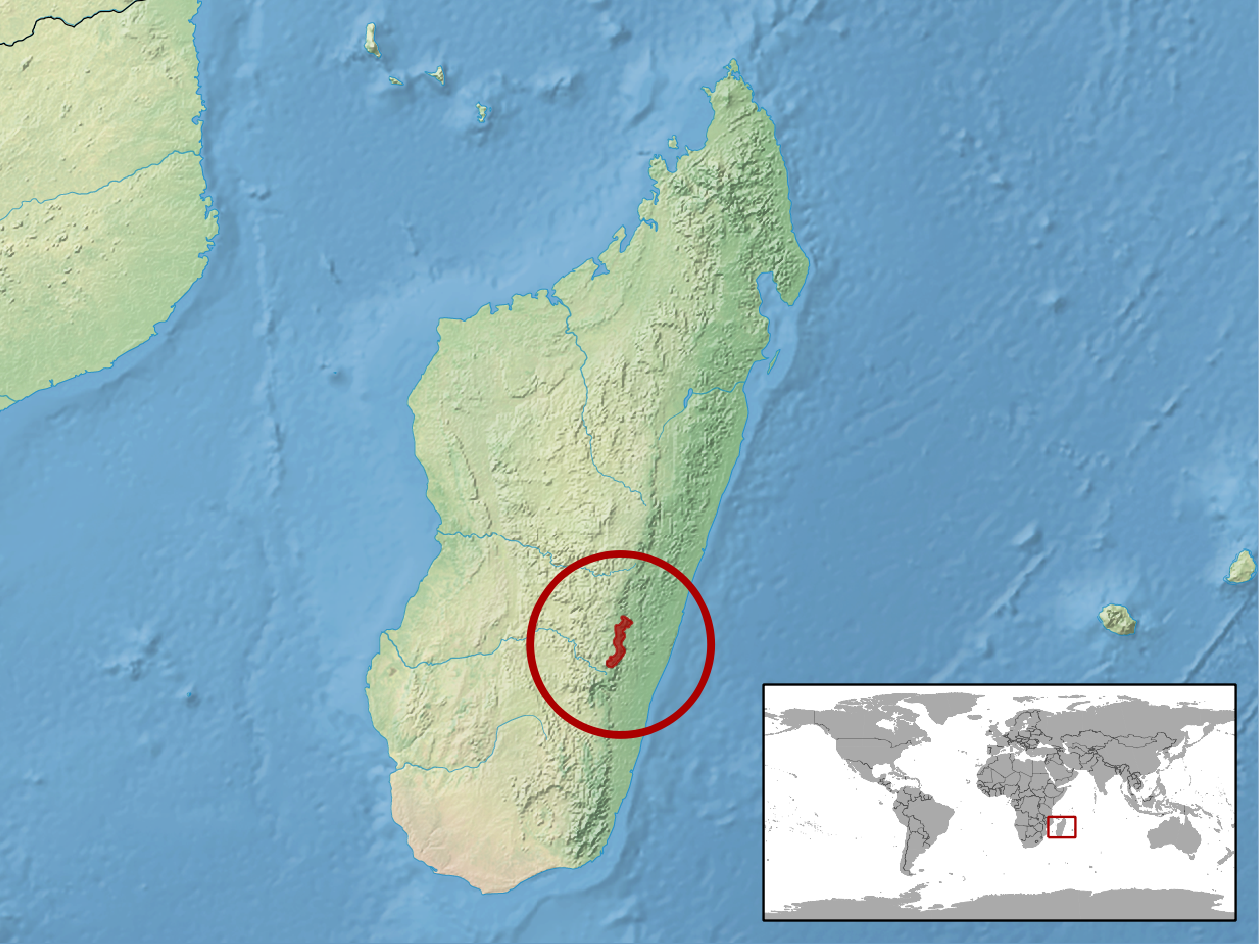

= Calumma glawi =

Species of lizard

Calumma glawi is a species of chameleon, a lizard in the family Chamaeleonidae. The species is endemic to Madagascar.

== Etymology ==
The specific name, glawi, is in honor of German Herpetologist Frank Glaw.

== Habitat ==
The preferred natural habitat of C. glawi is forest, at altitudes of 1,030–1,200 m (3,380–3,940 ft).

== Reproduction ==
C. glawi is oviparous.
