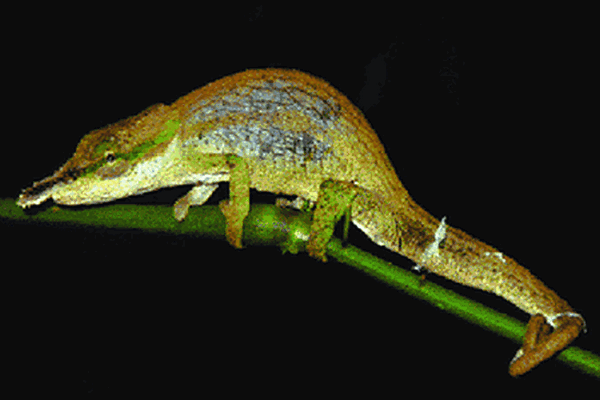

Conservation status
- Near Threatened (IUCN 3.1)

Scientific classification
- Kingdom: Animalia
- Phylum: Chordata
- Class: Reptilia
- Order: Squamata
- Suborder: Iguania
- Family: Chamaeleonidae
- Genus: Calumma
- Species: C. guibei

Binomial name
- Calumma guibei (Hillenius, 1959)
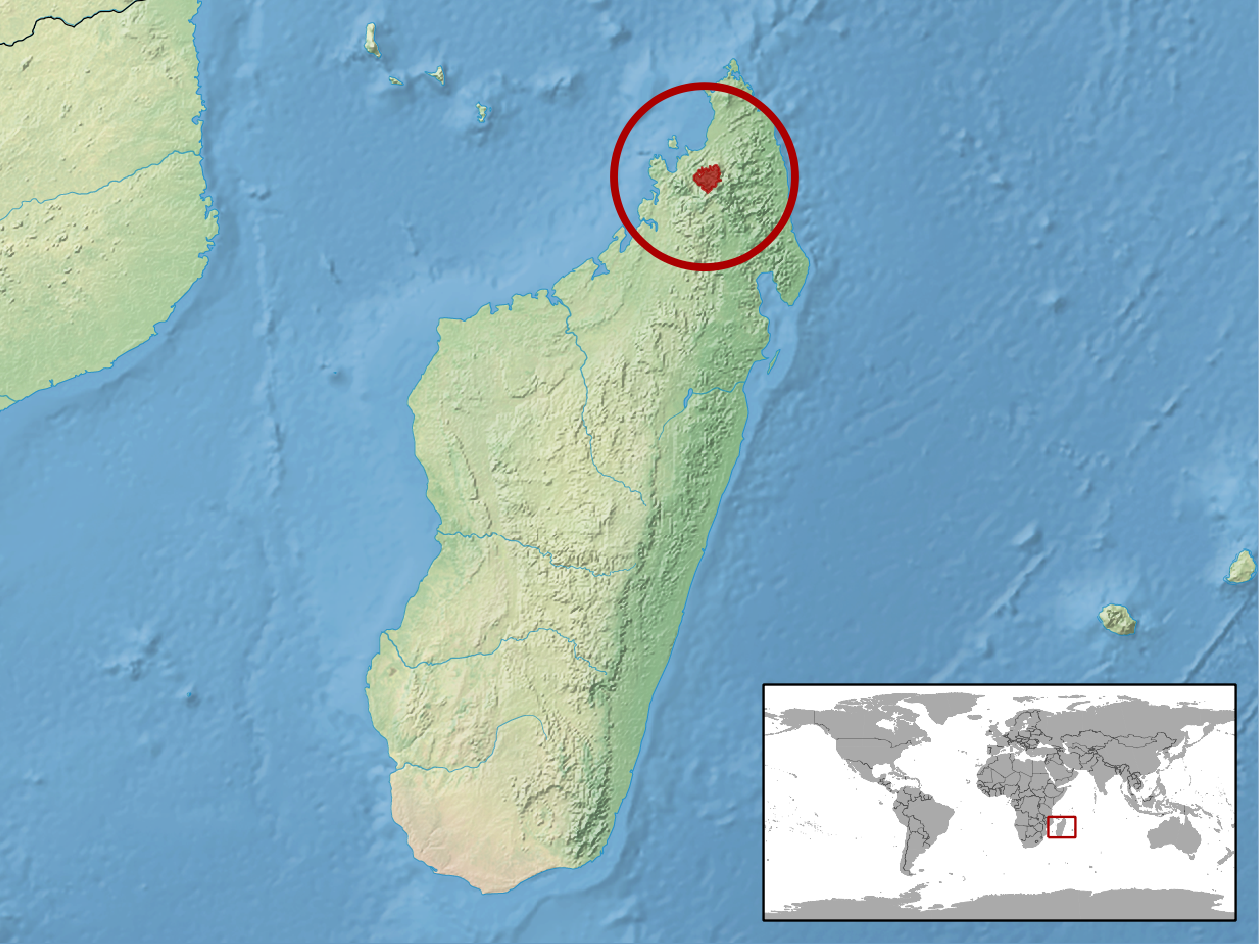

Synonyms
- Chamaeleo guibei Hillenius, 1959; Calumma guibei — Klaver & Böhme, 1986

= Calumma guibei =

Species of lizard

Calumma guibei, also known commonly as Guibé's chameleon, is a species of chameleon, a lizard in the family Chamaeleonidae. The species is endemic to Madagascar.

== Etymology ==
The specific name, guibei, is in honor of French herpetologist Jean Guibé.

== Geographic range ==
C. guibei is found in northern Madagascar. The type locality is Mt. Tsaratanana, elevation 1,800 m (5,900 ft).

== Habitat ==
The preferred natural habitat of C. guibei is forest, at elevations of 1,000–2,250 m (3,280–7,380 ft).

== Description ==
C. guibei has an average snout-to-vent length (SVL) of about 5 cm (2.0 in). It has a soft dermal rostral appendage, which is longer in males than in females.

== Reproduction ==
C. guibei is oviparous.
