= Calumma radamanus =

Scientific classification
- Domain: Eukaryota
- Kingdom: Animalia
- Phylum: Chordata
- Class: Reptilia
- Order: Squamata
- Suborder: Iguania
- Family: Chamaeleonidae
- Genus: Calumma
- Species: C. radamanus

Binomial name
- Calumma radamanus (Mertens, 1933)

Species of lizard

Calumma radamanus is a species of chameleon found in Madagascar.
