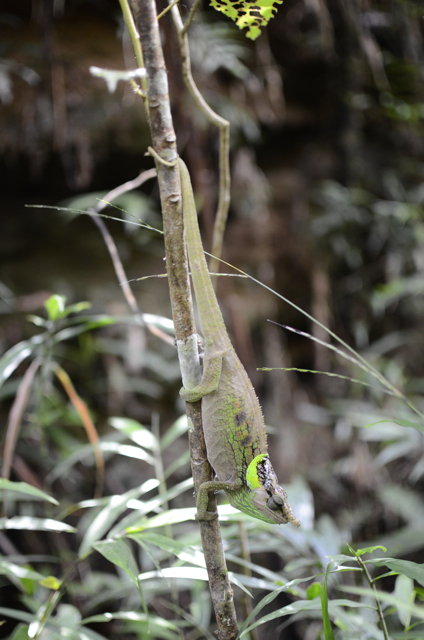

Conservation status
- Least Concern (IUCN 3.1)

Scientific classification
- Kingdom: Animalia
- Phylum: Chordata
- Class: Reptilia
- Order: Squamata
- Suborder: Iguania
- Family: Chamaeleonidae
- Genus: Calumma
- Species: C. malthe

Binomial name
- Calumma malthe (Günther, 1879)
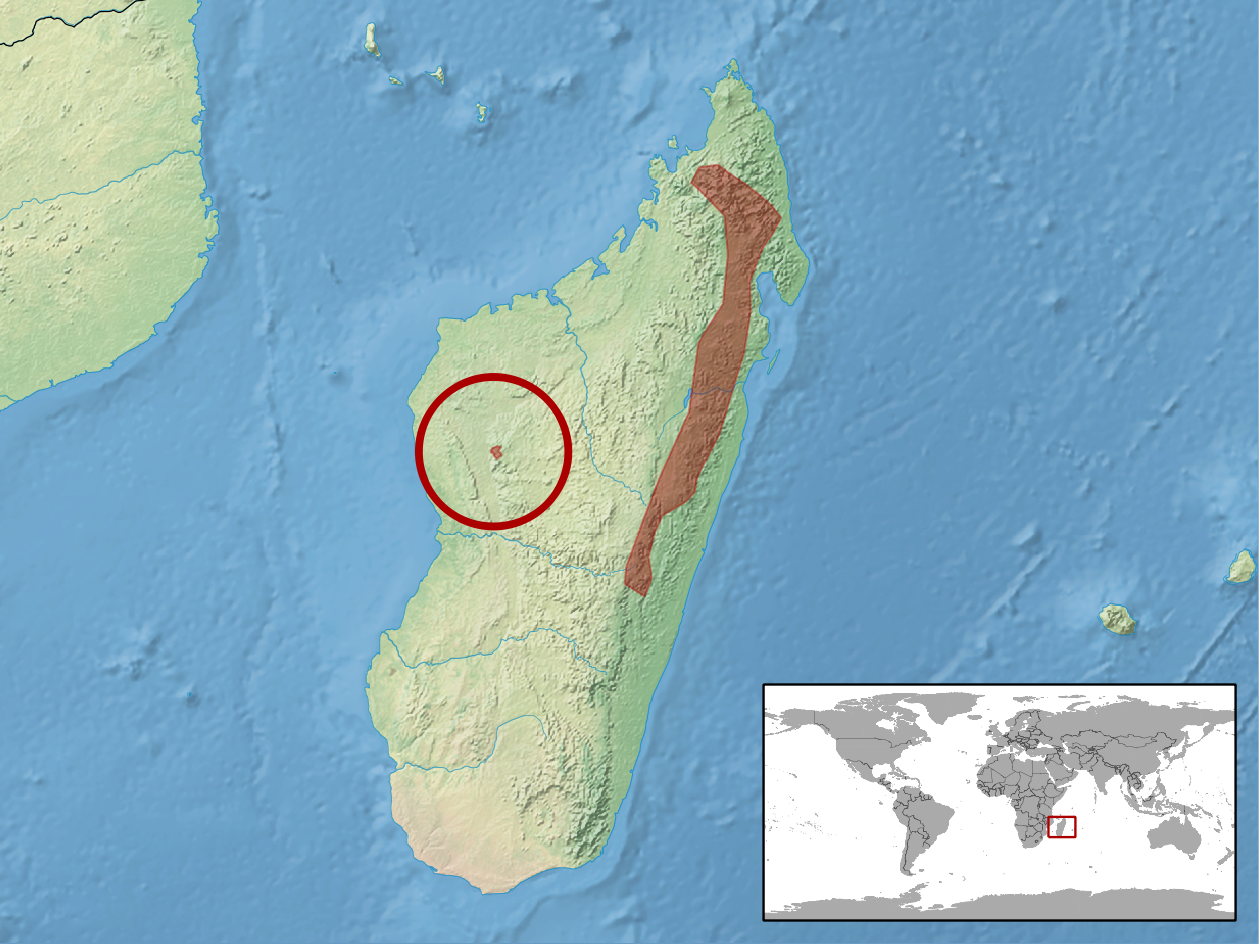

= Calumma malthe =

Species of lizard

Calumma malthe, common name Malthe's green-eared chameleon, is a species of chameleon found in Madagascar.

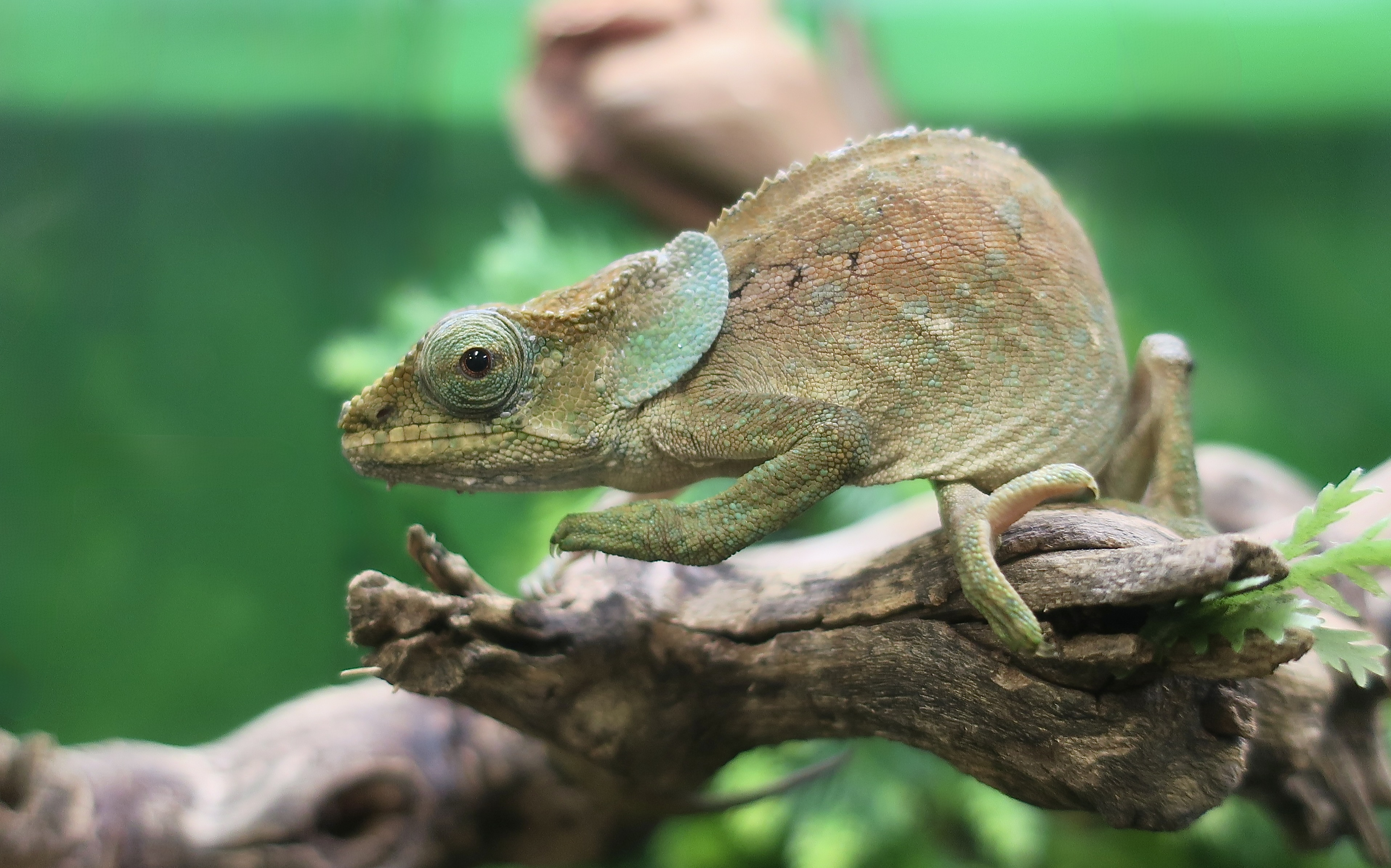
A female at LLL Reptiles, a reptile store in Henderson, Nevada.

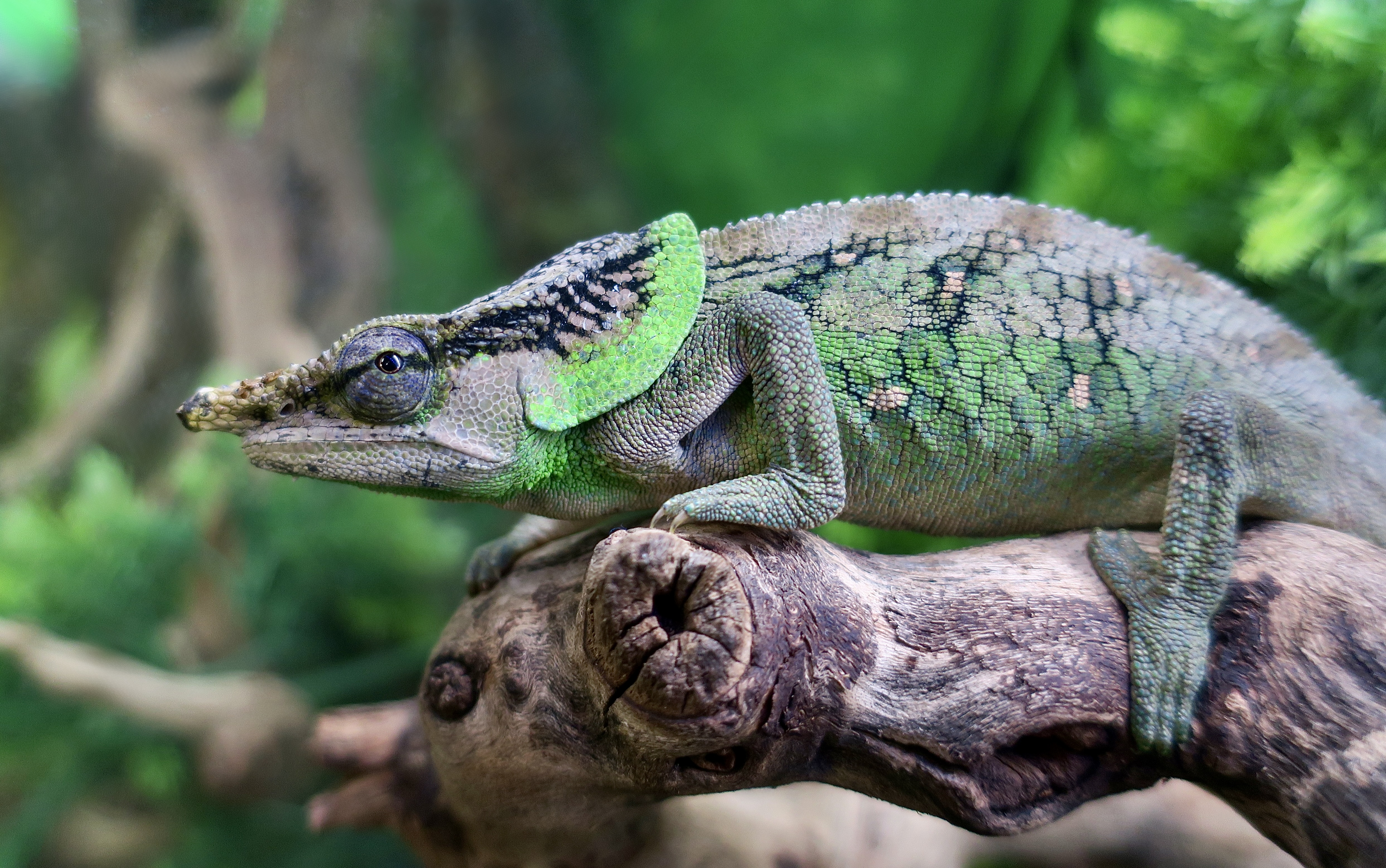
A male at LLL Reptiles, a reptile store in Henderson, Nevada.
