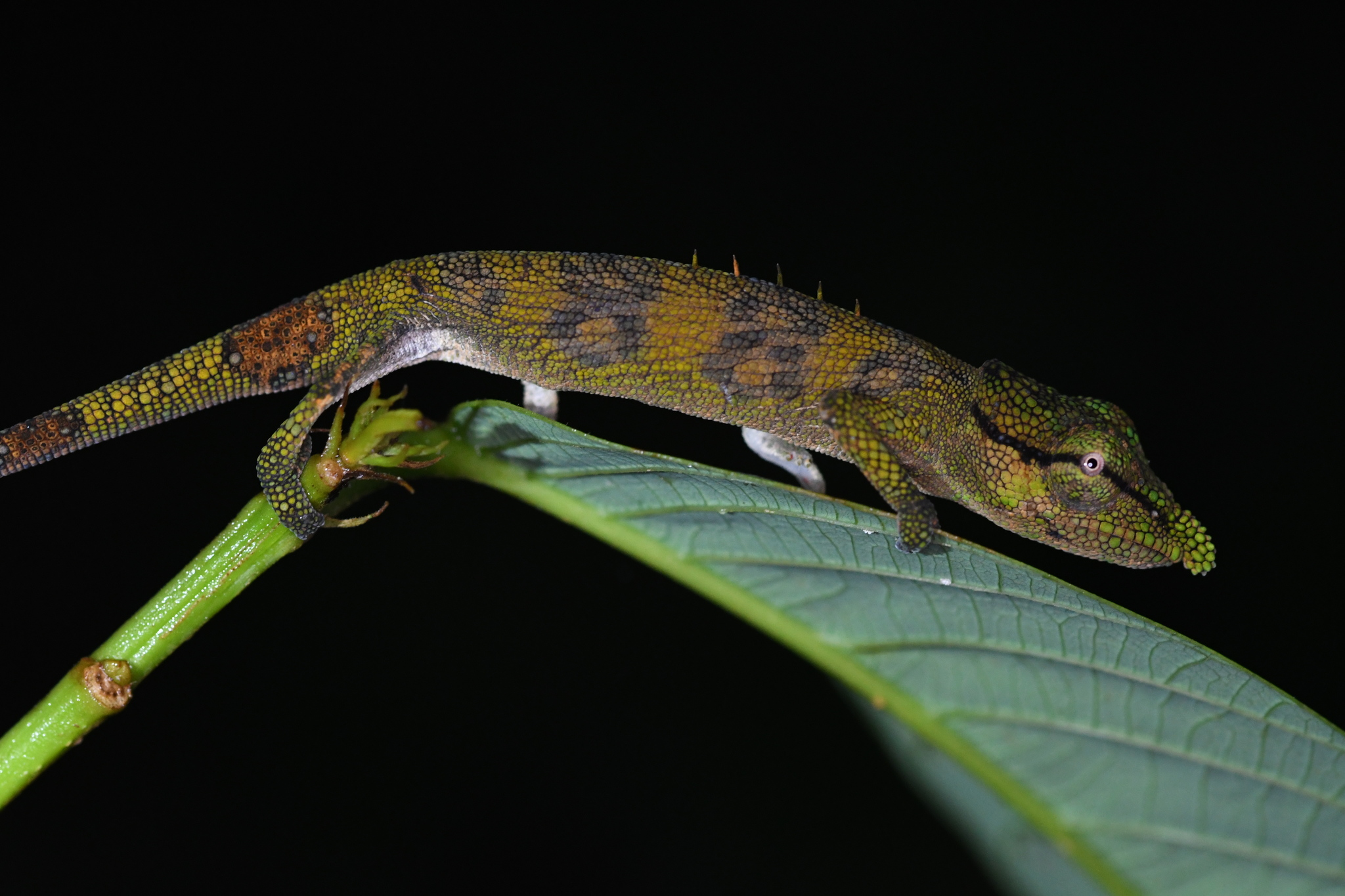

Scientific classification
- Kingdom: Animalia
- Phylum: Chordata
- Class: Reptilia
- Order: Squamata
- Suborder: Iguania
- Family: Chamaeleonidae
- Genus: Calumma
- Species: C. tjiasmantoi

Binomial name
- Calumma tjiasmantoi Prötzel, Scherz, Ratsoavina, Vences, & Glaw, 2020

= Calumma tjiasmantoi =

Species of lizard

Calumma tjiasmantoi is a species of chameleon found in Madagascar.
