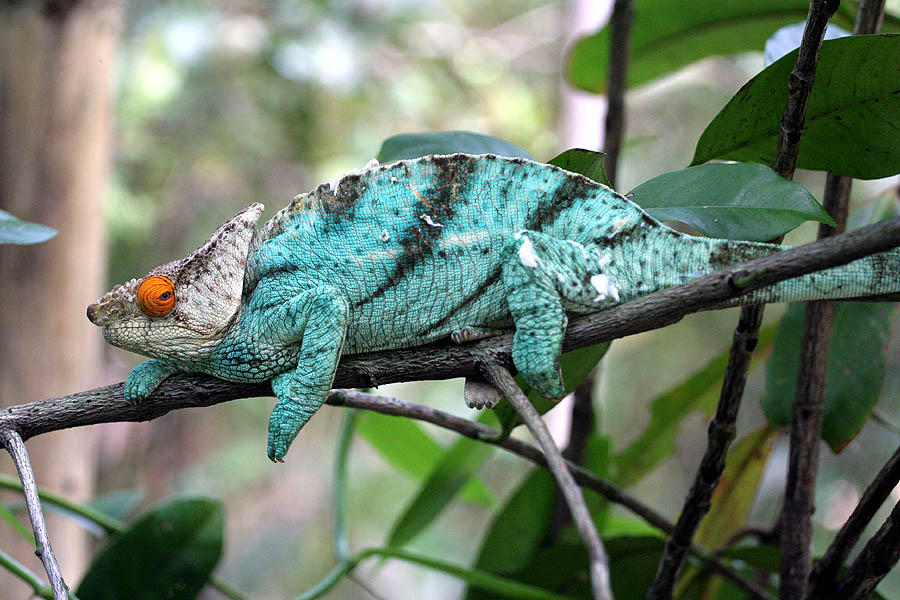
- Calumma parsonii

Scientific classification
- Kingdom: Animalia
- Phylum: Chordata
- Order: Squamata
- Suborder: Iguania
- Family: Chamaeleonidae
- Subfamily: Chamaeleoninae
- Genus: Calumma; Gray, 1865

Type species
- Chamaeleon cucullatus Gray, 1831

Diversity
- 41 species

= Calumma =

Calumma Temporal range: 17.9–0 Ma

Genus of lizards

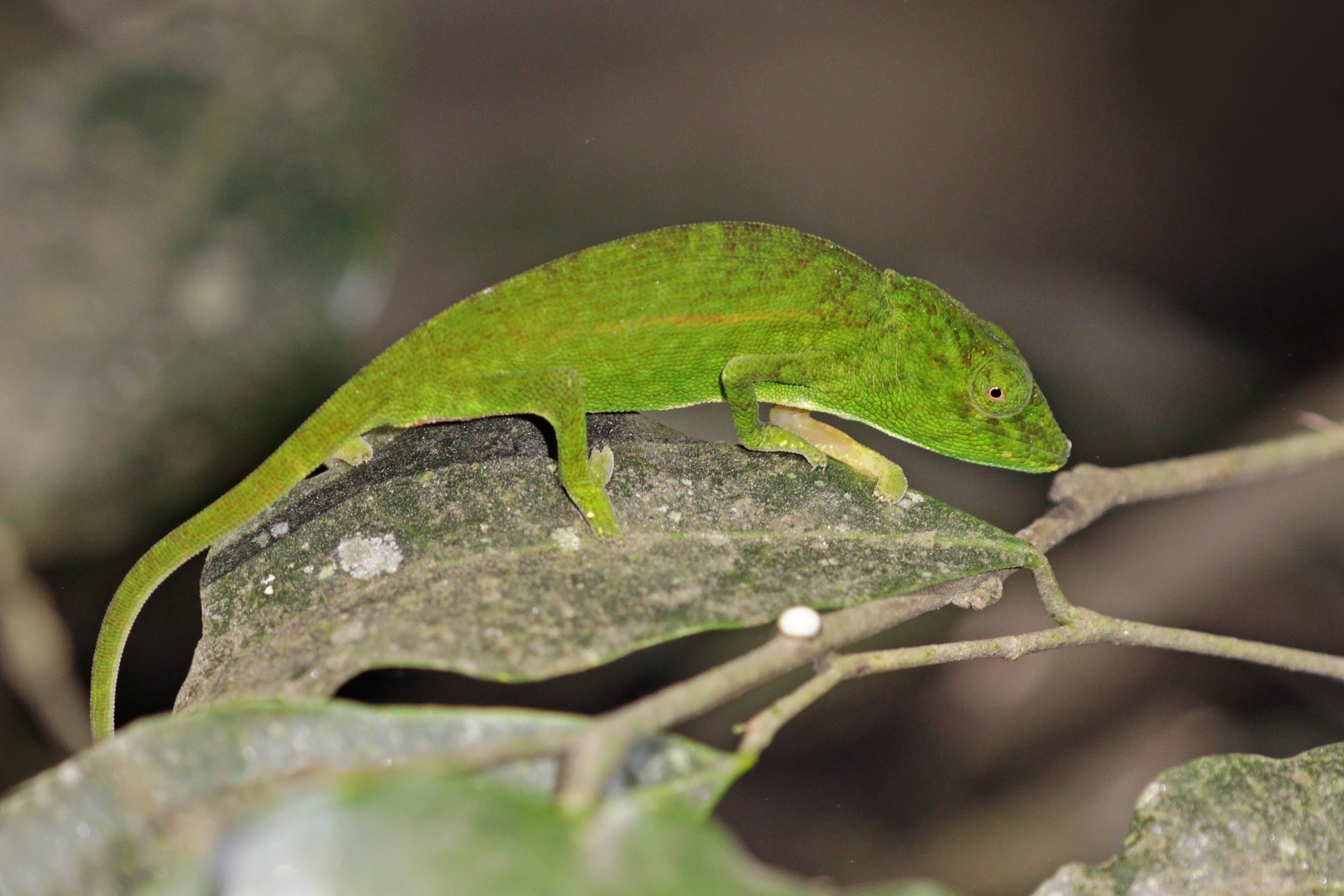
Glaw's chameleon (Calumma glawi)

Calumma is a genus of chameleons, highly adapted and specialised lizards, in the family Chamaeleonidae. The genus is endemic to the island of Madagascar. One species, formerly known as Calumma tigris (the Seychelles tiger chameleon), was transferred to the genus Archaius in 2010, upon the discovery of its closer relation to Rieppeleon – one of several genera referred to collectively as "leaf" or "pygmy" chameleons – rather than to Calumma. The earliest known fossil of the genus is of Calumma benovskyi, from early Miocene Kenya, showing that the genus likely originated on mainland East Africa. The genus includes one of the heaviest and longest chameleon species, the Parson's chameleon (Calumma parsonii). A number of Calumma species are known as Pinocchio chameleons due to their long noses, which often grow and shrink in length.

== Species groups ==
Four species groups are recognised within the genus Calumma (originally proposed by Glaw & Vences in 1994), some of which may be only phenetic, while others are phylogenetically supported:

=== Calumma furcifer species group ===
Contents: Calumma furcifer, C. gastrotaenia, C. marojezense, C. guillaumeti, C. andringitraense, C. glawi, C. vencesi

Species characterised by typically green body colouration, sleek body form, and generally no occipital lobes (flaps of skin posterior to the head; present only in C. glawi) and no rostral appendage (present only in males of C. furcifer).

=== Calumma cucullatum species group ===
Contents: Calumma cucullatum, C. crypticum, C. amber, C. tsaratananense, C. hafahafa, C. hilleniusi, C. peltierorum, C. malthe, C. brevicorne, C. jejy, C. tsycorne

Species characterised by distinct occipital lobes and generally a single bony rostral appendage that is larger in males than females.

=== Calumma nasutum species group ===
Contents: Calumma nasutum, C. fallax, C. gallus, C. guibei, C. boettgeri, C. linotum, C. gehringi, C. uetzi, C. lefona, C. juliae, C. vatosoa, C. vohibola, C. peyrierasi, C. roaloko

Species characterised by a soft dermal rostral appendage (generally present in males and absent in females). The following members possess occipital lobes: C. guibei, C. boettgeri, C. linotum, C. gehringi, C. uetzi, C. lefona, C. roaloko, and C. juliae. These taxa are collectively referred to as the C. guibei species complex. Occipital lobes are absent from all other species. The assignment of C. peyrierasi to this group remains a subject of uncertainty.

=== Calumma parsonii species group ===
Contents: Calumma globifer, C. ambreense, C. oshaughnessyi, C. parsonii, C. capuroni

Species characterised by large body size, males with paired rostral appendages, and some species with small occipital lobes.

== Species ==
The following 41 species are recognized as being valid as of October 2020:

- Calumma amber Raxworthy & Nussbaum, 2006 – Amber Mountain chameleon
- Calumma ambreense (Ramanantsoa, 1974)
- Calumma andringitraense (Brygoo, C. Blanc & Domergue, 1972)
- Calumma boettgeri (Boulenger, 1888) – Boettger's chameleon
- Calumma brevicorne (Günther, 1879) – short-horned chameleon
- Calumma capuroni (Brygoo, C. Blanc & Domergue, 1972) – Madagascar chameleon
- Calumma crypticum Raxworthy & Nussbaum, 2006 – blue-legged chameleon
- Calumma cucullatum (Gray, 1831) – hooded chameleon
- Calumma emelinae Prötzel, Scherz, Ratsoavina, Vences & Glaw, 2020
- Calumma fallax (Mocquard, 1900) – deceptive chameleon
- Calumma furcifer (Vaillant & Grandidier, 1880) – forked chameleon
- Calumma gallus (Günther, 1877) – blade chameleon
- Calumma gastrotaenia (Boulenger, 1888) – Perinet chameleon
- Calumma gehringi Prötzel, Vences, Scherz, Vieites & Glaw, 2017
- Calumma glawi Böhme, 1997 – Glaw's chameleon
- Calumma globifer (Günther, 1879) – globe-horned chameleon or flat-casqued chameleon
- Calumma guibei (Hillenius, 1959) – Guibe's chameleon
- Calumma guillaumeti (Brygoo, C. Blanc & Domergue, 1974)
- Calumma hafahafa Raxworthy & Nussbaum, 2006 – bizarre-nosed chameleon
- Calumma hilleniusi (Brygoo, C. Blanc & Domergue, 1973)
- Calumma jejy Raxworthy & Nussbaum, 2006 – Marojejy Peak chameleon
- Calumma juliae Prötzel, Vences, Hawlitschek, Scherz, Ratsoavina & Glaw, 2018
- Calumma lefona Prötzel, Vences, Hawlitschek, Scherz, Ratsoavina & Glaw, 2018
- Calumma linotum (L. Müller, 1924) – Amber Mountain blue-nosed chameleon
- Calumma malthe (Günther, 1879) – yellow-green chameleon
- Calumma marojezense (Brygoo, C. Blanc & Domergue, 1970)
- Calumma nasutum (A.M.C. Duméril & Bibron, 1836) – big-nosed chameleon, pimple-nose chameleon
- Calumma oshaughnessyi (Günther, 1881) – O'Shaughnessy's chameleon
- Calumma parsonii (Cuvier, 1824) – Parsons's chameleon
- Calumma peltierorum Raxworthy & Nussbaum, 2006 – Peltier's chameleon
- Calumma peyrierasi (Brygoo, C. Blanc & Domergue, 1974) – Brygoo's chameleon, Peyriéras's chameleon
- Calumma radamanus (Mertens, 1933)
- Calumma ratnasariae Prötzel, Scherz, Ratsoavina, Vences & Glaw, 2020
- Calumma roaloko Prötzel, Lambert, Andrianasolo, Hutter, Cobb, Scherz & Glaw, 2018 – Two-toned soft-nosed chameleon
- Calumma tarzan Gehring, Pabijan, Ratsoavina, J. Köhler, Vences & Glaw, 2010 – Tarzan chameleon, Tarzan's chameleon
- Calumma tjiasmantoi Prötzel, Scherz, Ratsoavina, Vences & Glaw, 2020
- Calumma tsaratananense (Brygoo & Domergue, 1967) – Tsaratanana chameleon
- Calumma tsycorne Raxworthy & Nussbaum, 2006 – blunt-nosed chameleon
- Calumma uetzi Prötzel, Vences, Hawlitschek, Scherz, Ratsoavina & Glaw, 2018 – Uetz's soft-nosed chameleon
- Calumma vatosoa Andreone, Mattioli, Jesu & Randrianirina, 2001
- Calumma vencesi Andreone, Mattioli, Jesu & Randrianirina, 2001 – Vences's chameleon
- Calumma vohibola Gehring, Ratsoavina, Vences & Glaw, 2011

Nota bene: A binomial authority in parentheses indicates that the species was originally described in a genus other than Calumma.
