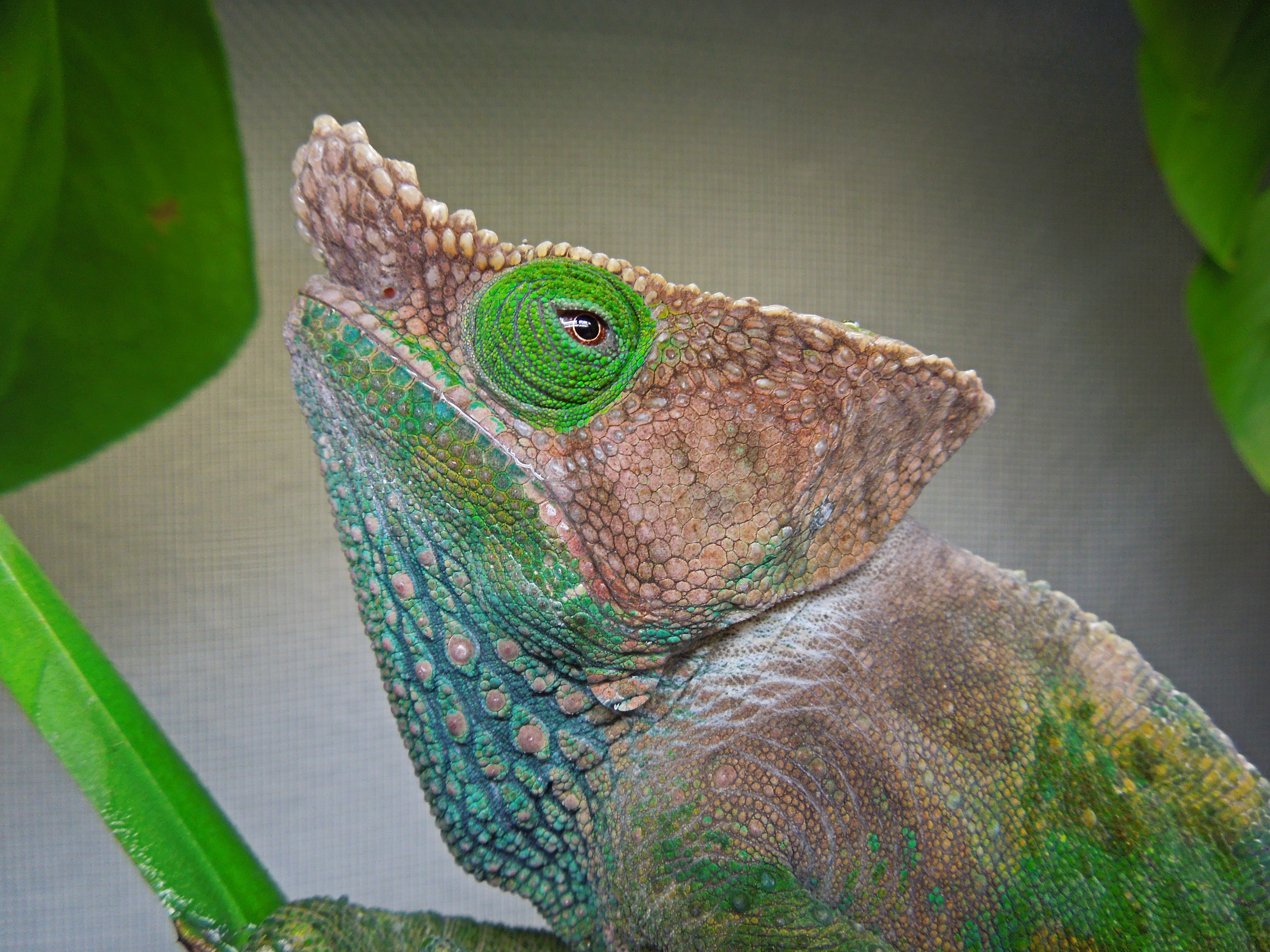
- Calumma oshaughnessyi

Conservation status
- Vulnerable (IUCN 3.1)

Scientific classification
- Kingdom: Animalia
- Phylum: Chordata
- Class: Reptilia
- Order: Squamata
- Suborder: Iguania
- Family: Chamaeleonidae
- Genus: Calumma
- Species: C. oshaughnessyi

Binomial name
- Calumma oshaughnessyi (Günther, 1881)
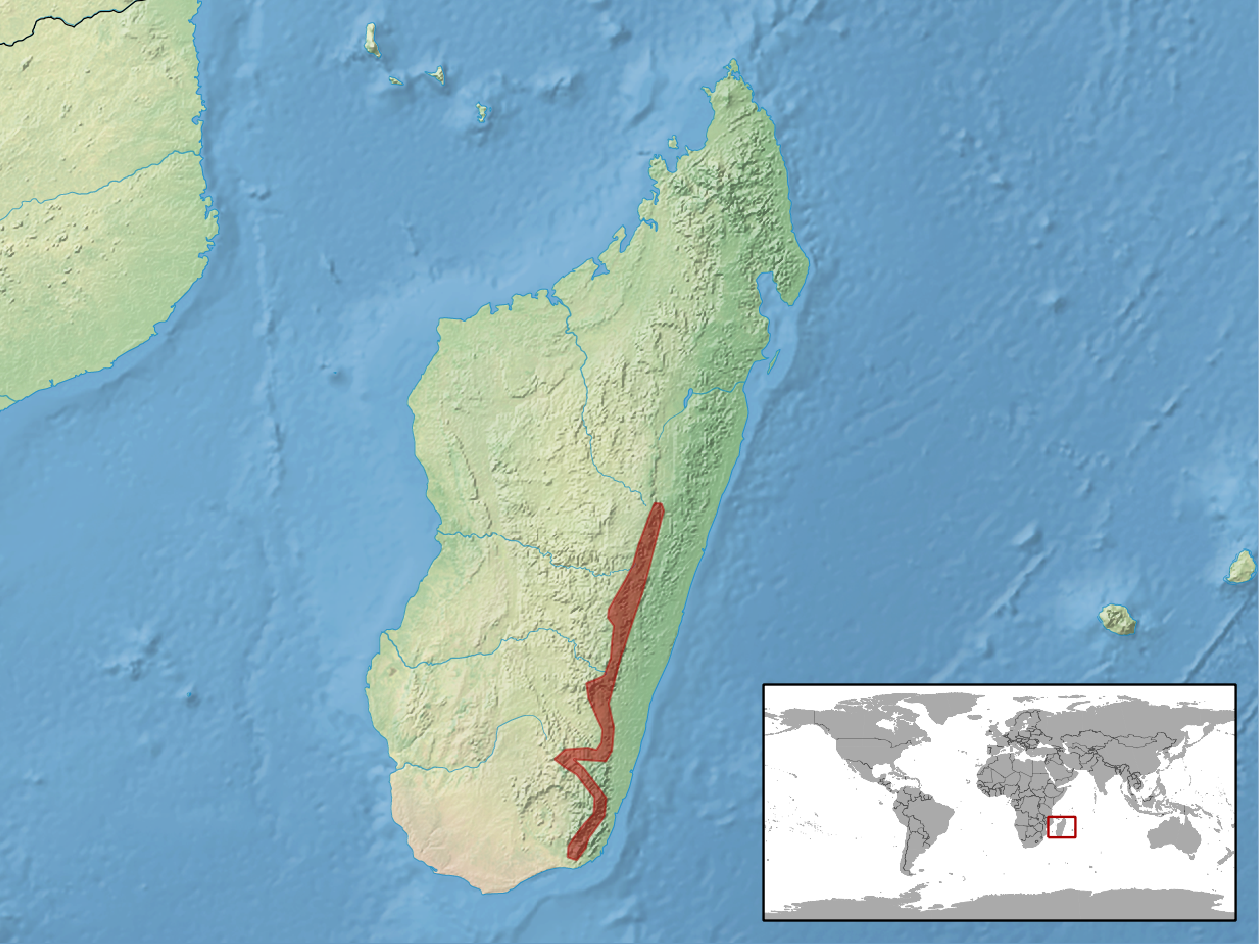
- Geographic range of O'Shaughnessy's chameleon

Synonyms
- Chamaeleon o'shaughnessii Günther, 1881; Chamaeleo oshaughnessyi — Mertens, 1964; Calumma oshaughnessyi — Klaver & Böhme, 1986

= O'Shaughnessy's chameleon =

Species of lizard

O'Shaughnessy's chameleon (Calumma oshaughnessyi) is a species of chameleon, a lizard in the family Chamaeleonidae. The species is endemic to Madagascar. It was named after the British poet and herpetologist Arthur O'Shaughnessy.

== Distribution and habitat ==
O'Shaughnessy's chameleon has a geographic range of about 18,000 square kilometers (6,950 square miles) throughout the southeastern portion of the central highlands of Madagascar. Its distribution extends from Tsinjoarivo, Ambatolampy in the north to Andohahela National Park in the south. The species is highly dependent on intact, humid forest at elevations of 1,240–1,300 m (4,070–4,270 ft) as its natural habitat, living in lower densities on selectively logged territories.

== Description ==
O'Shaughnessy's chameleon, being closely related to Parson's chameleon, is similar in shape and color but slightly smaller. Albert Günther, the first to scientifically describe the species, stated that the type specimen is a male measuring 15.5 inches (39.4 cm) in total length, including its tail which is 9 inches (22.9 cm) long. It is mostly brownish gray, with a darker throat and jaw. Although lacking horns, the male of the species has a short, bony structure on the snout. The female does not have this structure.

== Behavior ==
During a 1997 study, researchers discovered that adult O'Shaughnessy's chameleons are most active in the morning and the evening.

== Reproduction ==
Calumma oshaughnessyi is oviparous.

== Conservation and threats ==
Although in some places common, O'Shaughnessy's chameleon is severely threatened. Its populations are declining and fragmented, and the species is ranked as vulnerable by the International Union for Conservation of Nature. Although reports of illegal trade in the species do exist, its primary threat is habitat loss, such as logging and deforestation. While significant populations do exist in protected areas, further loss of inhabitable terrain could fragment and isolate these communities.
