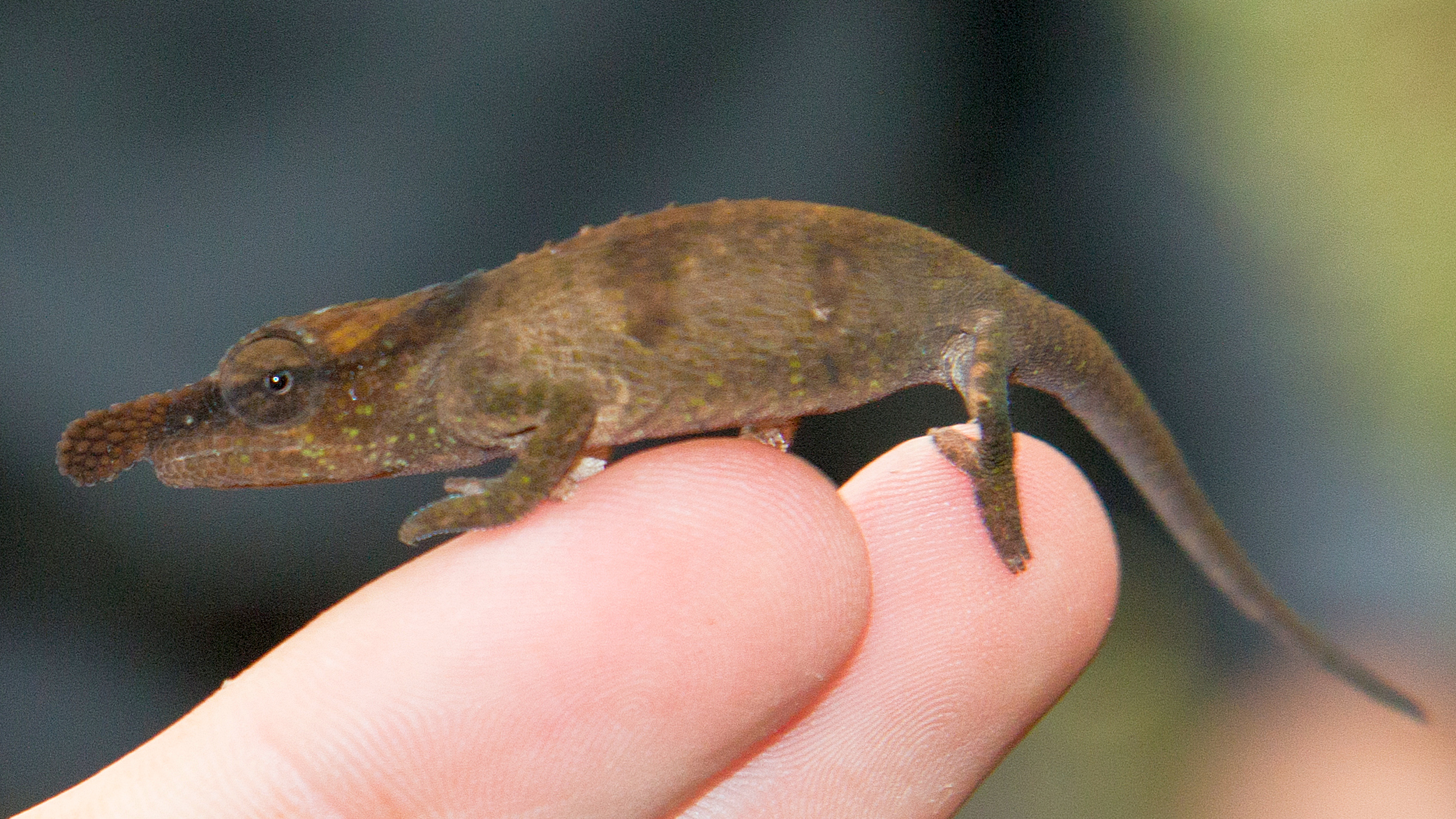

Conservation status
- Least Concern (IUCN 3.1)

Scientific classification
- Kingdom: Animalia
- Phylum: Chordata
- Class: Reptilia
- Order: Squamata
- Suborder: Iguania
- Family: Chamaeleonidae
- Genus: Calumma
- Species: C. boettgeri

Binomial name
- Calumma boettgeri (Boulenger, 1888)
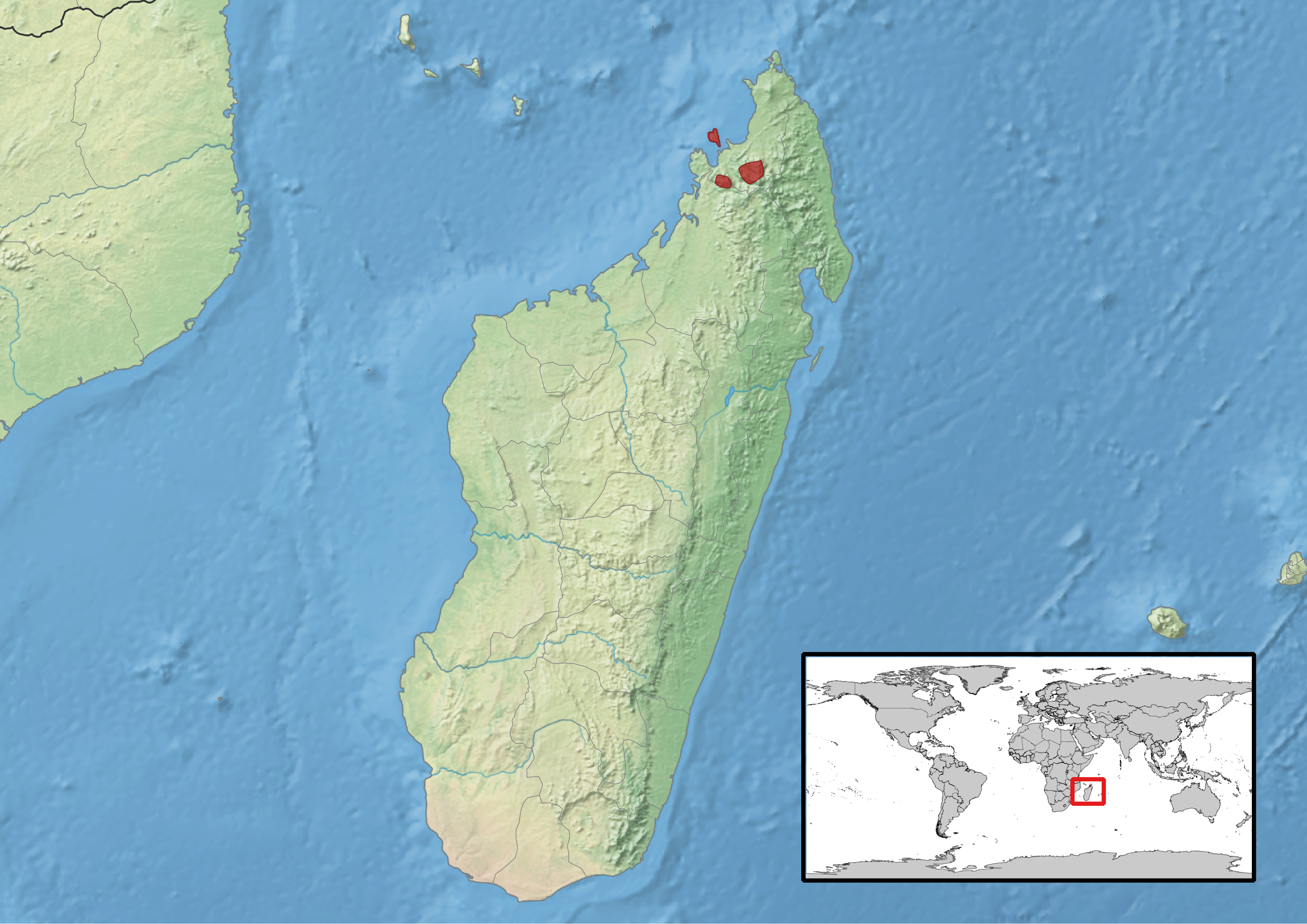

Synonyms
- Chamaeleon boettgeri Boulenger, 1888; Chamaeleon macrorhinus Barbour, 1903; Chamaeleon boettgeri — F. Werner, 1911; Chamaeleo boettgeri — Mertens, 1966; Calumma boettgeri — Klaver & Böhme, 1986

= Calumma boettgeri =

Species of lizard

Calumma boettgeri is a species of chameleon, a lizard in the family Chamaeleonidae. The species is endemic to Madagascar.

== Etymology ==
The specific name, boettgeri, is in honor of German herpetologist Oskar Boettger.

== Geographic range ==
C. boettgeri is found in northern Madagascar, including the island of Nosy Be.

== Habitat ==
The preferred natural habitat of C. boettgeri is forest, at altitudes of 810–1,200 m (2,660–3,940 ft).

== Description ==
C. boettgeri may attain a snout-to-vent length (SVL) of 5.5 cm (2.2 in), and tail length equals SVL.

== Behavior ==
C. boettgeri is arboreal, and is usually found 1–2 m (3.3–6.6 ft) above the forest floor.

== Reproduction ==
C. boettgeri is oviparous.
