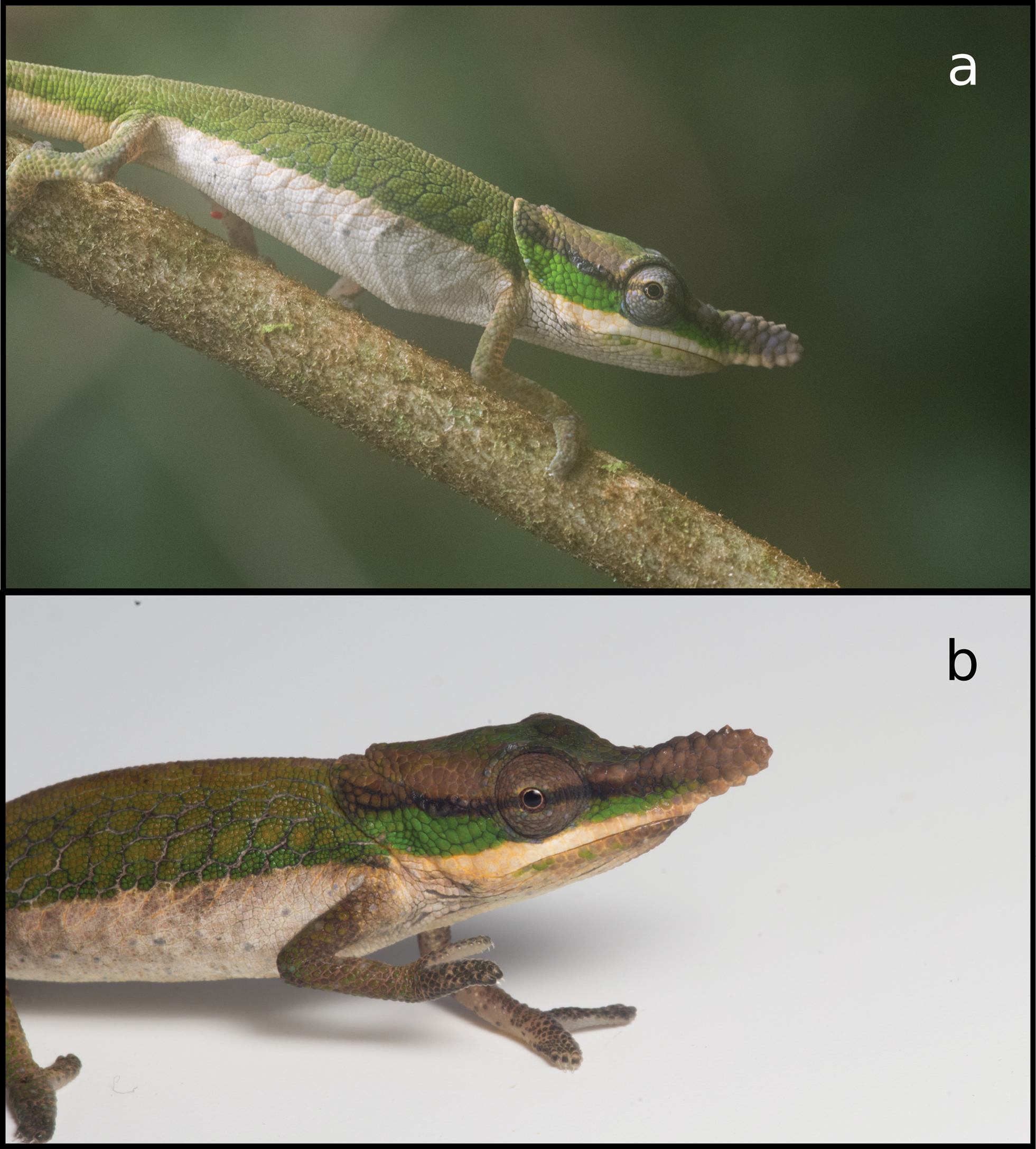

Scientific classification
- Kingdom: Animalia
- Phylum: Chordata
- Class: Reptilia
- Order: Squamata
- Suborder: Iguania
- Family: Chamaeleonidae
- Genus: Calumma
- Species: C. roaloko

Binomial name
- Calumma roaloko Prötzel, Lambert, Andrianasolo, Hutter, Cobb, Scherz, & Glaw, 2018

= Calumma roaloko =

Species of lizard

Calumma roaloko, the two-toned soft-nosed chameleon, is a species of chameleon found in Madagascar. It was described by the herpetologist David Prötzel and colleagues in 2018 and is named after its distinctive two-toned colouration. The species is sexually dichromatic. Males have an upper half of the body that is olive green to bright green, while the lower half is beige to white, continuing onto the tail. Females generally have brown and tan or cream lower halves. Both sexes can display a dark brown or beige net-like pattern, caused by skin between scales.

The chameleon's current known range is restricted to a small fragment of mid-elevation rainforest in the Réserve de Ressources Naturelles du Corridor Ankeniheny-Zahamena, a protected area in Alaotra-Mangoro, Madagascar. The species has only been found above elevations of 1100 m, although this elevational distribution is hard to confirm as most forests below 1000 m in the species' range have been cleared. Both the sites from which it was recorded are near the edge of the forest fragments they are located in, suggested the species may have a preference for or at least a tolerance of degraded habitat. The authors of the study describing the species recommended it be classified as being endangered due to its highly fragmented forest habitat, which is rapidly decreasing in both size and quality.

== Taxonomy ==
Calumma roaloko was described by the herpetologist David Prötzel and colleagues in 2018 on the basis of an adult male specimen collected from near Vohidrazana in Alaotra-Mangoro, Madagascar. It is named after its distinctive two-toned colouration. The specific epithet is derived from the Malagasy words roa, meaning 'two', and loko, meaning 'colour'. The recommended English name for the species is two-toned soft-nosed chameleon, while the recommended Malagasy name is Tanalahy roa loko.

== Description ==
The species is sexually dichromatic. Males have an upper half of the body that is olive green to bright green, while the lower half is beige to white, continuing onto the tail. Females generally have brown and tan or cream lower halves. Both sexes can display a dark brown or beige net-like pattern, caused by skin between scales. The limbs are indistinct brown or beige. The throat and upper labial scales are beige in both sexes. The rostral appendage is brown and is the same colour as the upper head region. It can, alongside the eyes, turn violet in males. In females, the appendage can turn yellowish.

== Distribution and habitat ==
The chameleon's current known range is restricted to a small fragment of mid-elevation rainforest in the Réserve de Ressources Naturelles du Corridor Ankeniheny-Zahamena, a protected area in Alaotra-Mangoro, Madagascar. It may also occur in several nearby protected areas, including Analamazaotra and Andasibe-Mantadia National Parks, as well as some smaller forest fragments west of its type locality. Specimens of the species were encountered sleeping at night on leaves or small branches, and were most often spotted around 2–5 m above the ground. The species has only been found above elevations of 1100 m, although this elevational distribution is hard to confirm as most forests below 1000 m in the species' range have been cleared. Both the sites from which it was recorded are near the edge of the forest fragments they are located in, suggested the species may have a preference for or at least a tolerance of degraded habitat. Alternatively, this may be because the species is outperformed in primary forest by its congeners.

== Ecology ==
Calumma roaloko is known to be parasitized by mites.

The authors of the study describing the species recommended it be classified as being endangered due to its highly fragmented forest habitat, which is rapidly decreasing in both size and quality.
