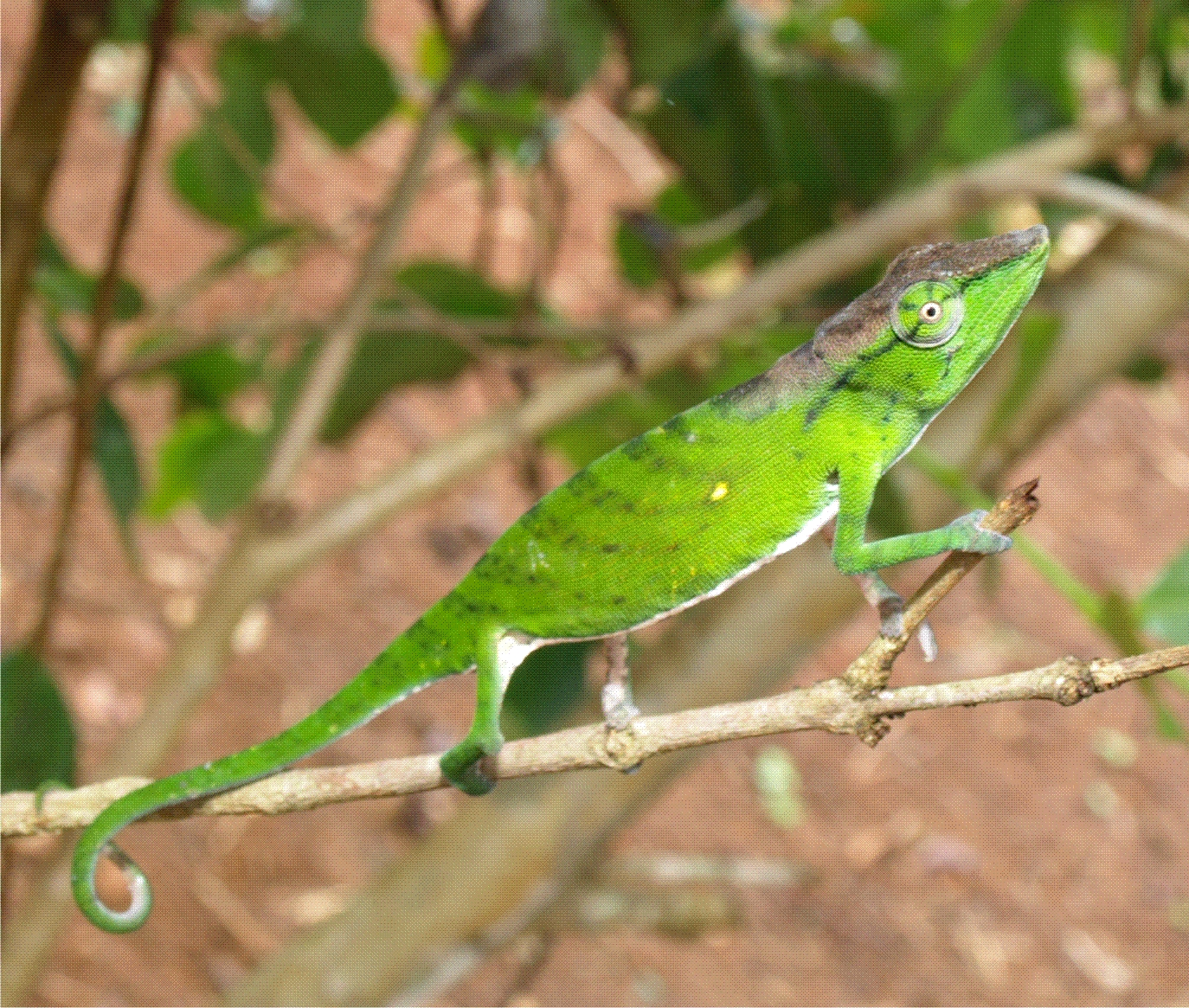
- Male

Conservation status
- Endangered (IUCN 3.1)

Scientific classification
- Kingdom: Animalia
- Phylum: Chordata
- Class: Reptilia
- Order: Squamata
- Suborder: Iguania
- Family: Chamaeleonidae
- Genus: Calumma
- Species: C. tarzan

Binomial name
- Calumma tarzan Gehring, Pabijan, Ratsoavina, J. Köhler, Vences & Glaw, 2010
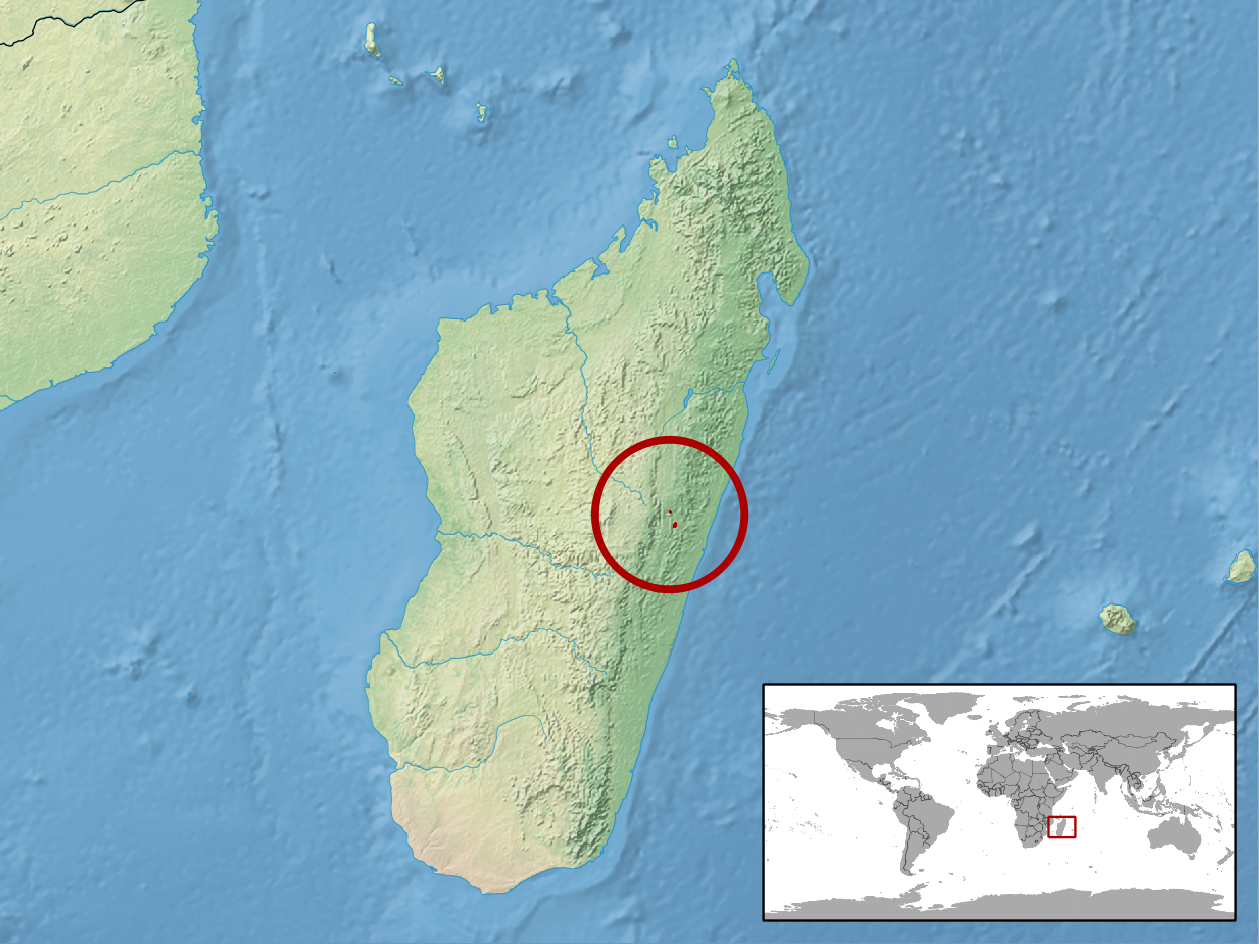

= Calumma tarzan =

Species of chameleon endemic to Madagascar

Calumma tarzan, also known commonly as the Tarzan chameleon or Tarzan's chameleon, is a species of lizard in the family Chamaeleonidae. The species is endemic to the Alaotra-Mangoro region in Madagascar.

== Etymology ==
The specific name, tarzan, is in honor of Tarzan, the fictional jungle dweller created by Edgar Rice Burroughs.

== Physical characteristics ==
C. tarzan is approximately 119–150 mm (4.7–5.9 in) in total length, 61–72 mm (2.4–2.8 in) in snout-vent length (SVL), with anteriorly fused rostral crests to form a "spade-like" snout that projects 1 millimeter beyond its snout tip. The chameleon has green to light yellow coloration and has a dark transversal band when it is stressed. This species has a very low casque in comparison to other chameleons.

== Sexual dimorphism ==
C. tarzan males exhibit a brown to blackish casque and necks while females have a green to light yellow casque and neck. Females have a less pronounced rectangular rostral profile than males in the species.

== Geographic range and habitat ==
C. tarzan is endemic to central east Madagascar. This chameleon is found in forest fragments outside of Tarzanville, Province Moramanga, Madagascar.

== Reproduction ==
C. tarzan is oviparous.

== Conservation ==
Madagascar has been subject to rampant fragmentation of forest habitats. Areas in Madagascar that are major protected areas suffer from forest fragmentation because of poor governance and subverted judicial control. The increase in forest fragmentation has created habitats that are not suitable for large mammals and some species of birds. This has made some flagship species of the island, like lemurs and some species of birds, to find refuge in non-fragmented forests. Biologists have named C. tarzan a flagship species because of its colorful appearance and because the area lacks other flagship species from Madagascar. Biologists are using this species to try to support and purpose significance in conservation of fragmented forests in Madagascar.
