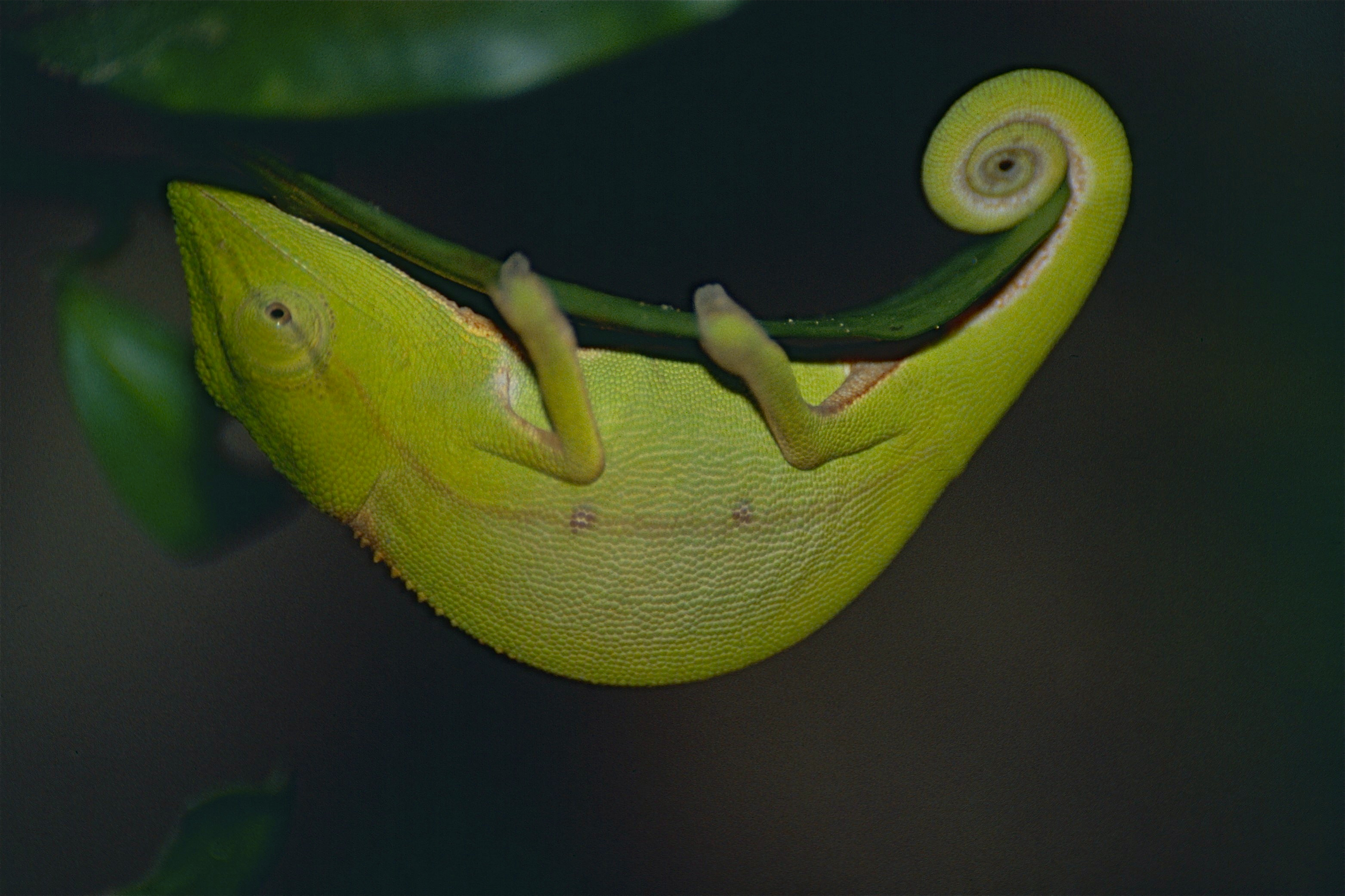

Conservation status
- Least Concern (IUCN 3.1)

Scientific classification
- Kingdom: Animalia
- Phylum: Chordata
- Class: Reptilia
- Order: Squamata
- Suborder: Iguania
- Family: Chamaeleonidae
- Genus: Calumma
- Species: C. gastrotaenia

Binomial name
- Calumma gastrotaenia (Boulenger, 1888)
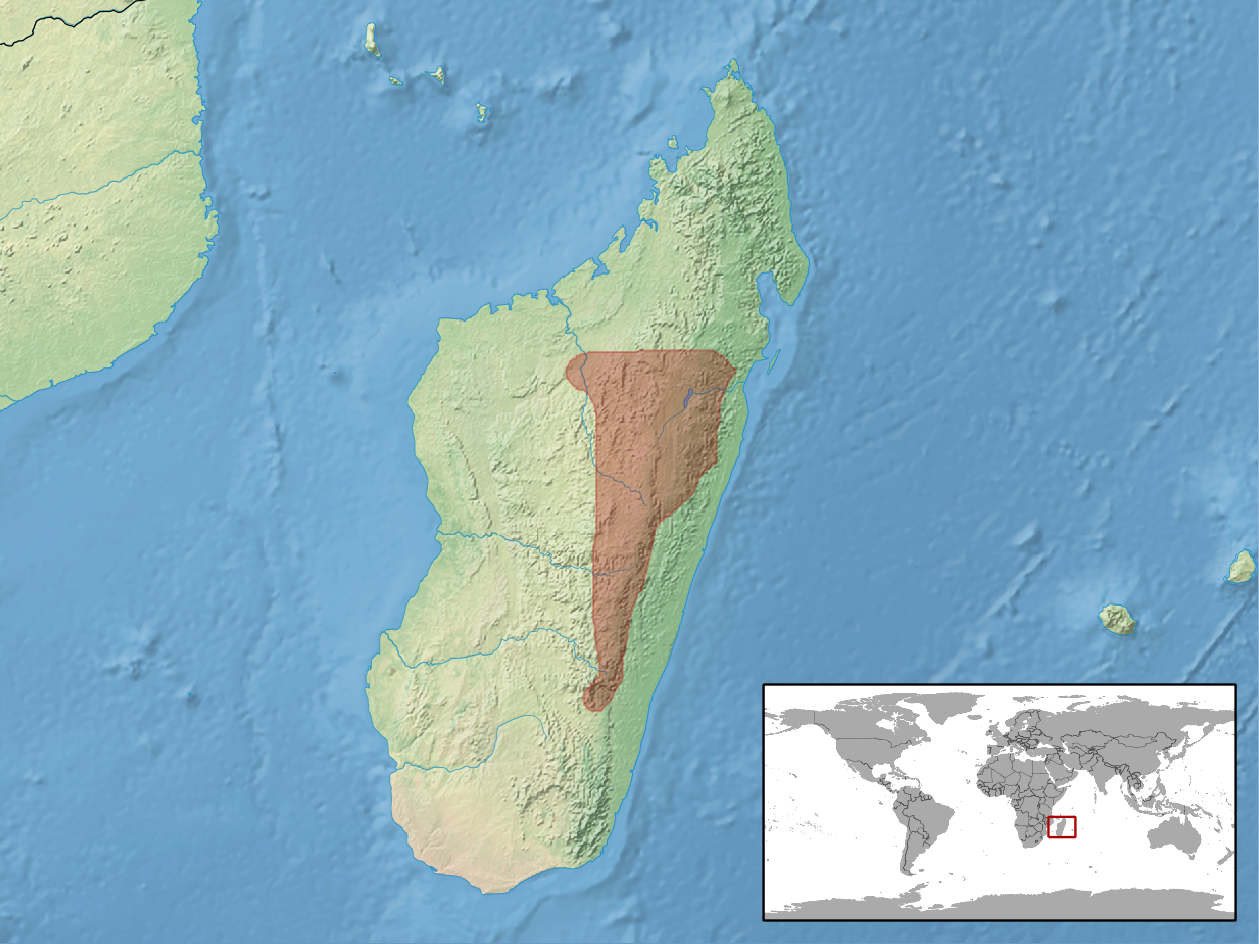

Synonyms
- Chamaeleon gastrotaenia; Chamaeleon grandidier

= Perinet chameleon =

Species of lizard

The Perinet chameleon (Calumma gastrotaenia), also known as the Malagasy side-striped chameleon, is a small species of chameleon endemic to humid primary forests, particularly along rivers, in eastern and central Madagascar at elevations between 600 and 1,530 m. It is listed on CITES Appendix II, and as such, trade in the Perinet chameleon is regulated. Exporting the species from Madagascar has been banned since 1995.

== Description ==
Perinet chameleons are small and slender, reaching 15–20 cm, with elongated heads and bodies. They have smooth, uniformly green, brown or yellow skin with white undersides. A thin stripe runs from their tail bases along the sides of their bodies and across their eyes, and may include white spots. The three subspecies are C. g. andringitraensis with a dorsal crest, C. g. marojezensis. and C. g. guillaumeti. The male Perinet chameleon is larger than the female and has a bony head crest.
