= Calumma uetzi =

Scientific classification
- Kingdom: Animalia
- Phylum: Chordata
- Class: Reptilia
- Order: Squamata
- Suborder: Iguania
- Family: Chamaeleonidae
- Genus: Calumma
- Species: C. uetzi

Binomial name
- Calumma uetzi Prötzel, Vences, Hawlitschek, Scherz, Ratsoavina, & Glaw, 2018

Species of lizard

Calumma uetzi, Uetz's soft-nosed chameleon, is a species of chameleon found in Madagascar.
