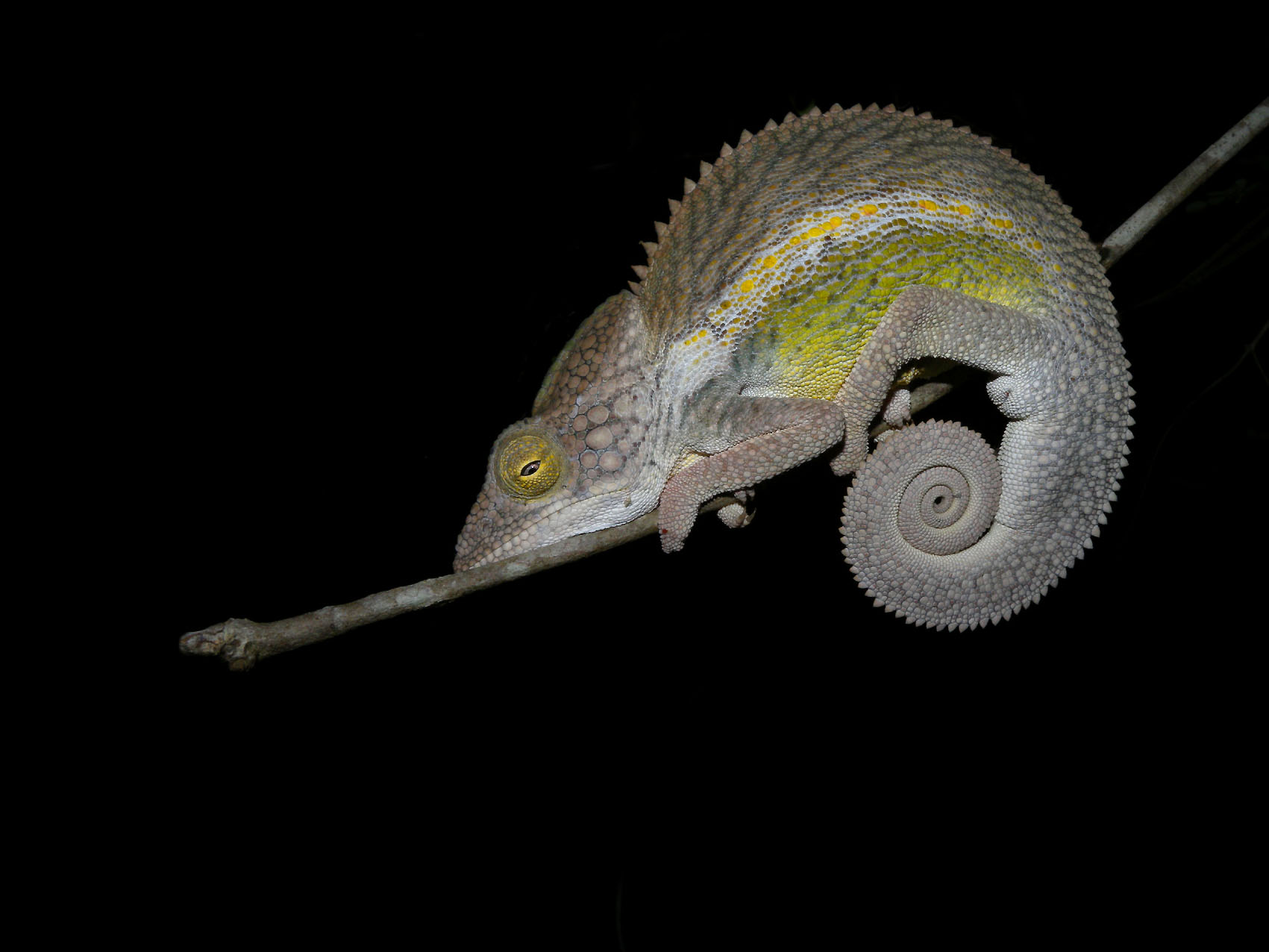

Conservation status
- Endangered (IUCN 3.1)

Scientific classification
- Kingdom: Animalia
- Phylum: Chordata
- Class: Reptilia
- Order: Squamata
- Suborder: Iguania
- Family: Chamaeleonidae
- Genus: Furcifer
- Species: F. nicosiai

Binomial name
- Furcifer nicosiai Jesu, Mattioli & Schimmenti, 1999
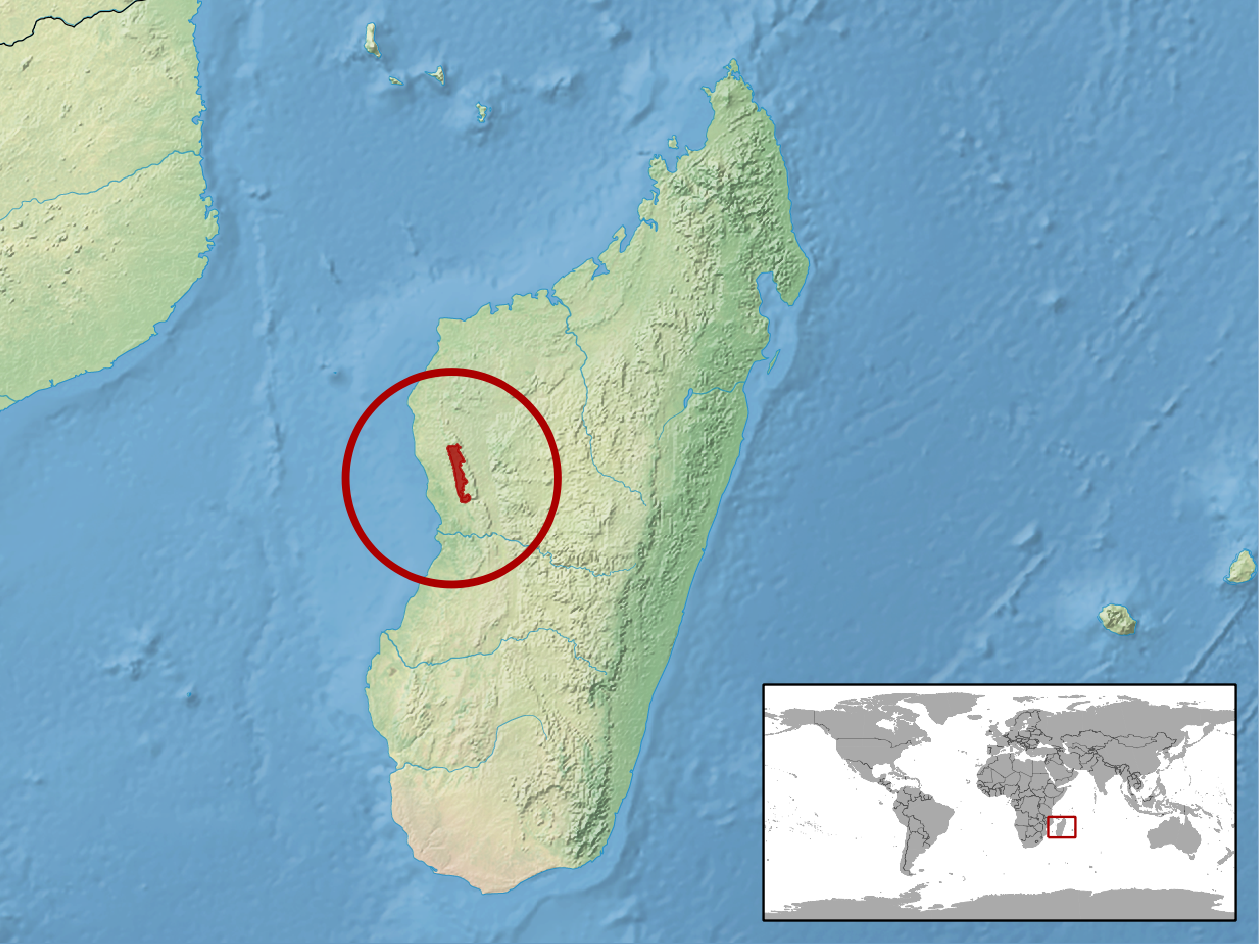

= Furcifer nicosiai =

Species of lizard

Furcifer nicosiai is a large species of chameleon, a lizard in the family Chamaeleonidae. The species is endemic to western Madagascar. Described as new to science in 1999, it was ranked as an endangered species by the International Union for Conservation of Nature (IUCN). It has only been found in the Tsingy de Bemaraha National Park at levels of 57 and 571 metres (187 and 1,873 feet) above mean sea level.

== Etymology ==
The specific name, nicosiai, is in honor of Guido Nicosia, Italian Ambassador to Madagascar (1996–1999).

== Description ==
Furcifer nicosiai is relatively large, and has a high parietal crest (a central ridge down the front of the casque), but lacks appendages on its snout (rostrum). It features canthi rostrales that are separated, a poorly developed gular crest (a row of small spines running down the centre of the throat), a distinctive rostral profile, a complete ventral crest (a row of small conical scales extending down the centre of the belly) and a poorly developed dorsal crest extending from the neck region to the tail. It is similar in appearance to Furcifer verrucosus, with which it is similarly sexually dimorphic. Furcifer nicosiai can be distinguished from F. verrucosus by its smaller size, different colour patterns, and the orientation of its hemipenis.

== Distribution and habitat ==
Furcifer nicosiai is found in the limestone outcrops in a small area of west Madagascar, in the Melaky Region, north of the Manambolo River. It has only been found in the Tsingy de Bemaraha National Park (Parc National Tsingy de Bemaraha) though there is a possibility that it may also be found further north. The size of the park is 1,566 square kilometres (605 square miles), although it is not fully covered with forest habitat suitable for this species. It has been recorded between 57 and 571 metres (187 and 1,873 feet) above mean sea level. The IUCN has ranked Furcifer nicosiai as an Endangered species. Its population is believed to be in decline. The major threat to the species is the fragmentation, loss and degradation of the forest it lives in, which includes damaging human activities like agriculture, logging, and the clearing of land by fire.

== Taxonomy ==
Furcifer nicosiai was initially described by Jesu, Mattioli and Schimmenti in 1999. The type specimens were collected in February and March 1997, during the rainy season. The Furcifer oustaleti, Furcifer verrucosus and Furcifer nicosiai, group of Chamaeleonidae may well contain other undescribed species and needs a major revision according to the IUCN Red List of Threatened Species.
