= St. Mary's Churchyard =

St Mary's Churchyard may refer to:

- St. Mary's Episcopal Church, Burlington, New Jersey
- St Mary's Churchyard, Hendon, London
