= Abraham Raimbach =

English engraver (1776–1843)

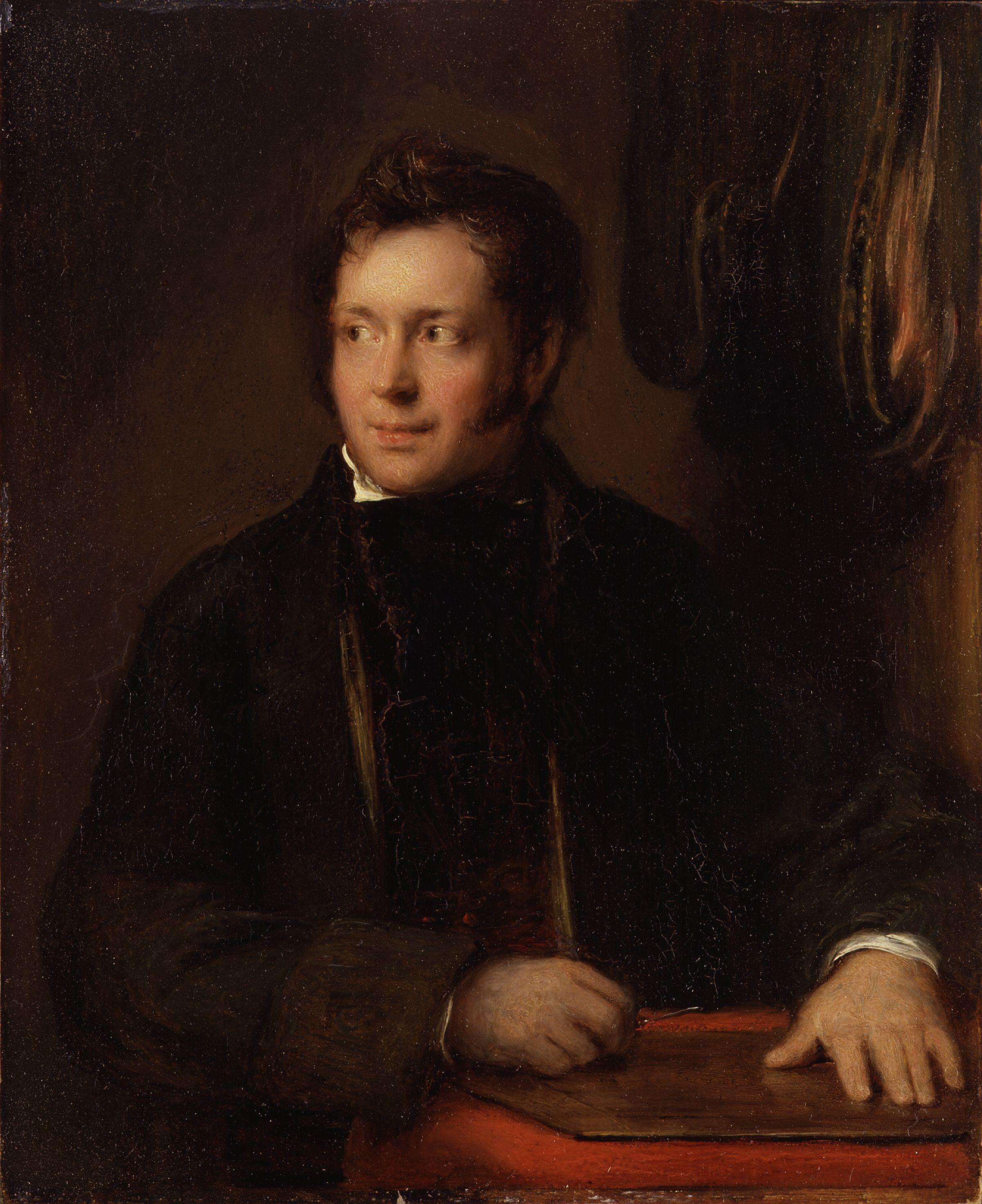
1818 portrait of Abraham Raimbach by David Wilkie

Abraham Raimbach (16 February 1776 in London – 17 January 1843), was an English engraver of Swiss descent.

He was born in Cecil Court in the West End of London. Educated at Archbishop Tenison's Library School, he was apprenticed to the engraver J. Hall from 1789 to 1796. For nine years, part of his working-time was devoted to the study of drawing in the Royal Academy and to carrying out occasional engravings for the booksellers, whilst his leisure hours were employed in painting portraits in miniature. Having formed an intimacy with Sir David Wilkie, Raimbach in 1812 began to engrave some of Wilkie's best pictures. At his death, he held a gold medal awarded for his Village Politicians at the Paris Exhibition of 1814. He was elected corresponding member of the Académie des Beaux-Arts in 1835.

He is buried in St Mary's Churchyard, Hendon.

== Gallery ==
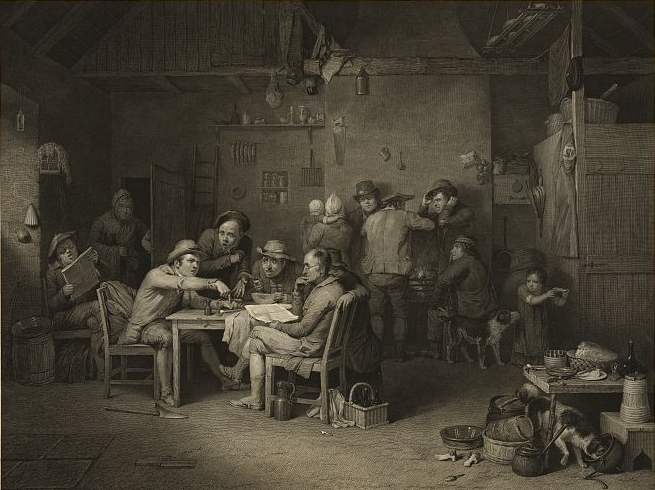
Village Politicians by Abraham Raimbach after David Wilkie

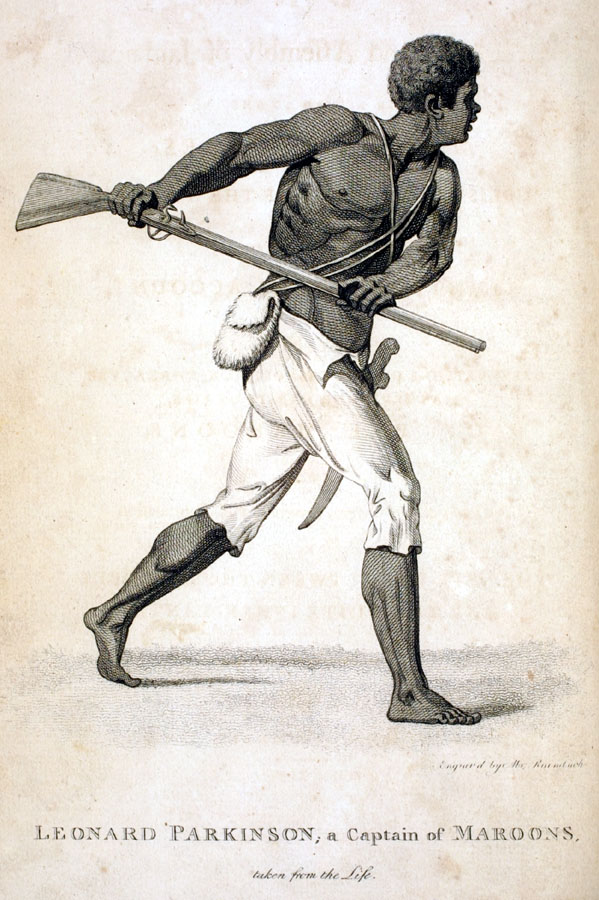
Leonard Parkinson, Maroon Leader, Jamaica, 1796
