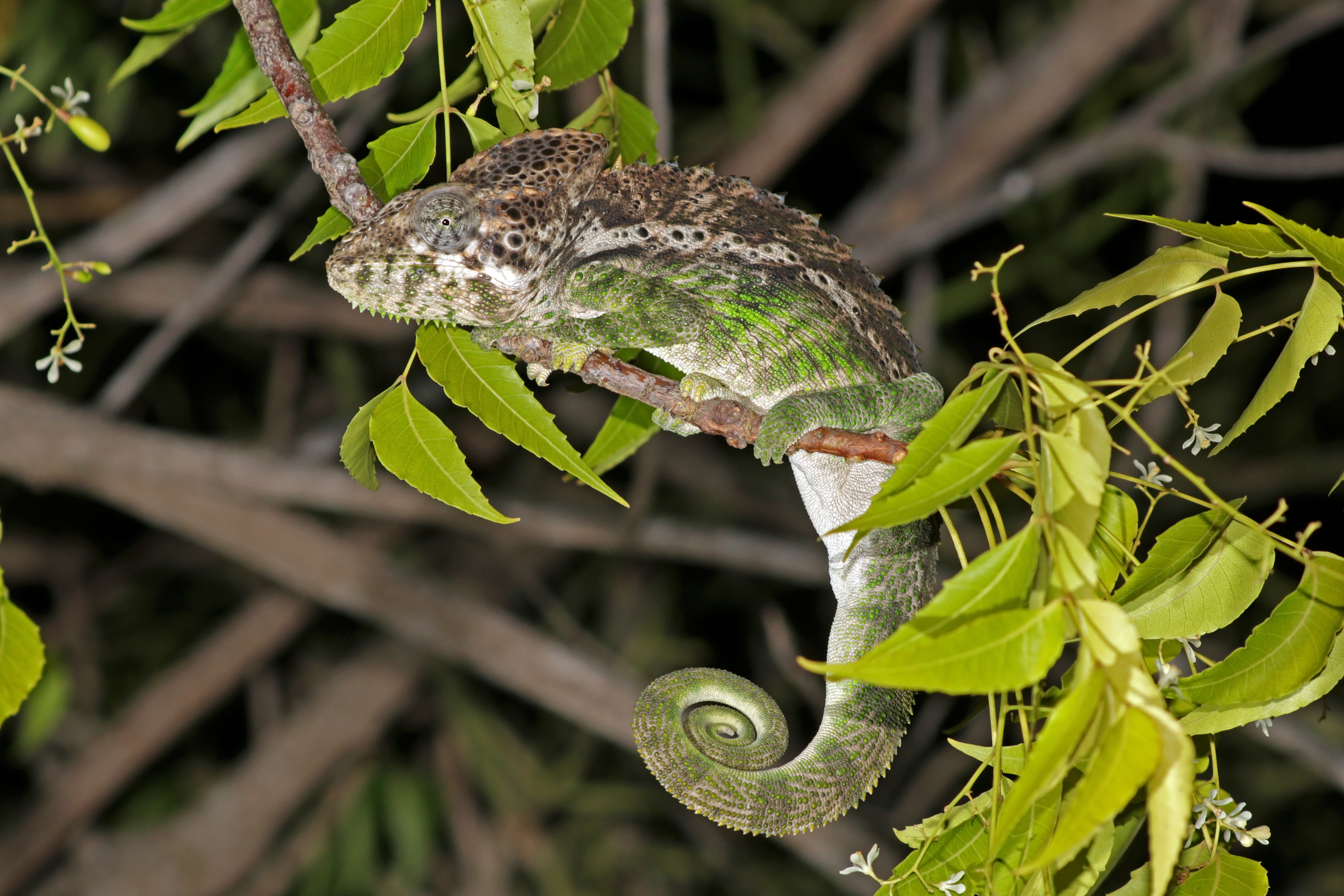
- male, Arboretum d'Antsokay

Conservation status
- Least Concern (IUCN 3.1)

Scientific classification
- Kingdom: Animalia
- Phylum: Chordata
- Class: Reptilia
- Order: Squamata
- Suborder: Iguania
- Family: Chamaeleonidae
- Genus: Furcifer
- Species: F. verrucosus

Binomial name
- Furcifer verrucosus (Cuvier, 1829)
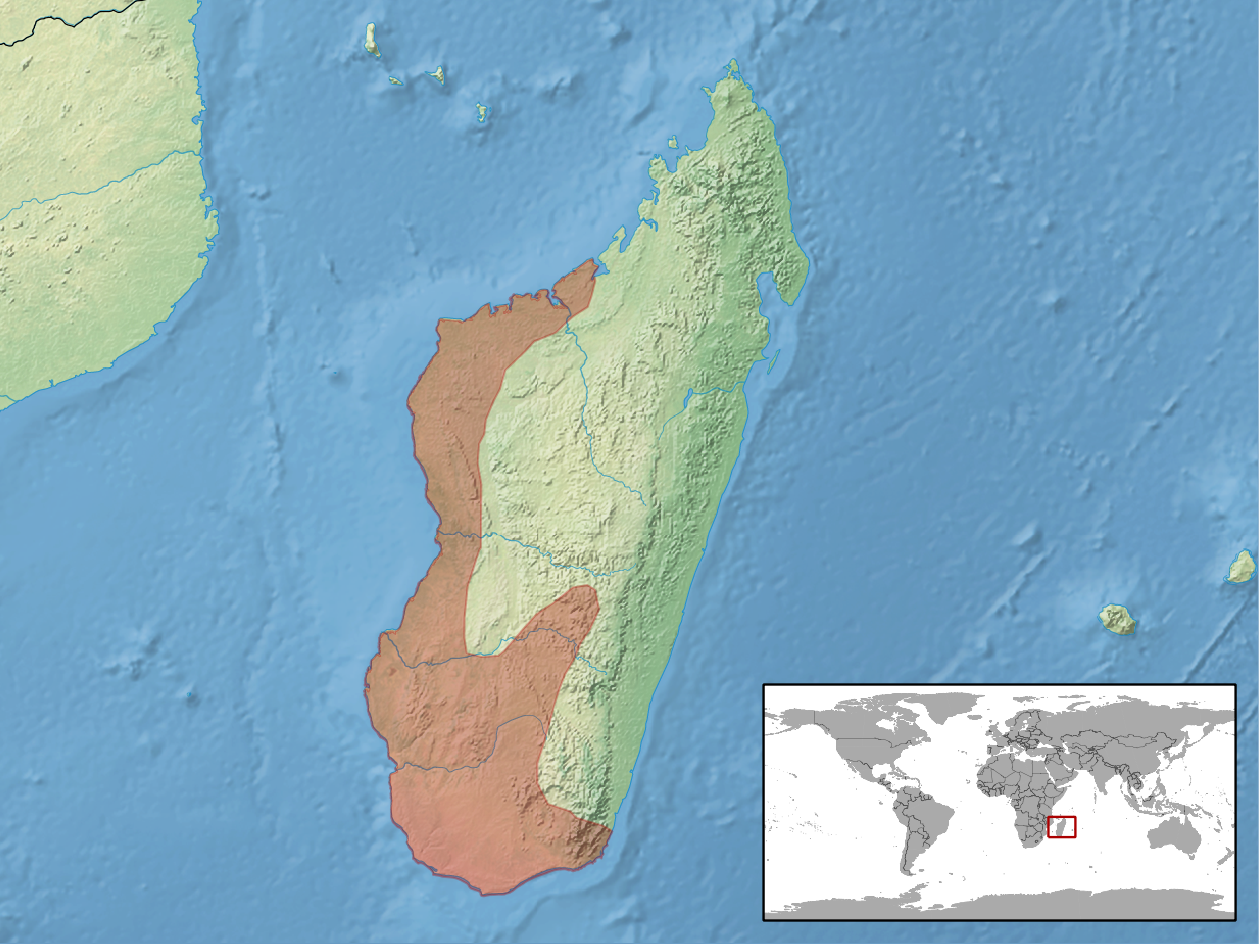

Synonyms
- Chamaeleo verrucosus Cuvier, 1829; Chamaeleon monilifer Gray, 1831; Chamaeleon verrucosus Gray, 1865; Chamaeleon semicristatus Boettger, 1894; Chamaeleo verrucosus semicristatus Mertens, 1966

= Furcifer verrucosus =

Species of lizard

Furcifer verrucosus, also known as the warty chameleon, spiny chameleon or crocodile chameleon, is a species of reptile endemic to Madagascar. It was first described by Georges Cuvier in 1829.

== Taxonomy ==
There are two subspecies, Furcifer v. verrucosus and Furcifer v. semicristatus, the latter being found mainly in the southernmost part of the island. This chameleon is closely related to Oustalet's chameleon Furcifer oustaleti (Malagasy giant chameleon), the pair forming a species complex, but each member of the group may be a cryptic species (two species indistinguishable in the field and currently believed to be a single species) and the exact taxonomical relationship between members of the group is unclear. New evidence has come to light that suggest that the two species are sister species and have differentiated as early as the Plio-Pleistocene Era. The species used to be only known as Furcifer oustaleti, but Jean-Francois Mocquard in 1894 noticed some morphological differences in the crests of the two chameleons.

== Description ==
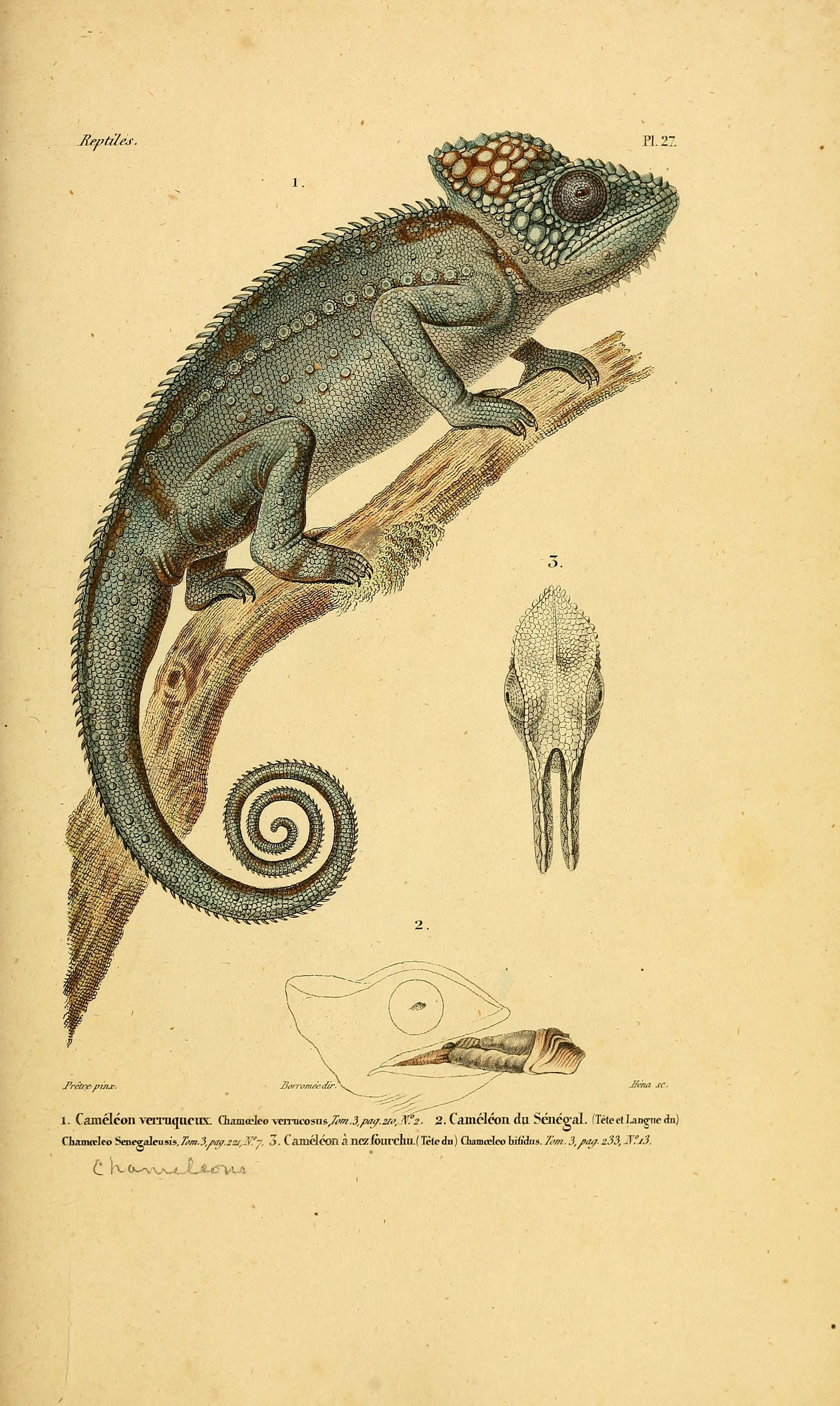

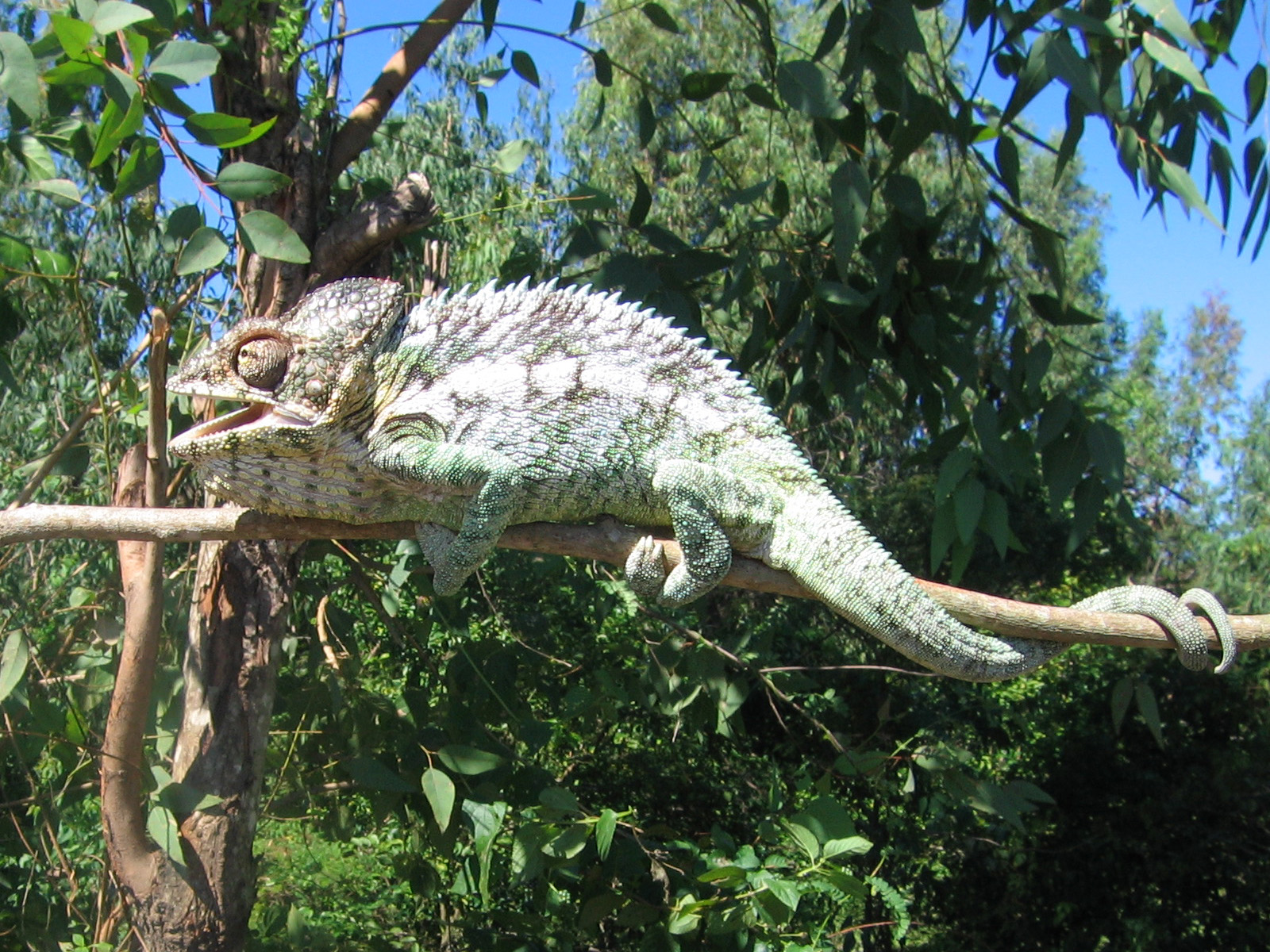
male, Berenty

The warty chameleon is a large species with males growing to a total length of 56 centimetres (22 in) and females reaching 21 cm (8 in). On its head it has a casque, a helmet-like crest formed from scales. A small crest runs along a raised ridge from its eyes to its snout. There are further low crests running along the flanks, down the throat and along the belly. A distinctive crest of up to forty 4 millimetres (0.16 in) spines runs along the back in males but this is cut short in females, continuing along the spine as tubercles. Both sexes have a row of large scales forming a lateral line. The long tail is prehensile. The general colour of this chameleon is grey or brown variously blotched or indistinctly banded, with a white intermittent streak along each side. Females are usually paler in colour and males are often tinged with green on the belly, tail and limbs.

== Distribution and habitat ==
The warty chameleon is found only on the island of Madagascar including Manderano in the Tulear region. It occurs over much of the west part of the island and in drier parts of the south. It is seldom found in primary rainforest but favours arid disturbed land, including near the sea. It is a terrestrial species and also climbs around in low bushes. In hot weather it sometimes retreats into a sandy burrow to keep cool. Both the Furcifer v. verrucosus and Furcifer v. oustaleti species are considered CITES species (Convention on International Trade in Endangered Species) and are protected from animal trafficking worldwide.

== Biology ==
The warty chameleon feeds largely on insects which it catches with its long sticky tongue. The female lays one clutch of 30 to 60 eggs a year and these are incubated for about 200 days. They hatch into juvenile chameleons which may take six months to a year to become mature.
