= St Mary's Church, Hendon =

Coordinates: 51.590977°N 0.228724°W

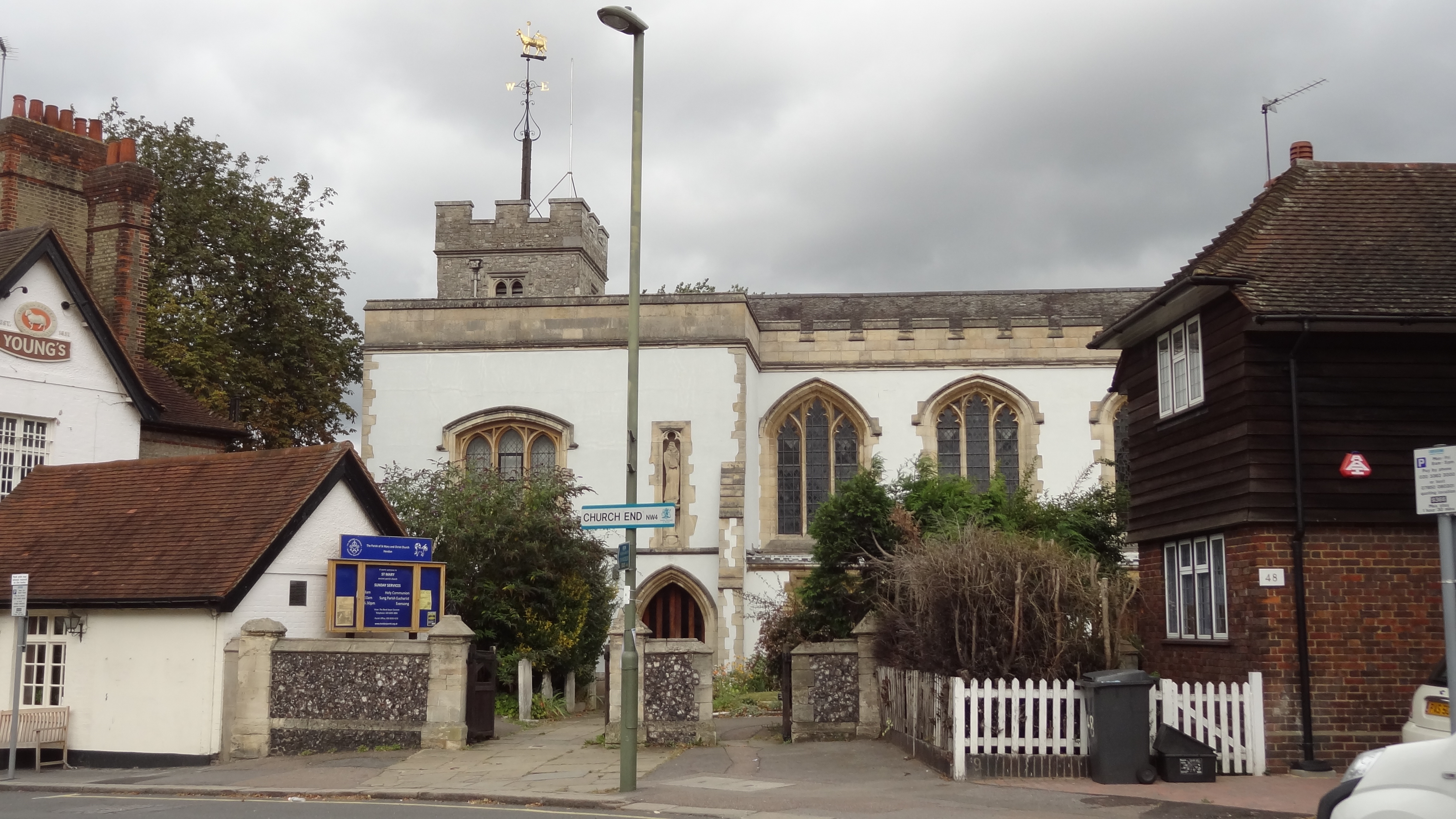
- St Mary's Church viewed from Church End
- St Mary's Church, Hendon
- Location: Church House, 49 Church End, Hendon, London NW4 4JT
- Country: England
- Denomination: Church of England
- Website: www.hendonparish.org.uk

History
- Founded: in 1080 or before
- Founder: unknown

Architecture
- Heritage designation: Grade II*
- Architect: various
- Style: English Gothic
- Years built: 1080, and two main further building phases

Administration
- Diocese: London
- Archdeaconry: Hampstead
- Deanery: Barnet
- Parish: St Mary and Christ Church, Hendon

Clergy
- Bishop(s): Bishop of Edmonton (London) & Bishop of London
- Rector: Andrew Worley and Peter Walker (Christ Church)
- Vicar: Julie Gittoes

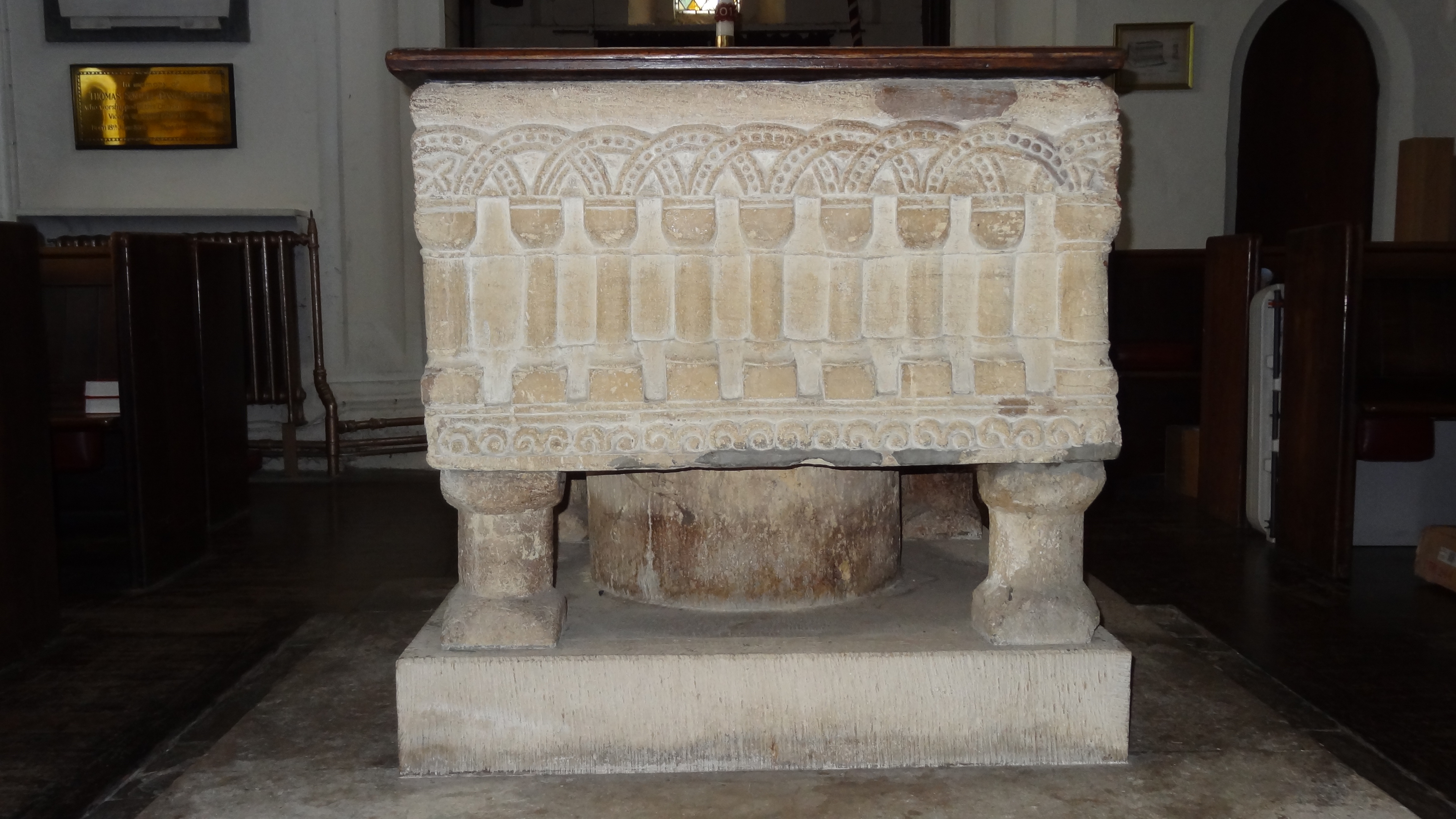
Norman font

St Mary's Church is the oldest (and Church of England) parish church in Hendon in the London Borough of Barnet. The mother church of Christ Church, Brent Street, the two form one parish in the Diocese of London.

== History ==
The church may date to Anglo-Saxon England. A spurious charter of "959" records the rectory as being owned by Westminster Abbey, and a priest is mentioned in 1086 in the Domesday Book, strongly implying the existence of a church, which was separately documented six years earlier. Associated archaeology has found near-certain Anglo-Saxon burials. The first definite date is the church built around 1080, and a Norman font (pictured below right) is still in use. The building has a thirteenth-century nave, chapel, north aisle and south arcade, together with traces of painting on the walls. The fifteenth and sixteenth centuries saw further rebuilding – the tower and south arcade reflect this phase.

In 1914-15 the church was extended with a larger nave designed by Temple Moore, living up to his name. His work was praised by Sir Nikolaus Pevsner, a much-published and read critic, as "one of the rare cases in which a Gothic revival architect, by respecting old work and frankly adding new work to it, has considerably enhanced the original effect".

Since 1950, the church has had grade II* listing (statutory protection and recognition, in the mid category).

== Memorials and churchyard ==
One of the most important memorials in the church is to Sir Stamford Raffles, the founder of Singapore, who lived locally at Highwood Hill, where he died in 1826. He is buried in the church. The churchyard is a Site of Local Importance for Nature Conservation together with the neighbouring Sunny Hill Park. It contains the grave of Herbert Chapman, the pre-war manager of Arsenal Football Club. Also in the churchyard are memorials to twenty Commonwealth service personnel, eleven from World War I and nine from World War II, most of whom are commemorated by a special memorial where graves could not be located.

== The Church today ==
The parish is served by a vicar.

== See also ==
- St Mary's Churchyard, Hendon
- List of church restorations and alterations by Temple Moore
