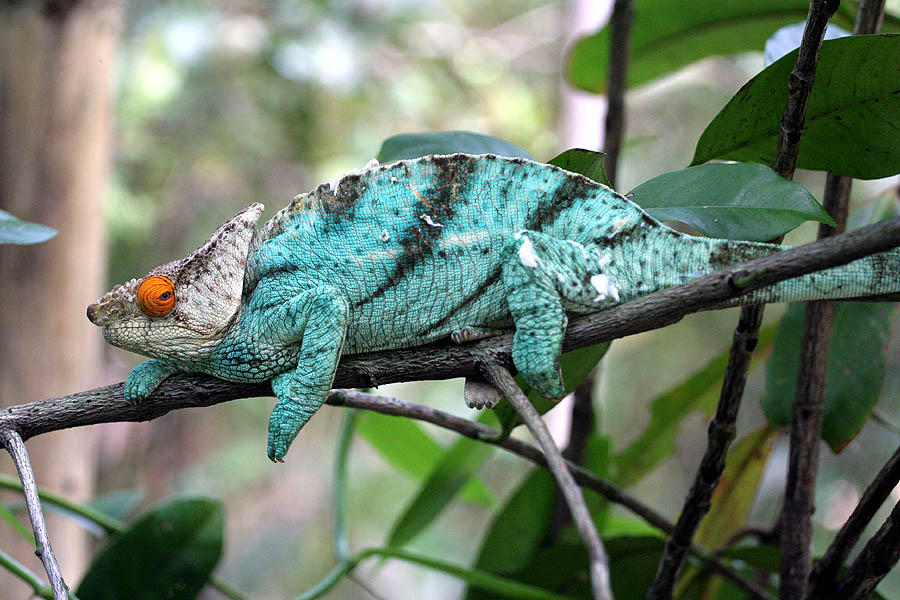
- Male Calumma parsonii parsonii, "orange eye" variant
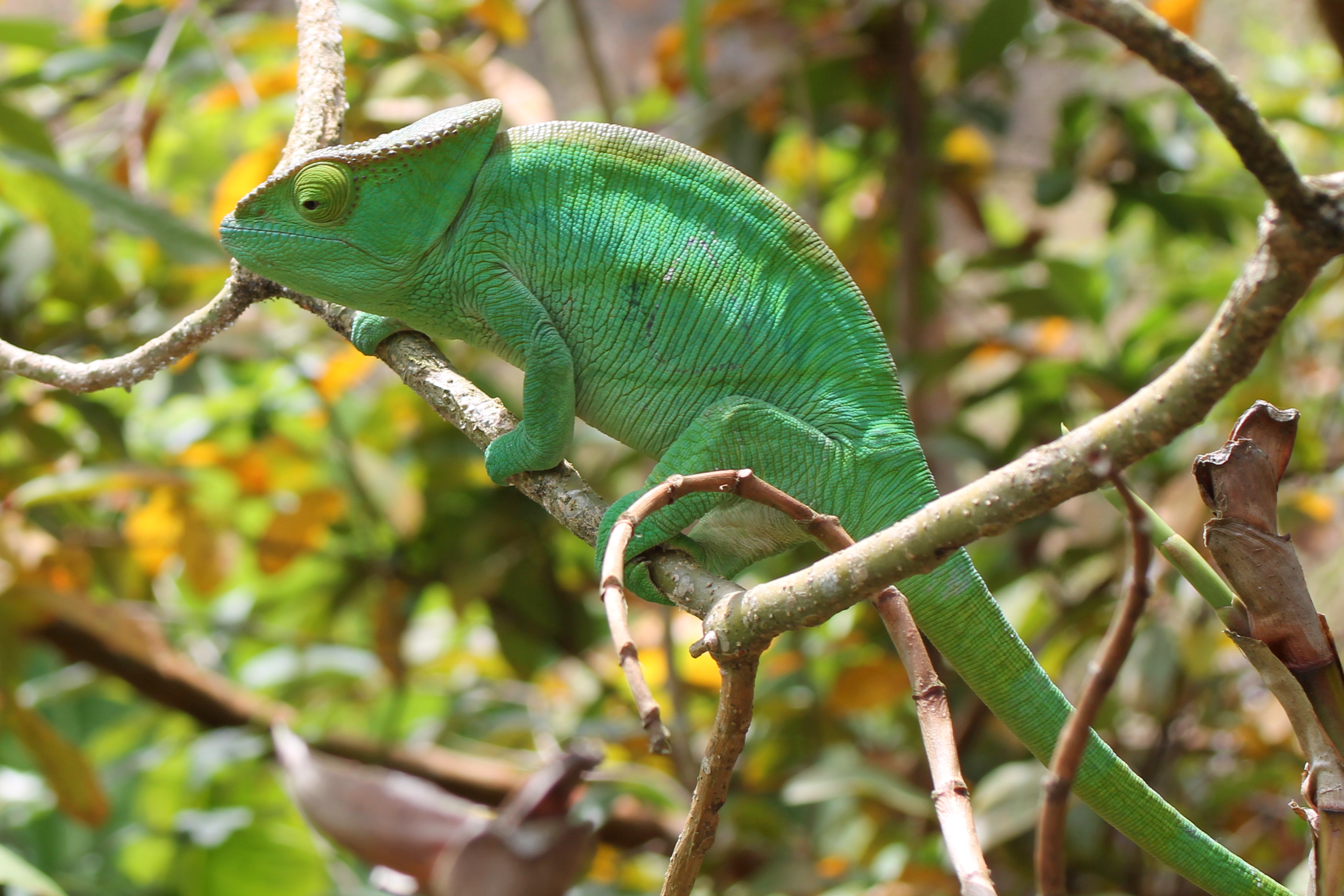
- Female C. p. parsonii

Conservation status
- Near Threatened (IUCN 3.1)

Scientific classification
- Kingdom: Animalia
- Phylum: Chordata
- Class: Reptilia
- Order: Squamata
- Suborder: Iguania
- Family: Chamaeleonidae
- Genus: Calumma
- Species: C. parsonii

Binomial name
- Calumma parsonii (Cuvier, 1824)
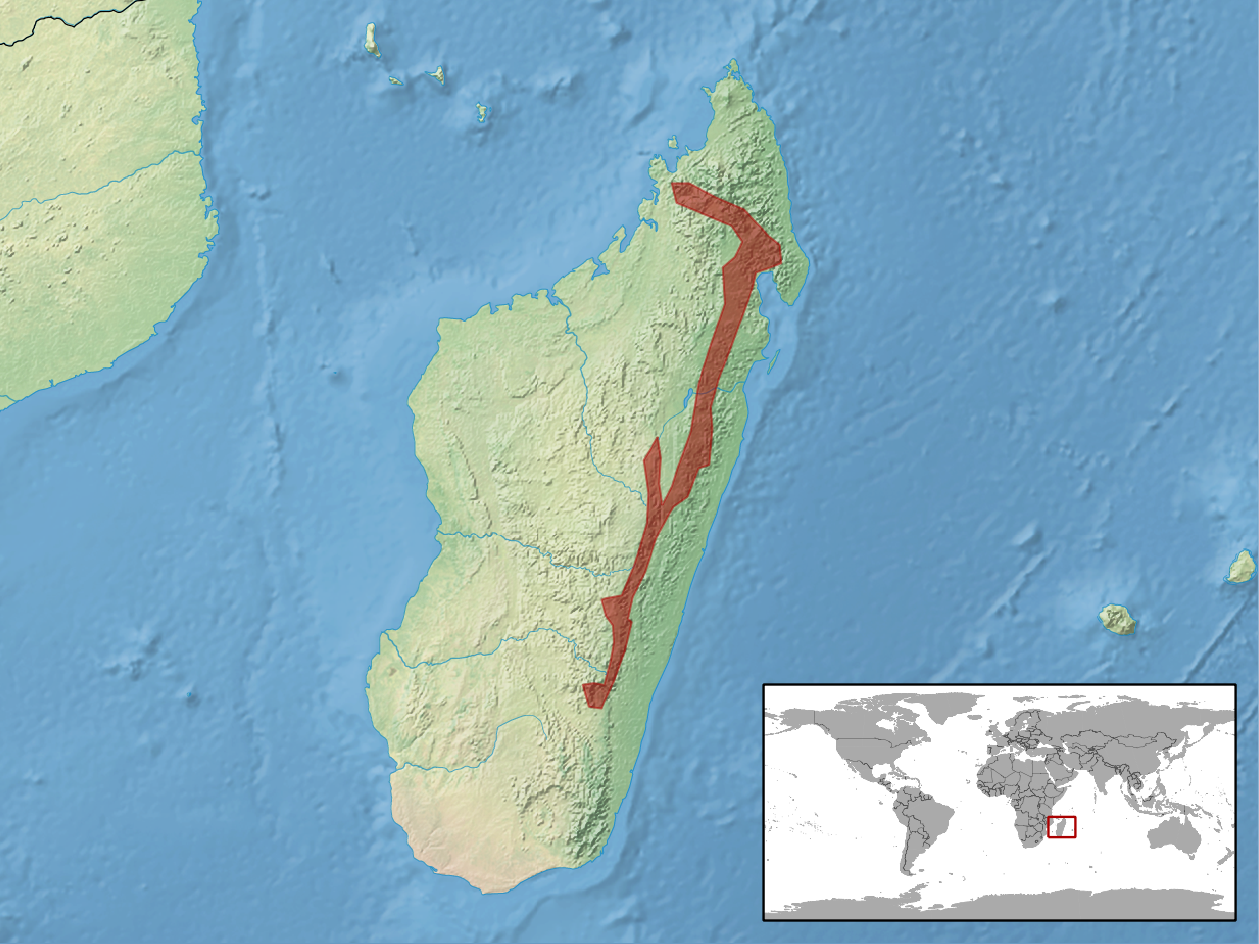

Synonyms
- Cameleonis rarissima Parsons, 1768 (nomen nudum); Chamaeleo parsonii Cuvier, 1824; Calumma parsonii — Klaver & Böhme, 1986

= Parson's chameleon =

Species of lizard

Parson's chameleon (Calumma parsonii) is a species of lizard in the family Chamaeleonidae. The species is endemic to eastern and northern Madagascar. It is found from lowlands to an altitude of 1,195 m (3,920 ft) above sea level and mainly inhabits humid primary forest, but can also occur in disturbed habitats with trees. For a chameleon, it is very large, long-lived, and slow-reproducing.

== Etymology ==
The specific name, parsonii, was coined in 1824 by Georges Cuvier in honor of British physician James Parsons.

== Description ==
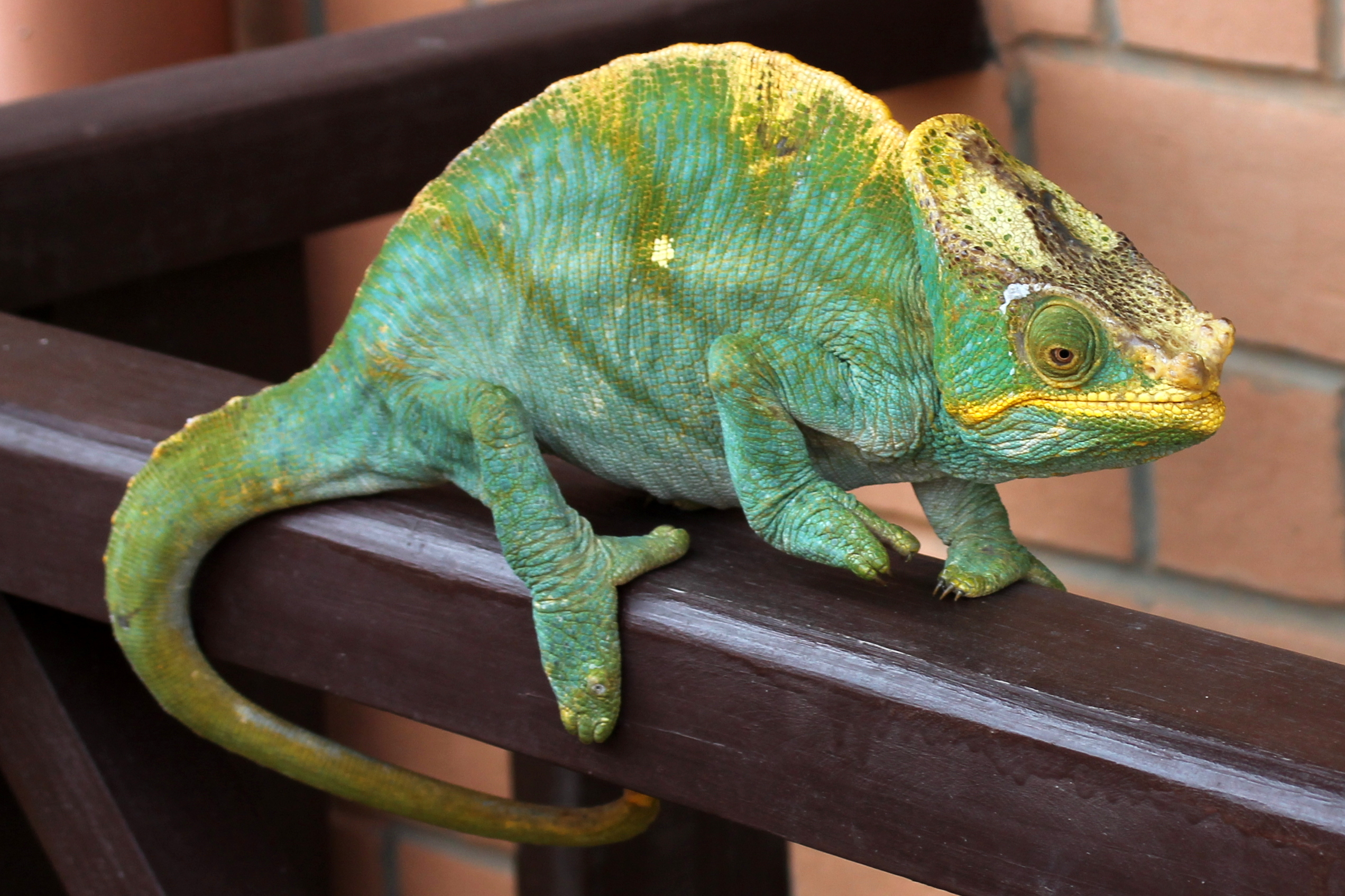
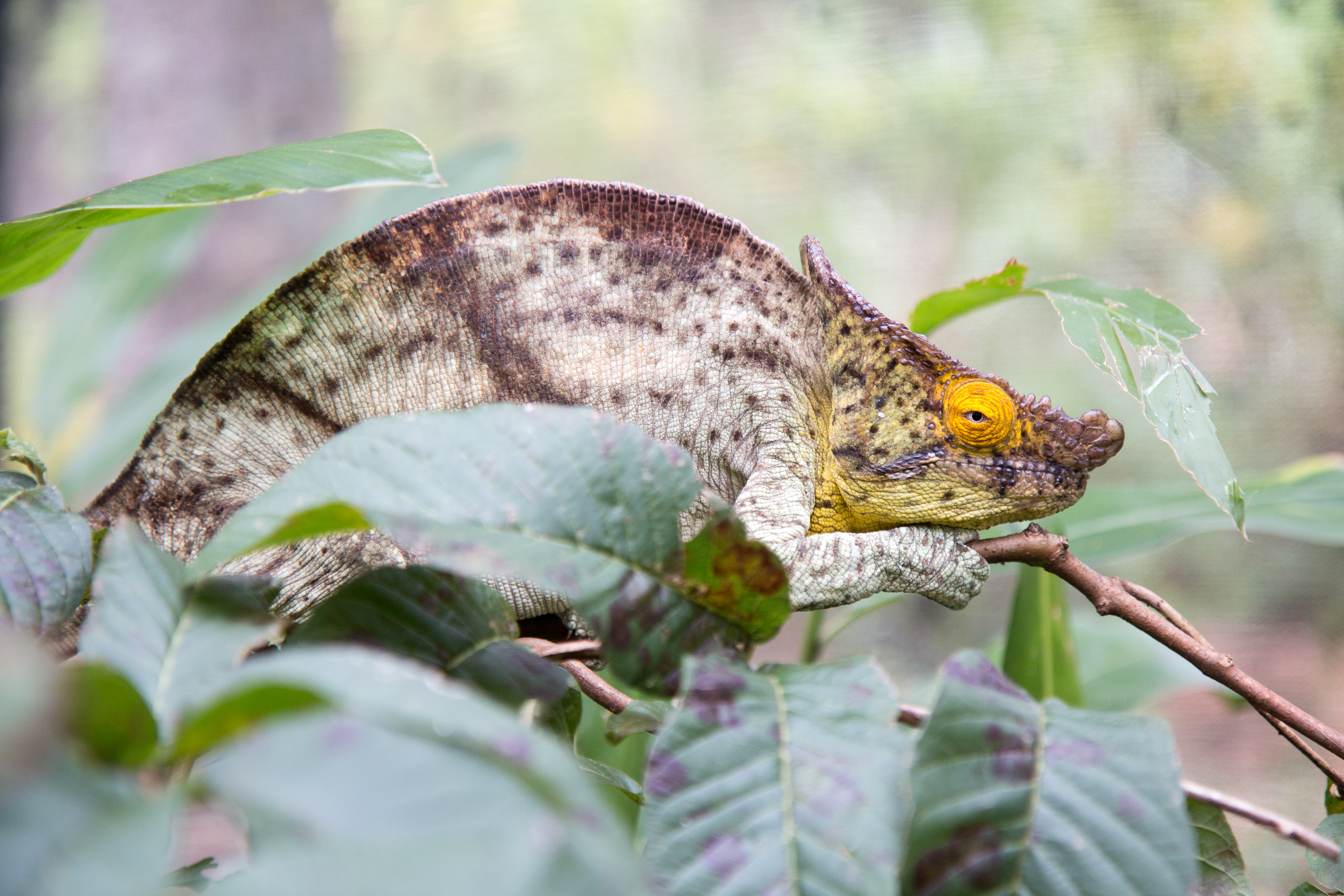
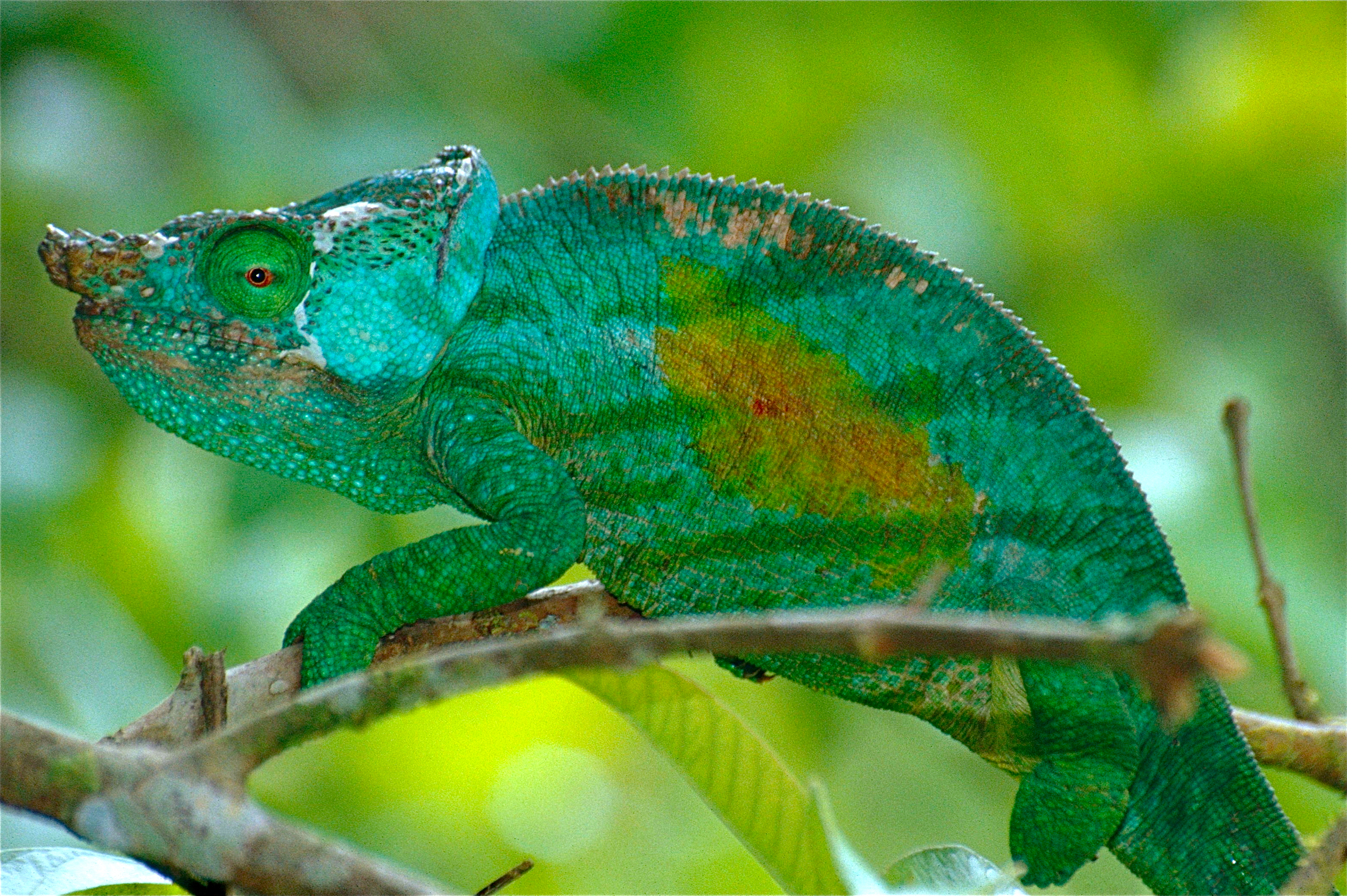
Males of "yellow lip" variant (top), "yellow giant" variant (middle) and Calumma parsonii cristifer (bottom)

Parson's chameleon is usually considered the world's largest chameleon by weight. It is also one of the longest, but it is surpassed by the Malagasy giant chameleon (Furcifer oustaleti). Adult males of Calumma parsonii usually weigh 500–700 g (18–25 oz), have a casque on the top of the head and ridges running from above the eyes to the nose, forming two warty "horns". There are two recognized subspecies:

- The widespread nominate subspecies, Calumma p. parsonii, of both lowland and mid-elevation altitudes, has no dorsal crest (no spines along the back's ridge), and reaches up to 65 cm (26 in) in total length including tail; there are reports of individuals exceeding 80 cm (31 in), but they remain unverified.
- The other subspecies is Calumma p. cristifer from mid-elevation altitudes in the Andasibe area, which has a small dorsal crest (small spines along the back's ridge), weighs less, and generally reaches up to 50 cm (20 in) in total length, although there are reports of individuals up to 60 cm (24 in).

Four main color variants of the males are usually included in the nominate subspecies, but it is unclear whether they are best considered morphs or should be recognized as different subspecies. At present, most consider them morphs, despite their separate distributions (in parts of the range, exact variant remains to be verified).

- The "orange eye" variant, alternatively known as "white-lipped", is found in lowlands, less than 500 m (1,600 ft) above sea level, from around Toamasina to Mananara and on the island of Nosy Boraha. Males of this variant tend to be smaller than males of the three other variants, and are mainly green or turquoise with yellow or orange eyelids and variable amounts of whitish to the head (ranging from only the edge of the mouth to most of the head, except the eyelids).
- The "yellow lip" variant is found at mid-elevation altitudes in the Ranomafana area and its males are mainly green or turquoise with a yellow edge of the mouth.
- The "yellow giant" variant is found at mid-elevation altitudes in the southern Alaotra-Mangoro region and its males are overall yellowish, especially the head (younger males may show more green and resemble "orange eye").
- The "green giant" variant is found in the Masoala area and its males are overall green or turquoise including the eyelids and edge of the mouth.

Males of C. p. cristifer do not occur in several distinct variants; they are overall green or turquoise and typically have a yellow-orange or rusty-orange blotch on their side. If stressed, males become duller or darker overall, and the dark spotting and three diagonal bars on the body become stronger.

Females of both subspecies and all variants are smaller than the males, have a smaller casque and have no or only tiny nose projections ("horns"). They are typically overall greenish, although the hue varies, and in at least C. p. cristifer females can also be overall brownish and may have a light spot on their side. If stressed, females tend to show some yellow; at a peak they can be mostly yellow with green spots. Juveniles of both sexes are very similar and can be overall brown, orangish or green. Regardless of age and sex, Parson's chameleons become paler when they sleep during the night, which is typical of chameleons in general.

== Diet ==
Parson's chameleon mainly feeds on invertebrates, especially insects, but it is opportunistic and sometimes also takes small vertebrates like lizards and small birds. The species is a sit-and-wait predator that tends to be slow-moving and quite inactive (more active during the breeding season). There are unverified reports of occasional feeding on plant material like leaves, flowers and pollen, which would be unusual for a chameleon but not unique. Among others, plant material has been confirmed from the diet of the Malagasy giant chameleon, the Namaqua chameleon (Chamaeleo namaquensis), and the veiled chameleon (Chamaeleo calyptratus).

== Life cycle ==
=== Reproduction ===
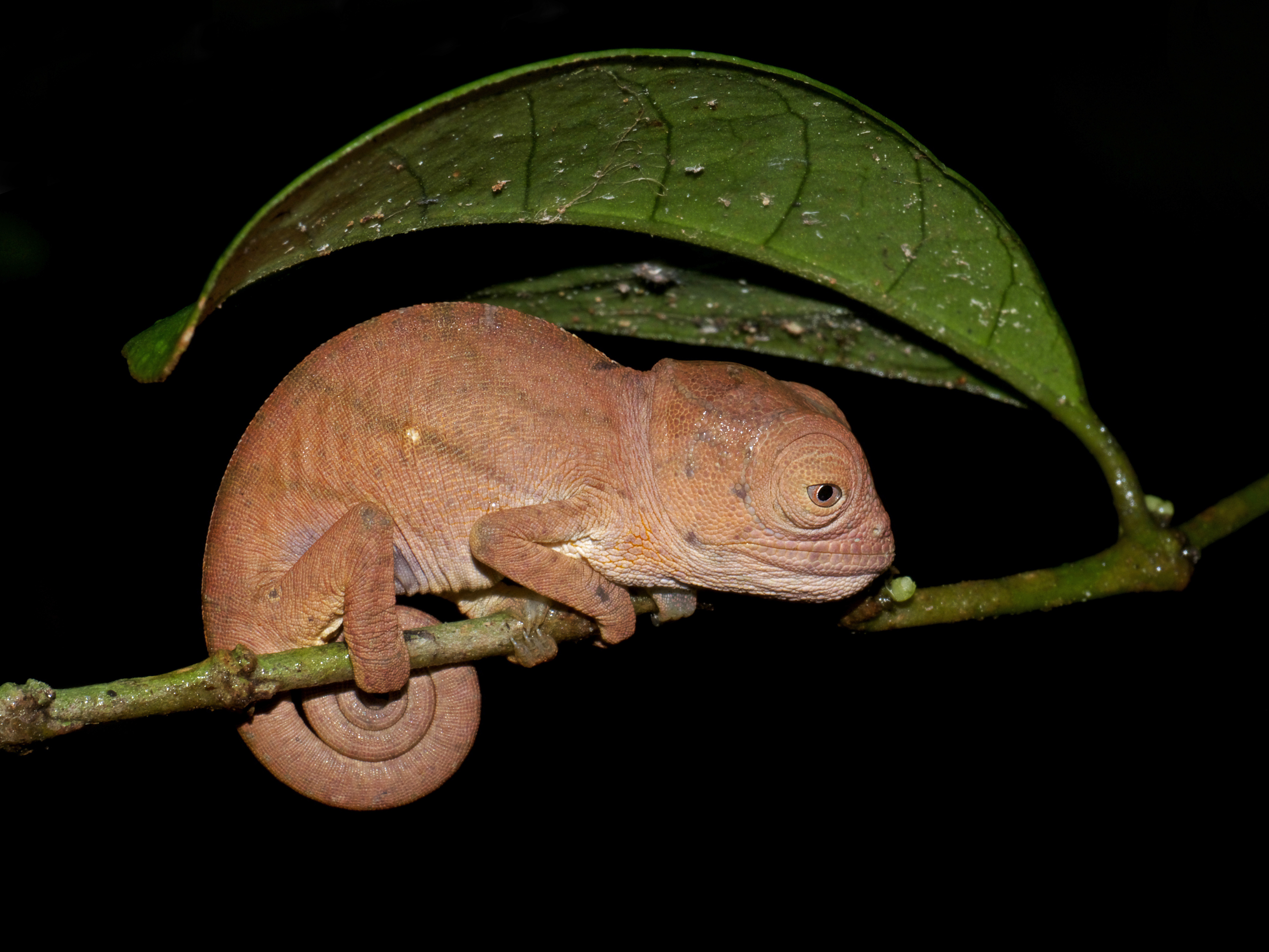
Juvenile Calumma parsonii

Breeding in Parson's chameleon is seasonal, with mating at the start of the rainy season and the female laying a single clutch of eggs at the end of the rainy season, about three to five months later. A female can breed once per year, but often may skip a season and breed every other year instead. In one case, a female laid eggs several years in a row after having only mated once, strongly suggesting that a female can retain sperm in her oviduct for a significant period after mating and can use it for fertilizing multiple clutches (this is also known from certain other chameleons).

The female lays 20 to 60 eggs per clutch, which she buries in a hole in the ground at a depth of about 30 cm (12 in). The eggs usually take 400 to 660 days to hatch, which is longer than known from any other species of reptile; in one instance, a healthy juvenile hatched after 781 days. The variations in incubation appears at least in part to be related to the weather, with warmer temperatures resulting in a shorter period than colder temperatures. Each newly hatched young is only 7–11 cm (2.8–4.3 in) in total length (tail included). After hatching, sexual maturity is reached when three years old on average, but it can happen at ages as young as two years and as old as five years.

=== Life span ===
Parson's chameleon is one of the longest-lived chameleon species. Wild males are known to have reached at least 9 years and females at least 8 years; it is estimated that its longevity in the wild is 10 to 12 years. In captivity, individuals of 14 years have been recorded, which is older than confirmed in any other species of chameleon, and it is possible that some Parson's chameleons might be able to reach as much as 20 years.

== Conservation ==
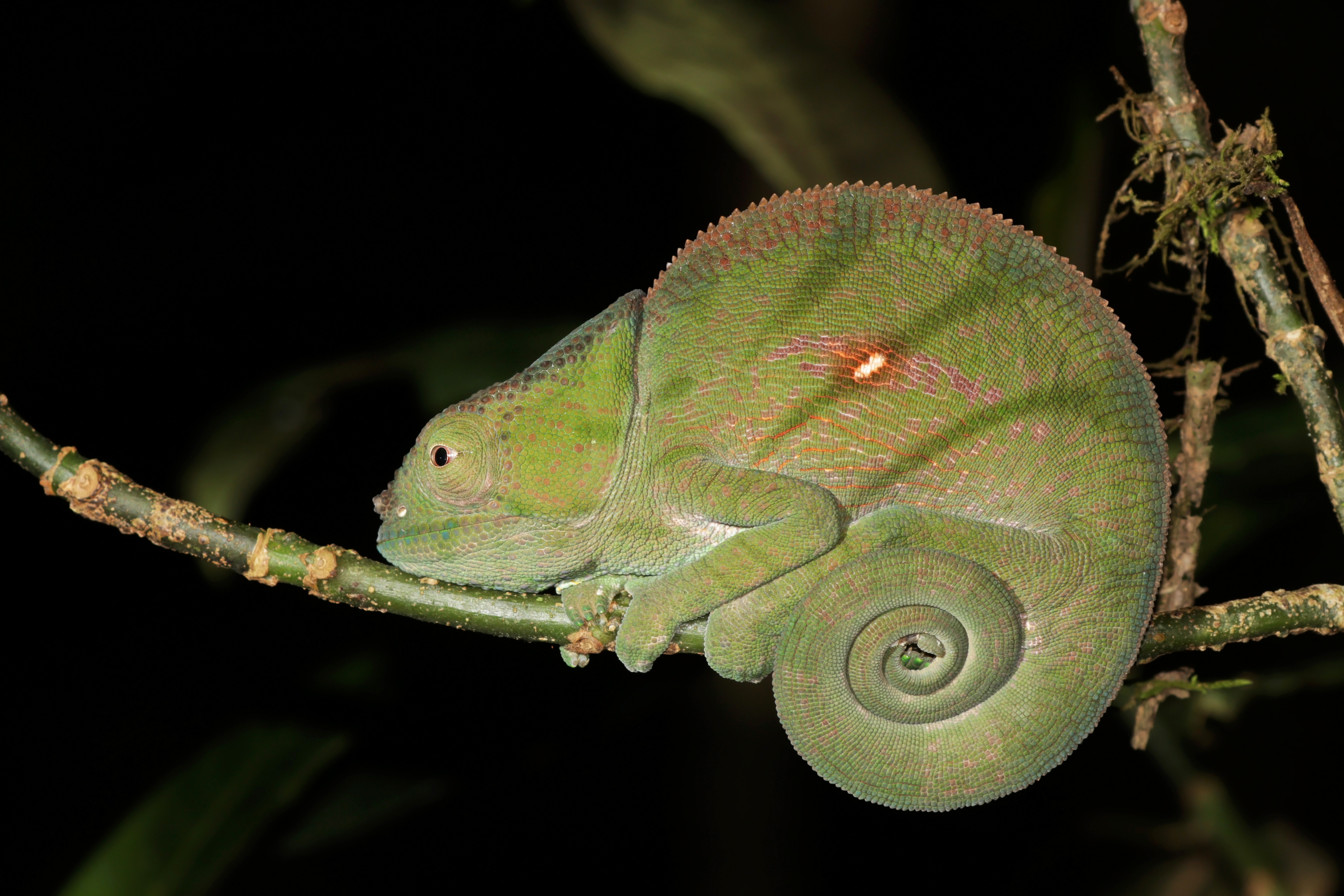
A female Calumma parsonii cristifer in the Andasibe-Mantadia National Park

Parson's chameleon is considered near threatened by the IUCN. It has a large range covering almost 40,000 km^{2} (15,000 sq mi) and inhabits several protected areas, but it appears to occur at low densities, although it possibly is partially overlooked due to preference for roosting high in the forest canopy.

The main threat to this species is ongoing habitat loss, especially from slash-and-burn agriculture but also logging, as it mostly is restricted to primary forest, although it also occurs in disturbed habitats, including patches of tall trees in villages and coffee plantations. A secondary threat is unregulated collection for the pet trade, as it is a slow-breeding species. Historically, it was collected at high levels, which may have impacted some populations. It has been listed on CITES Appendix II since 1995 like almost all chameleons (only exception is Brookesia perarmata on Appendix I), which means that legal international trade in the species now only can happen with a permit. Since then, legal exports from Madagascar have been restricted to a specific number each year, but in years where the quota was zero some unregulated, illegal trade is known to still have occurred.
