= James Parsons (physician) =

English physician, antiquary and author

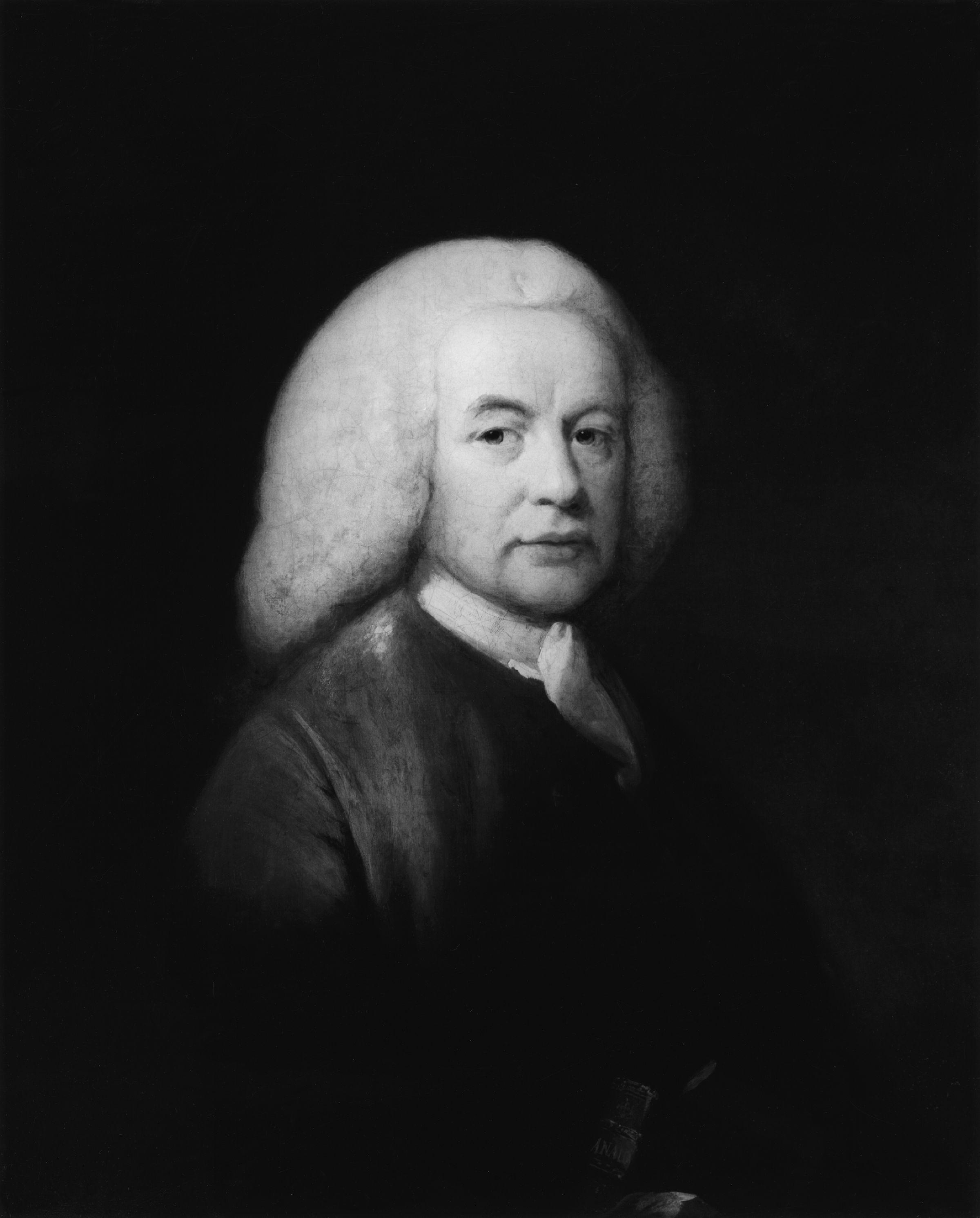
Portrait of James Parsons by Benjamin Wilson, 1762

James Parsons FRS (March 1705 – 4 April 1770) was an English physician, antiquary and author.

Born in Barnstaple, he was brought up in Ireland before going to Paris to study medicine. He received his degree from Rheims and in 1736 moved to London to study with the anatomist James Douglas.

In 1741 he was elected a Fellow of the Royal Society, and was Assistant Foreign Corresponding Secretary of the Society from about 1750.

== Life ==
He was born in March 1705 at Barnstaple, Devon. He was educated in Dublin, his father having moved to Ireland on receiving the appointment of barrack-master at Bolton. He acted for a time as tutor to Lord Kingston, but later went to Paris, where he studied medicine for several years. He took the degree of doctor of medicine at Rheims on 11 June 1736. A month later he came to London with letters of introduction from Paris to Hans Sloane, Richard Mead, and Dr. James Douglas. He assisted Douglas in his anatomical studies, was through his interest appointed physician to the public infirmary of St. Giles in 1738, and began an obstetric practice. He was admitted a licentiate of the Royal College of Physicians on 1 April 1751.

For many years Parsons lived in Red Lion Square, London, and knew Martin Folkes, Mead, William Stukeley, and other fellows of the Royal and Antiquarian Societies. He was also a friend of Matthew Maty, who drew up an account of his writings on medicine and natural history. He was elected Fellow of the Royal Society on 7 May 1741, and was assistant foreign secretary of the society about 1750. He was also Fellow of the Society of Antiquaries of London, and a member of the Spalding Society and of the Society of Arts.

In his 1767 book The Remains of Japhet; being Historical Enquiries into the Affinity and Origin of the European Languages, Parsons proposed that many of the languages of Europe, Iran and India must have a common ancestor, an early version of the later Indo-European theory. He focused on the similarities in basic numerals and concluded that the languages were descended from the Biblical Japheth's offspring, who had migrated from Armenia. His book has remained obscure and was largely neglected in subsequent scholarship, and the discovery of the Indo-European language family is traditionally instead assigned to Sir William Jones.

In 1769 Parsons prepared, on account of ill-health, to retire from his profession, and in June 1769 sold his books and fossils. He died at his house in Red Lion Square on 4 April 1770. He was buried in his family vault in St Mary's Churchyard, Hendon, but, in accordance with his wishes, not until 21 April. The inscription on his tomb describes him as a student of anatomy, antiquities, language, and the fine arts.

== Works ==
In addition to contributions to the Philosophical Transactions, Parsons published:

- Prælecturi J. P. ... Elenchus Gynaicopathologicus et Obstetricarius, &c. (on the diseases of women), London, 1741.
- A Mechanical and Critical Enquiry into the Nature of Hermaphrodites, London, 1741 (against popular errors on the subject).
- A Description of the Human Urinary Bladder ... [together with] Animadversions on Lithontriptic Medicines, particularly those of Mrs. Stephens, London, 1742.
- The Croonian Lecture on Muscular Motion, London, 1745.
- The Microscopical Theatre of Seeds; being a short View of the ... Marks, Characters, Contents and ... Dimensions of ... Seeds, vol. i. (only), London, 1745.
- Human Physiognomy explained in the Croonian Lectures on Muscular Motion, London, 1747. This work contained a critique of Charles Le Brun's theory of muscle motion in the human expression, with an alternative theory influenced by William Hogarth. It was then taken up by Georges-Louis Leclerc, Comte de Buffon in his description of facial movements.
- Philosophical Observations on the Analogy between the Propagation of Animals and that of Vegetables (with Remarks on the Polypus), London, 1752.
- Remains of Japhet; being Historical Enquiries into the Affinity and Origin of the European Languages, London, 1767. ISBN 978-0-85417-732-5

In the preface to Remains of Japhet, Parsons states that he attained a tolerable knowledge of ancient Irish and Welsh.

== Family ==
Parsons married in 1739 Elizabeth Reynolds, and had by her two sons and a daughter, who died young. By his will, dated October 1766, he left his whole property to his wife, who died 8 August 1786.

== Legacy ==
Parsons is commemorated in the scientific name of a species of giant chameleon, Calumma parsonii, and a genus of plants, Parsonsia.
