= St Mary's Churchyard, Hendon =

Historic cemetery in the Borough of Barnet, London

Coordinates: 51.590977°N 0.228724°W

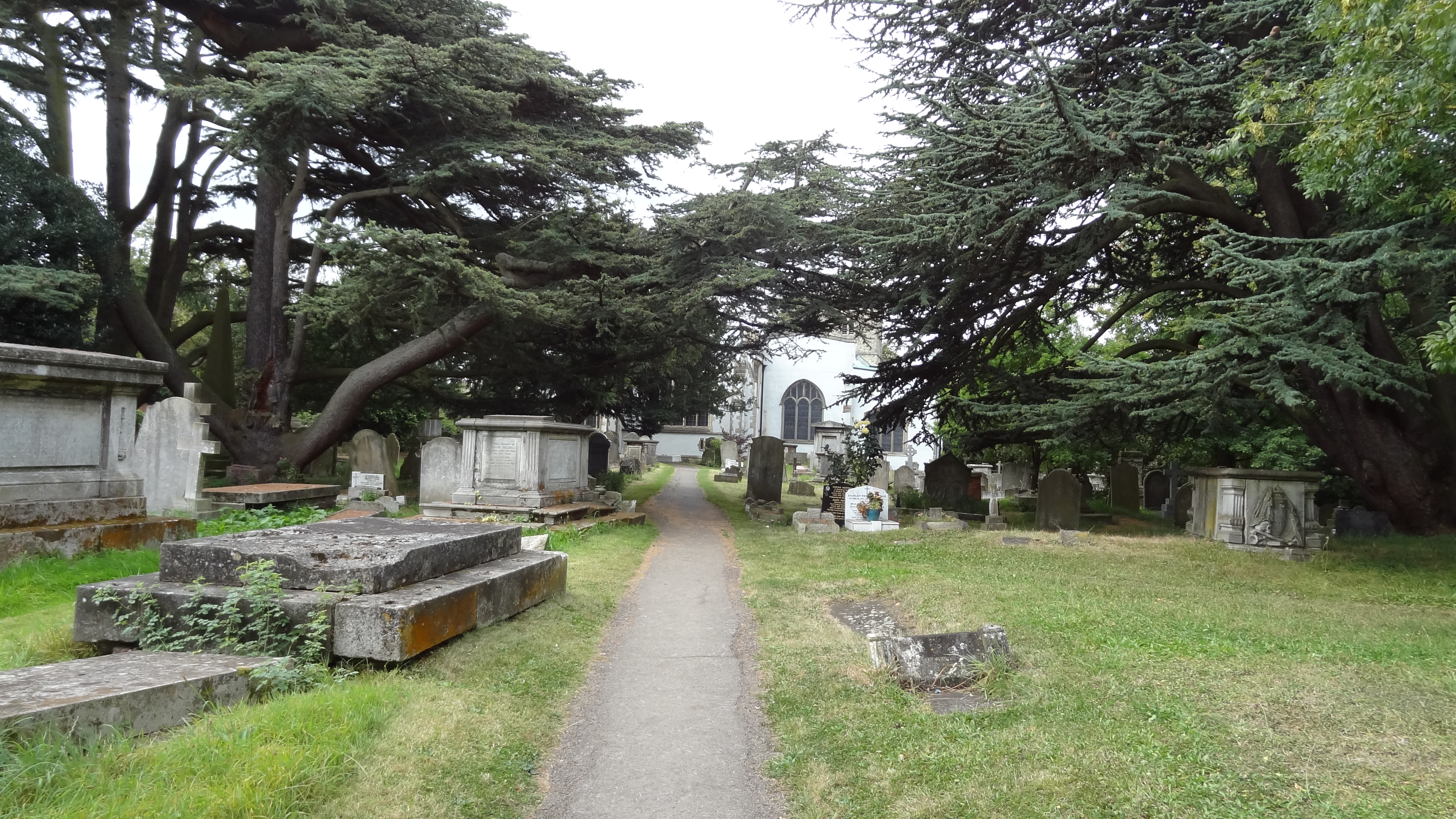
Churchyard

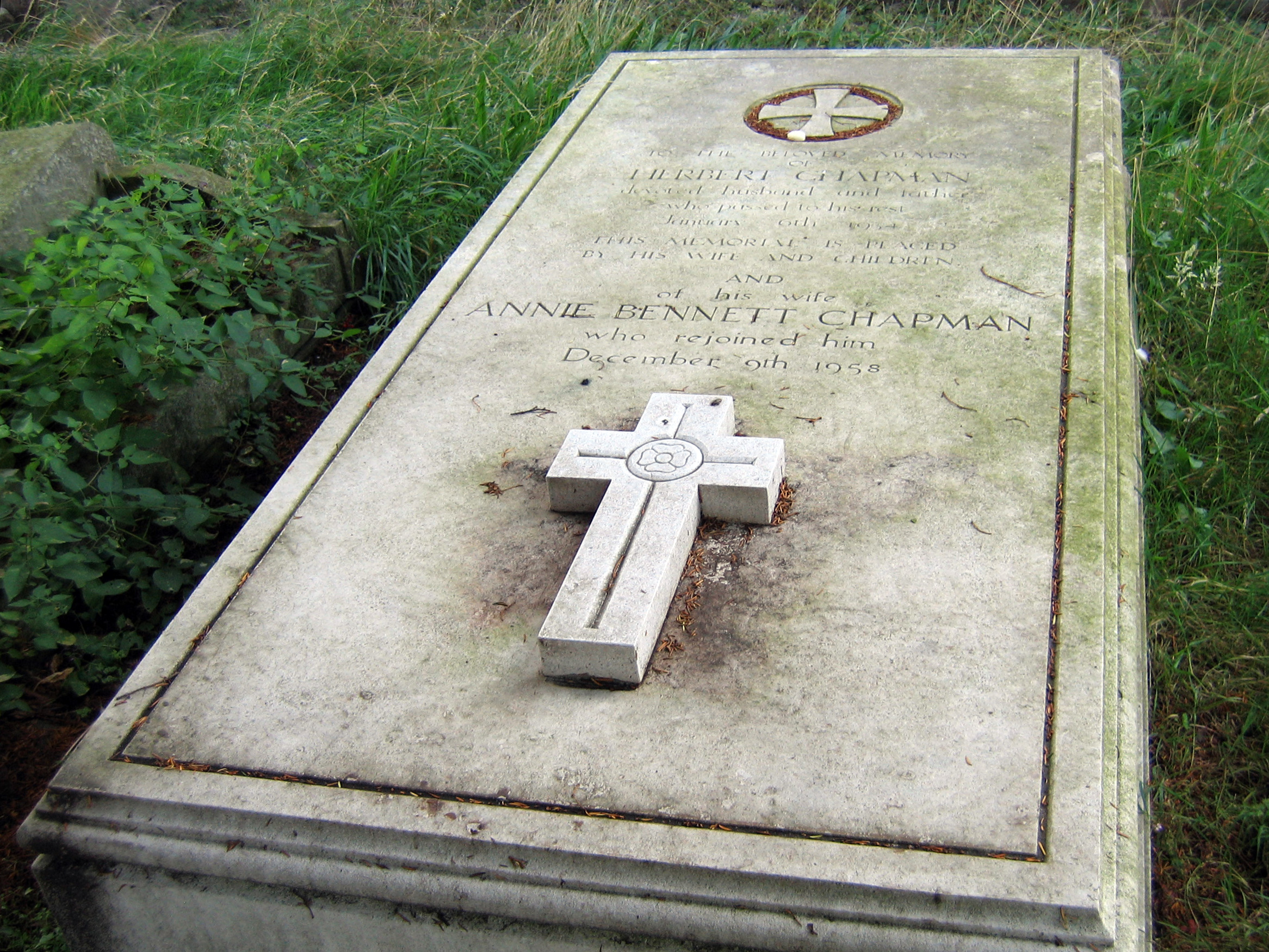
Gravestone of Arsenal Football Club manager Herbert Chapman

St Mary's Churchyard, Hendon or Hendon Churchyard is the churchyard of St Mary's Church in Hendon in the London Borough of Barnet. It adjoins Sunny Hill Park, and it is part of the Sunny Hill Park and Hendon Churchyard Site of Local Importance for Nature Conservation. The churchyard is important archaeologically, as Roman artifacts have been found on the site and there is evidence of Anglo-Saxon settlement.

A church may have existed on the site as early as the ninth century, and there is an eleventh-century font still in use in the existing building. Parts of it date back to the thirteenth century, but there were successive alterations until it was extended in 1914–15. It has a memorial to Stamford Raffles, the founder of Singapore.

The churchyard is well maintained, and it has many tombs and memorials in the grass, which is kept long in parts. There are fine cedar and yew trees. A line of headstones on either side of the path lead to the church door, and they form part of the best collection of eighteenth century headstones in London. Burials go back seven to eight hundred years, and as a result the soil contains fragments of bone. Part of it is gravelled, which is unusual in Christian graveyards. It is still open for cremation burials.

According to a history of Hendon published in 1890, the earliest surviving grave is that of Thomas Marsh dated 1624. Fine monuments include the grave of the engraver Abraham Raimbach, the physician James Parsons and Emily Augusta Patmore, writer and the wife and muse of poet Coventry Patmore. Edward Longmore, a famous 7 foot 6 inch giant, was buried there in 1777, but his body was stolen by grave robbers. A twentieth century grave (pictured right) is of Herbert Chapman, the pre-war manager of Arsenal Football Club.

There are twenty Commonwealth service personnel buried in the churchyard, eleven from World War I and nine from World War II, most of whose graves could not be located so they are commemorated by a special memorial.

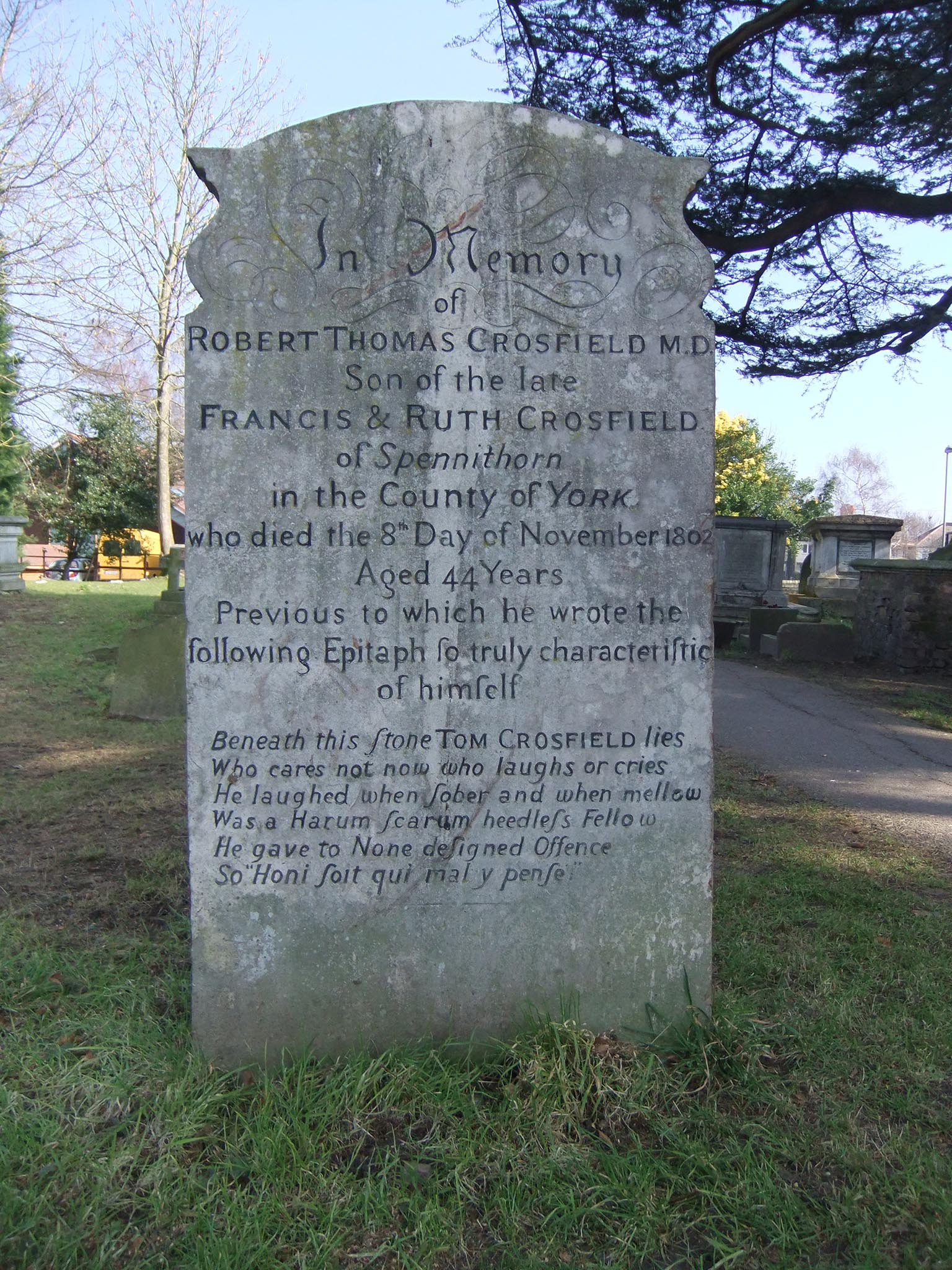
The grave of Tom Crosfield.

The churchyard also holds the burial of the medic Robert Thomas Crosfield: an alleged conspirator in the Popgun Plot against King George III. The following is inscribed on his memorial –

Beneath this stone TOM CROSFIELD lies
Who cares not now who laughs or cries
He laughed when sober and when mellow
Was a Harum scarum heedless Fellow
He gave to None designed Offence
So "Honi soit qui mal y pense".

There is access to the churchyard from Church End and Church Terrace.

== See also ==
- Barnet parks and open spaces
- Nature reserves in Barnet
