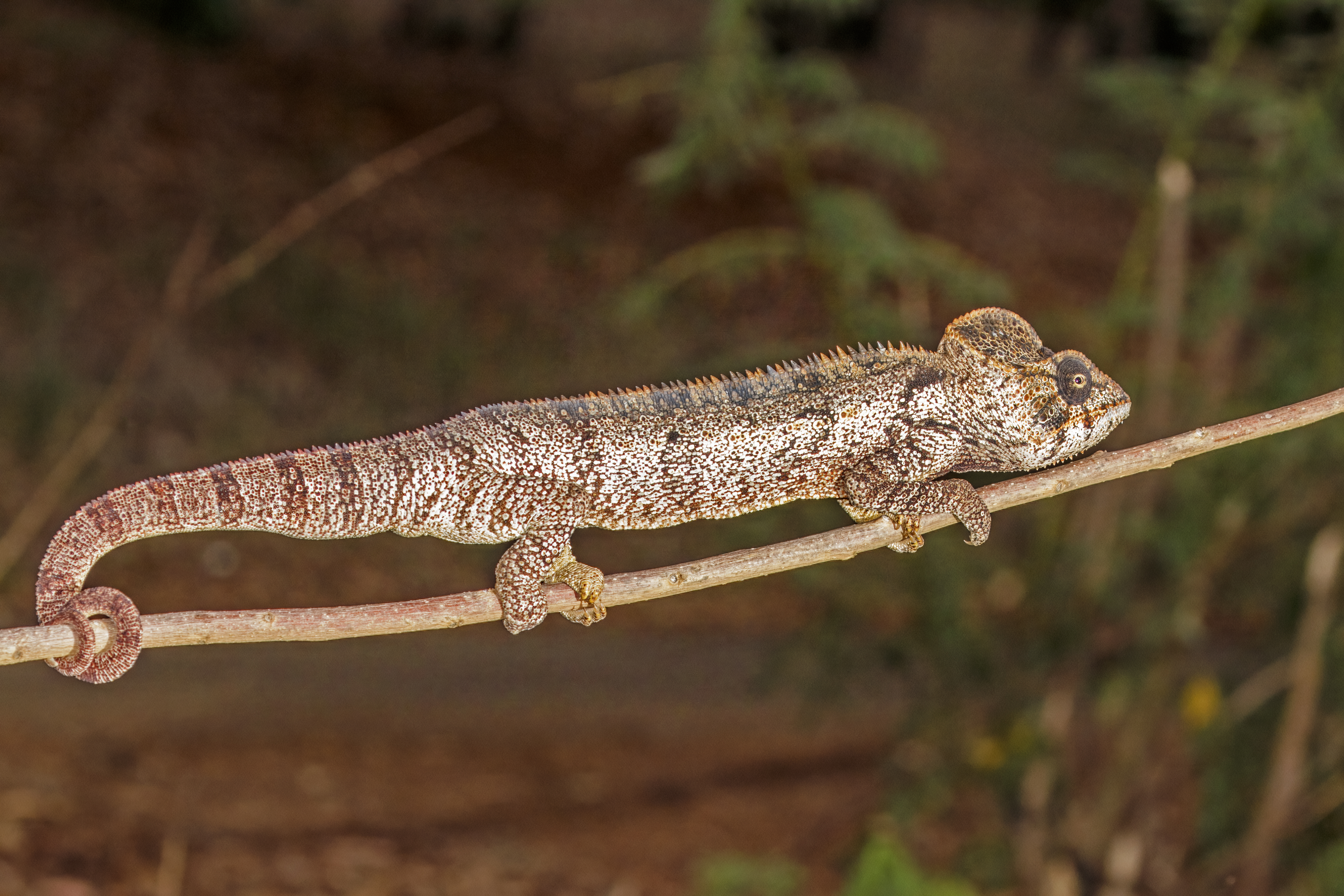
- Male, Montagne d'Ambre National Park
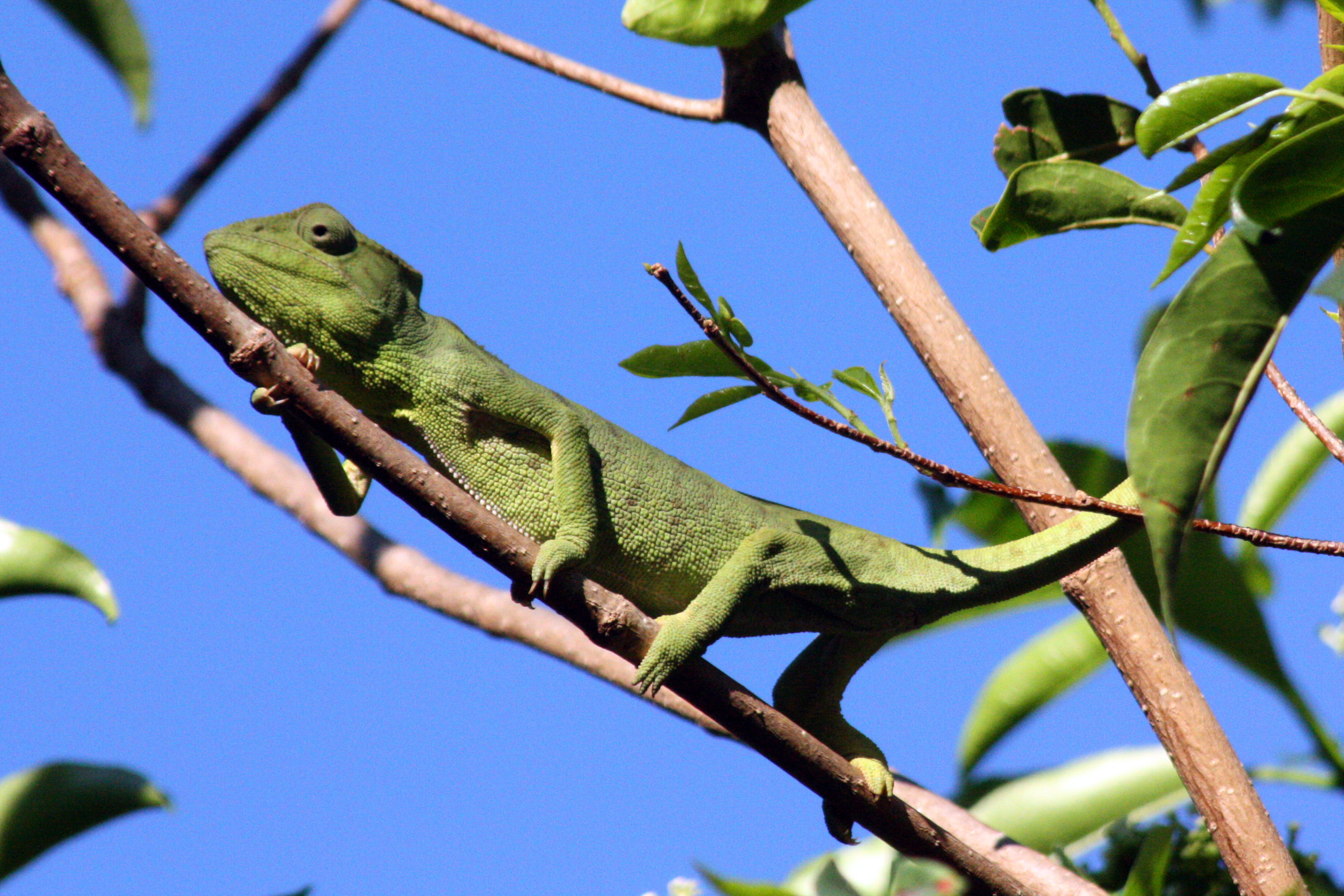
- Female, Anjajavy Forest

Conservation status
- Least Concern (IUCN 3.1)

Scientific classification
- Kingdom: Animalia
- Phylum: Chordata
- Class: Reptilia
- Order: Squamata
- Suborder: Iguania
- Family: Chamaeleonidae
- Genus: Furcifer
- Species: F. oustaleti

Binomial name
- Furcifer oustaleti (Mocquard, 1894)
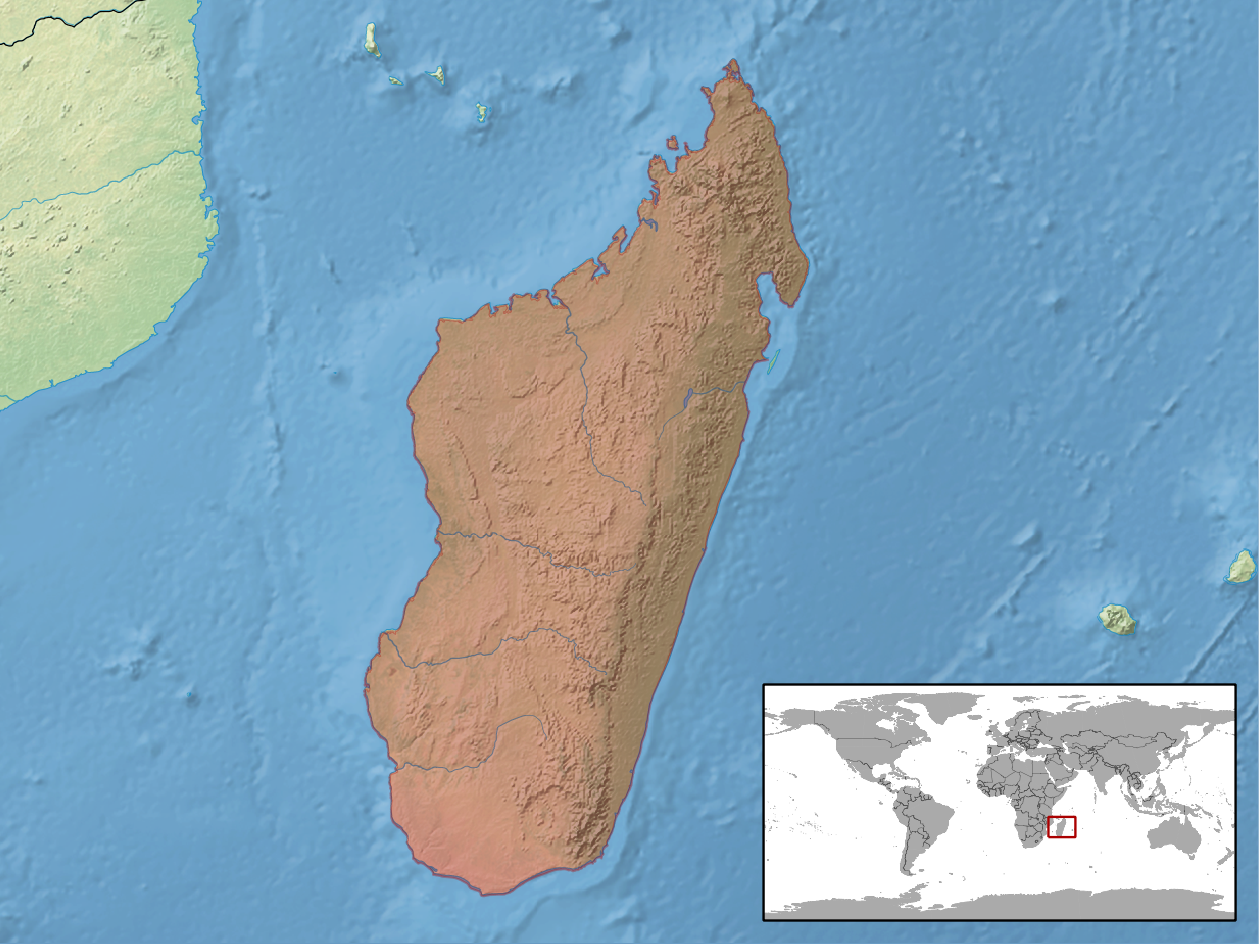

Synonyms
- Chamaeleon oustaleti Mocquard, 1894; Chamaeleo ostaleti (Mocquard, 1894)

= Malagasy giant chameleon =

Species of reptile

The Malagasy giant chameleon (Furcifer oustaleti), also known commonly as Oustalet's chameleon, is a large species of chameleon which is native throughout Madagascar, but has also been introduced near Nairobi in Kenya (though its current status there is unclear) and in Miami-Dade County in the United States. It occurs in a wide range of habitats, even among degraded vegetation within villages, but is relatively rare in the interior of primary forest.

== Distribution and habitat ==
Furcifer oustaleti is endemic to Madagascar and is found throughout the island. It inhabits a very wide range of habitats including dry deciduous forest, humid evergreen forest, montane savanna, degraded forests, agricultural areas and even urban settings. It is seldom found deep in the forest interior, preferring the forest edges instead.

== Description ==
With a maximum total length (tail included) of 68.5 cm (27 in), Furcifer oustaleti is generally considered the world's largest species of chameleon by this measurement. Exceptionally large Calumma parsonii (Parson's chameleon) and Trioceros melleri (Meller's chameleon) have been claimed to reach even greater lengths, but this remains unverified. F. oustaleti is relatively slender, and its weight is surpassed by certain other large chameleon species that are more robust, notably C. parsonii. Large adult males of F. oustaleti typically weigh 400–500 g (14–18 oz). However, lower weights are common, and females consistently weigh less. Females also remain considerably smaller than males in total length, reaching up to about 40 cm (16 in). The head bears a high casque with several crests, and a dorsal crest consisting of 45 or more small triangular spines, runs along the spine.

The colouring of F. oustaleti is quite variable. Males are usually largely grey or brownish, sometimes with reddish-orange feet or underparts. Females are more variable and often more colourful than males, with base colour or markings in red, yellow and green being possible, and the eyelids can sometimes be blue.

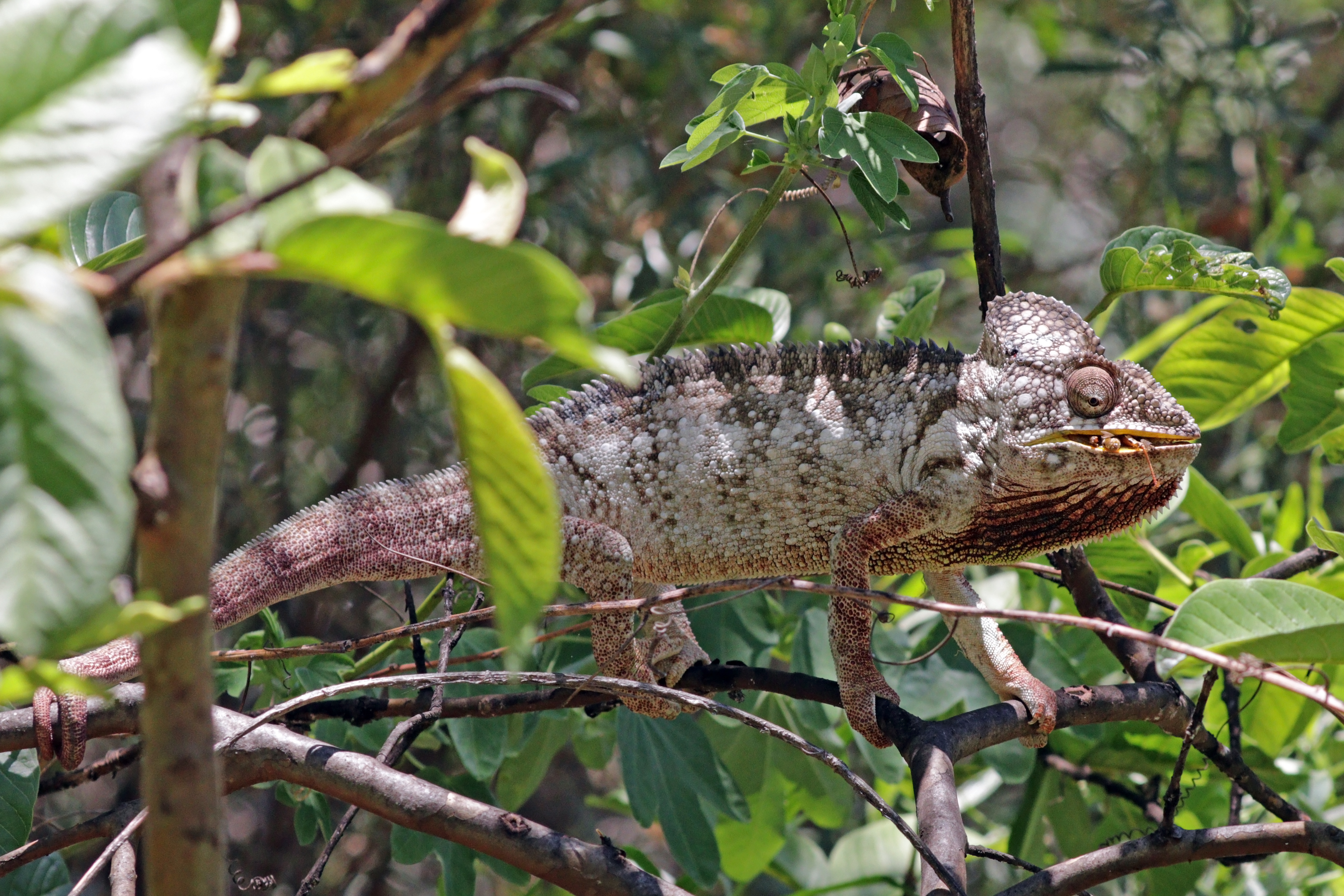
male, Anja Community Reserve

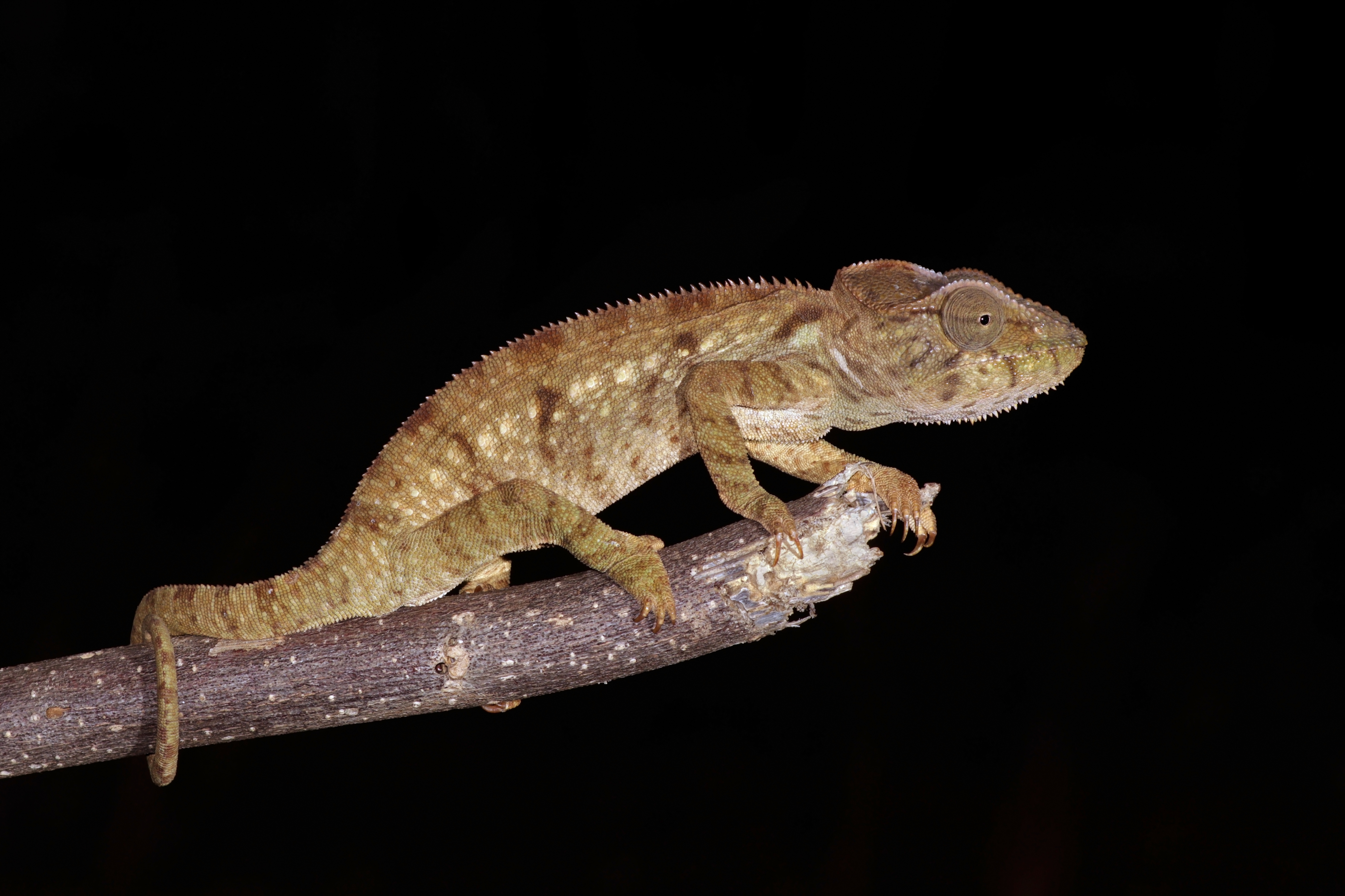
juvenile male, Montagne d'Ambre National Park

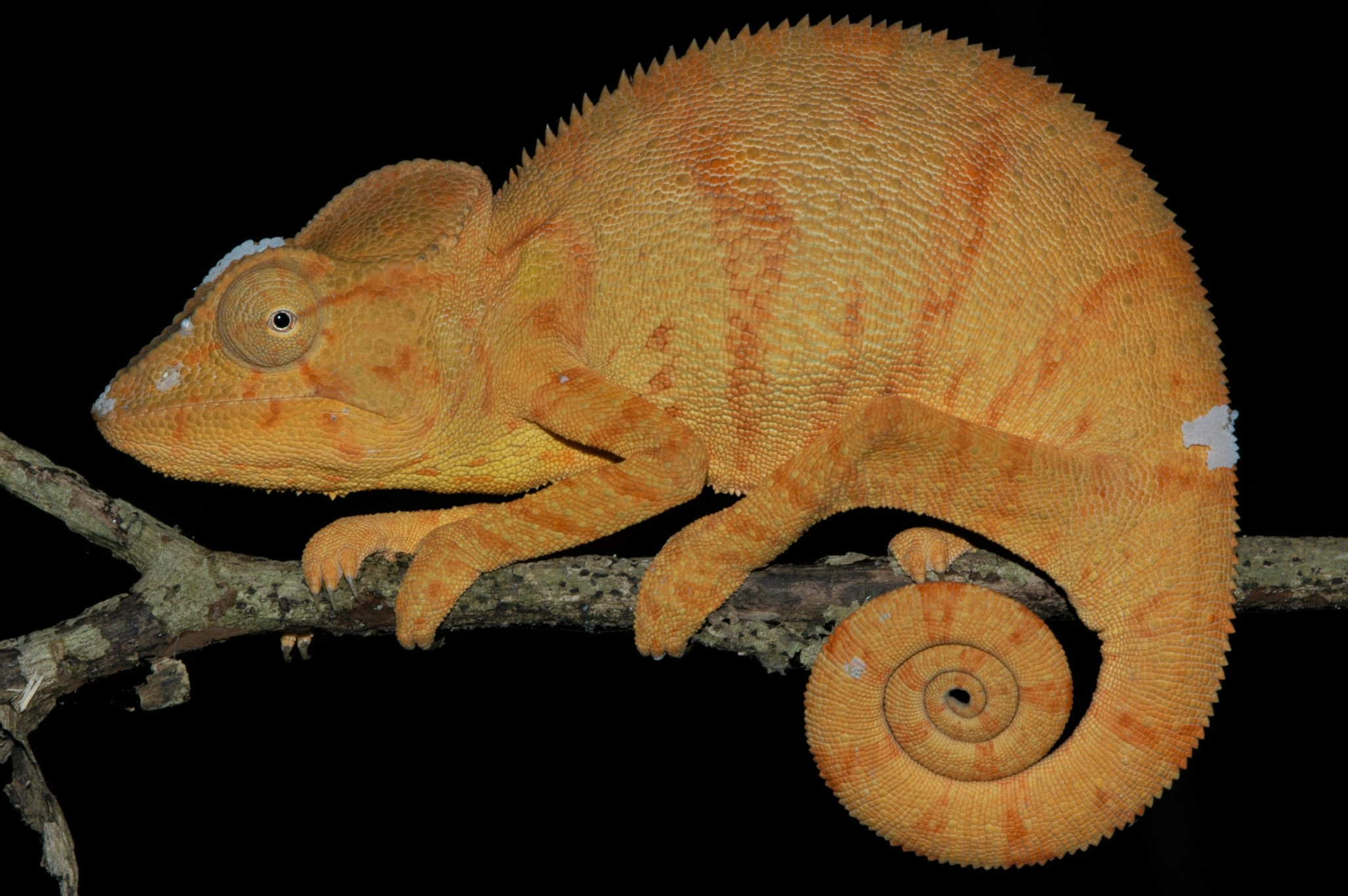
female, Ankarana Special Reserve

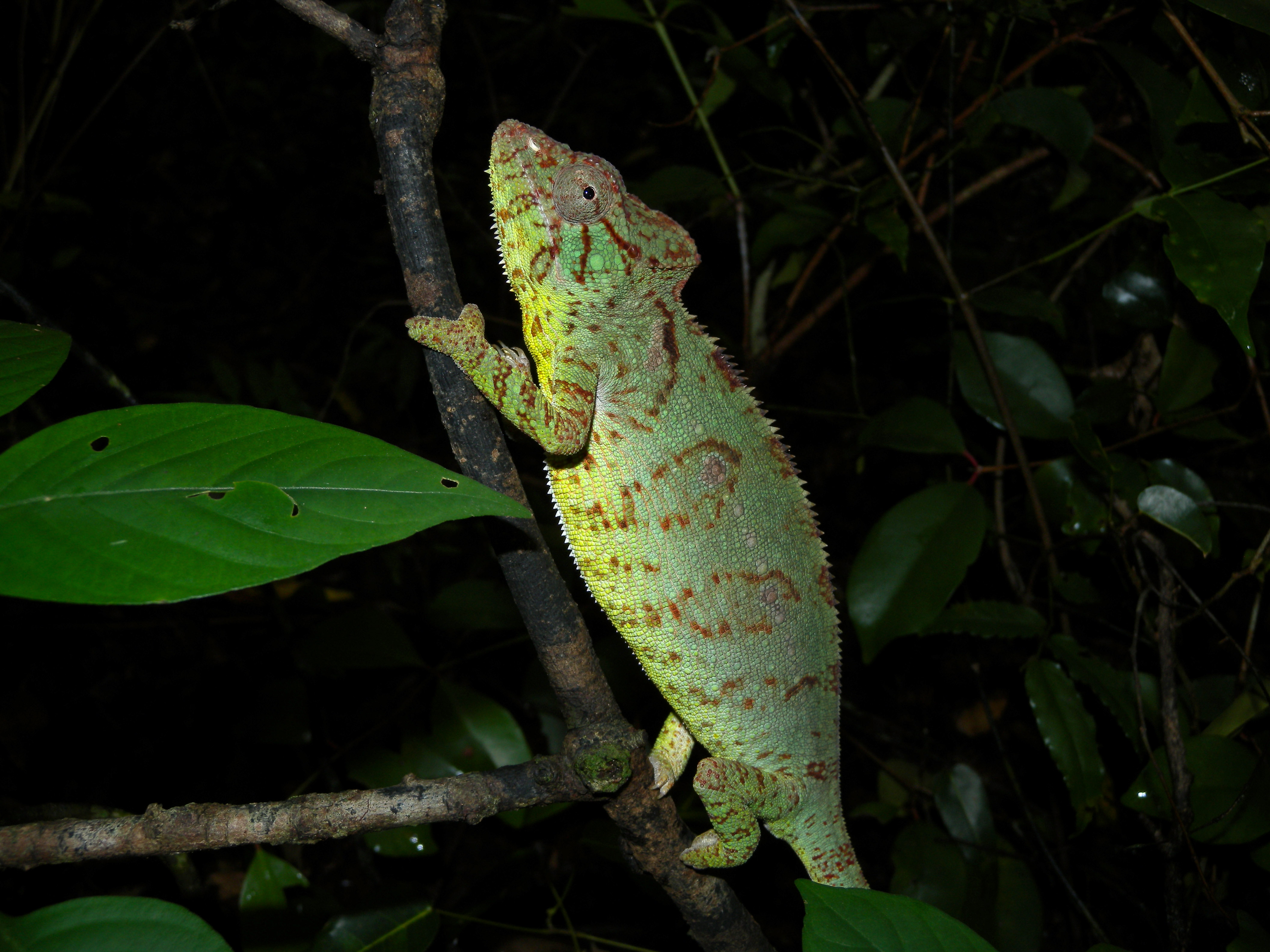
female, Ankarafantsika National Park

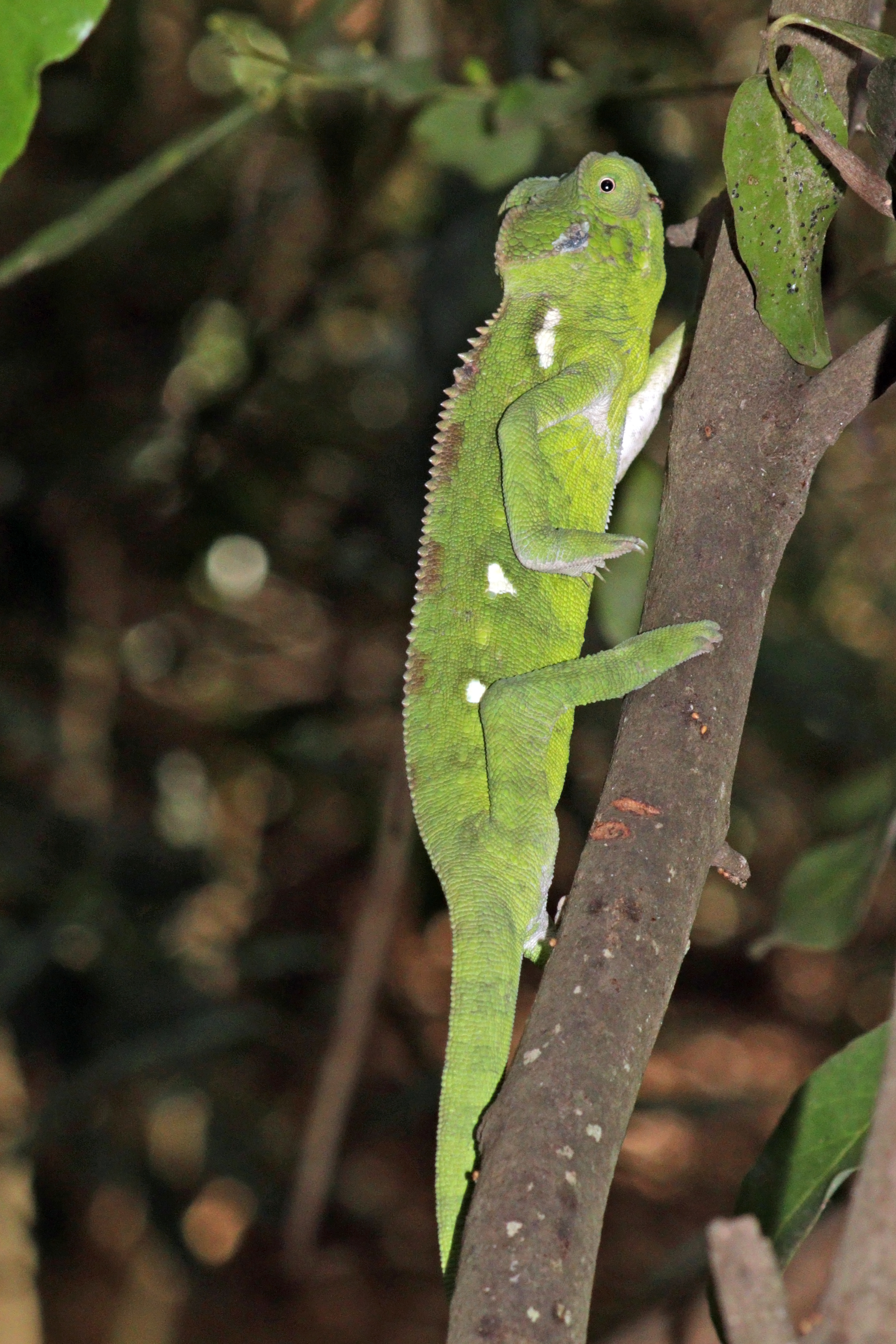
young female, Isalo National Park

== Diet ==
The diet of Furcifer oustaleti includes invertebrates such as large insects as well as some vertebrates such as small birds and reptiles. This is also one of several chameleon species that are known to consume fruit. F. oustaleti is known to regularly consume the fruit of Grangeria porosa, Chassalia princei, and Malleastrum gracile, and will do so even during the wet season, suggesting that fruit is not consumed just to obtain water. Typically, prey is acquired with the long, muscular tongue, while fruit is seized directly with the jaws, but occasional exceptions to this rule have been recorded. In one unusual case, this species was recorded grasping fruit bearing twigs with the zygodactyl feet and bringing them closer for consumption. Amongst reptiles, this level of food manipulation with the forelimbs is otherwise only documented in some species of monitor lizards and Chamaeleo namaquensis. The latter is also known to feed on plants.

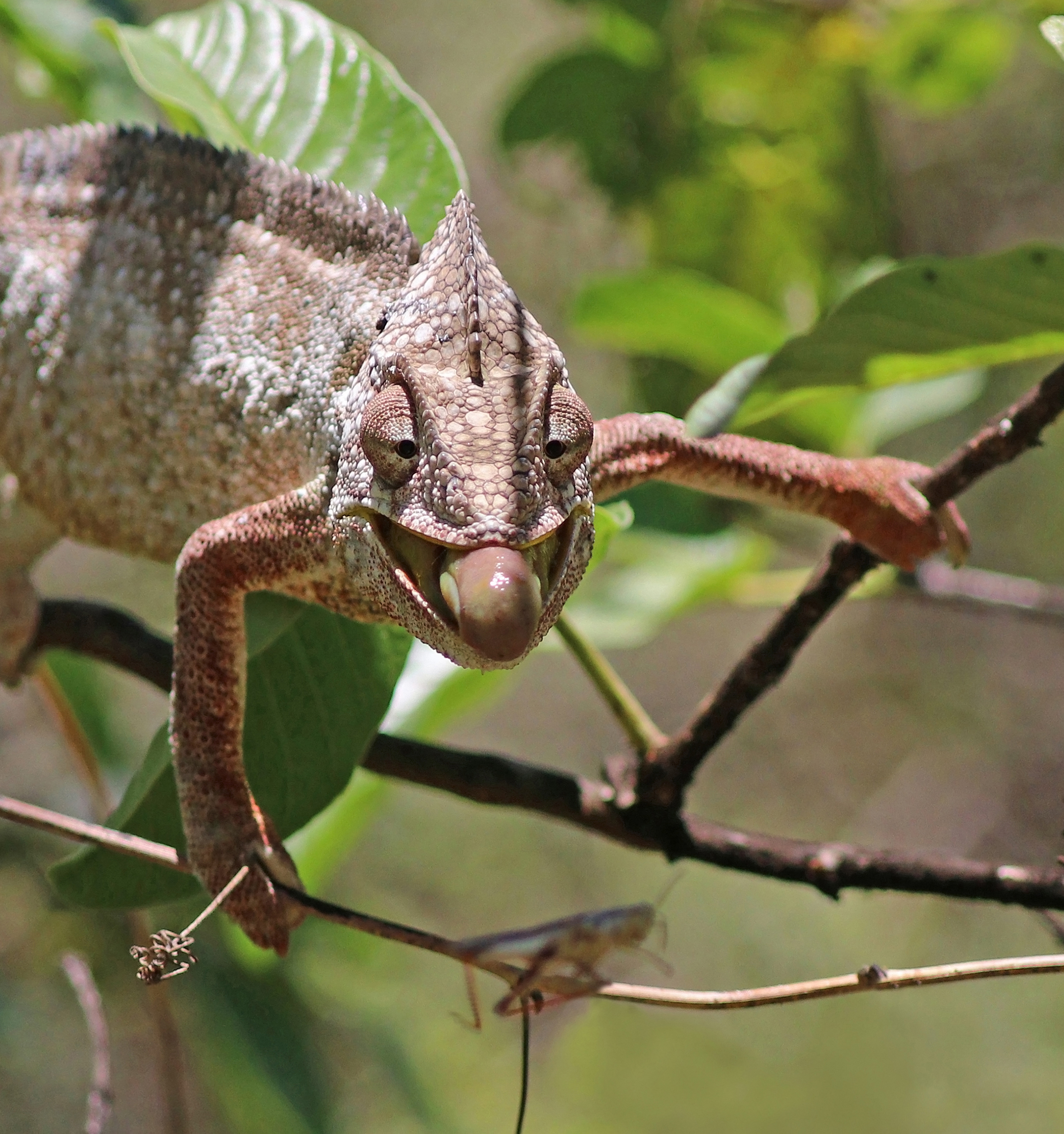
male feeding 1 of 4

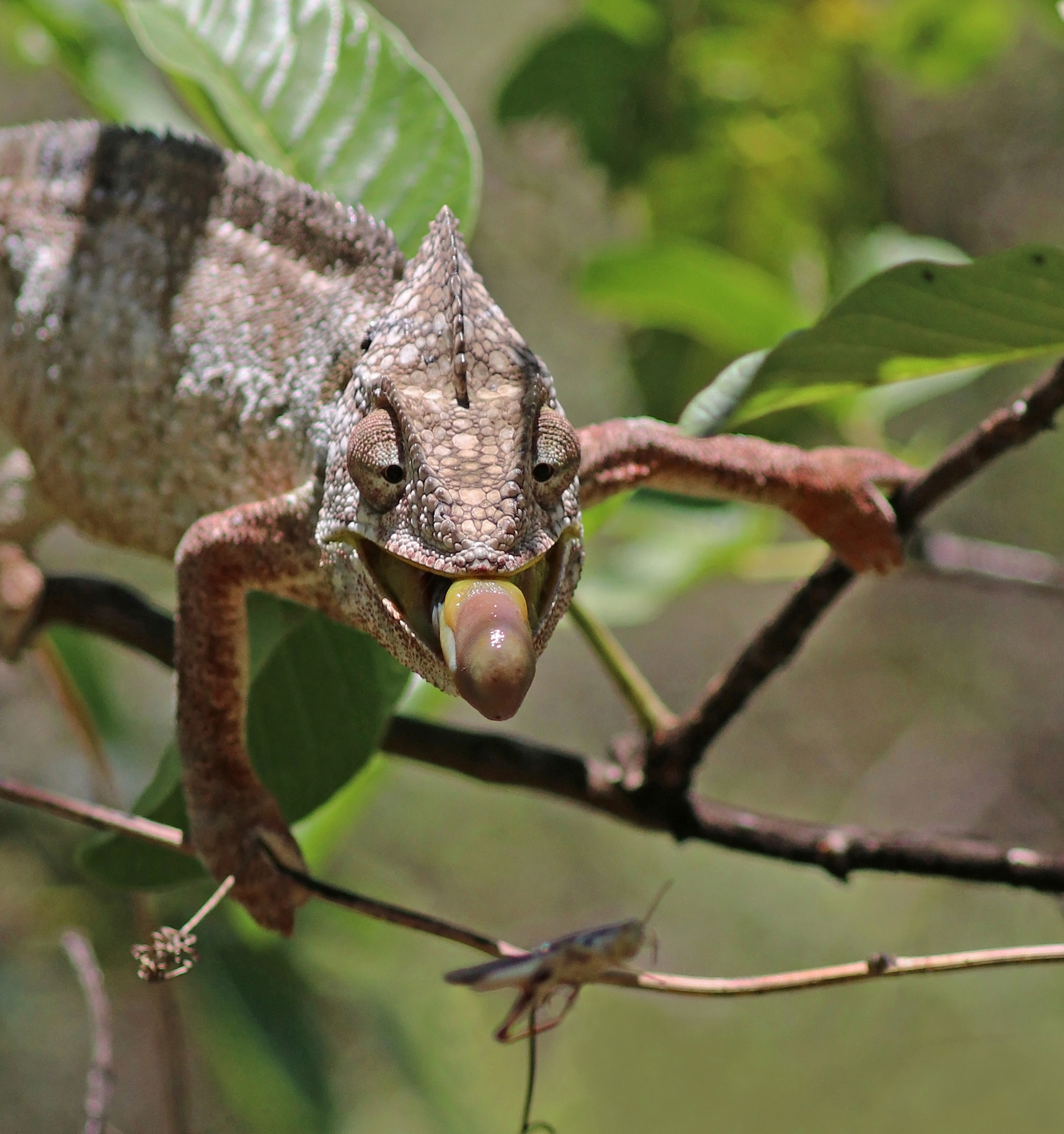
male feeding 2 of 4

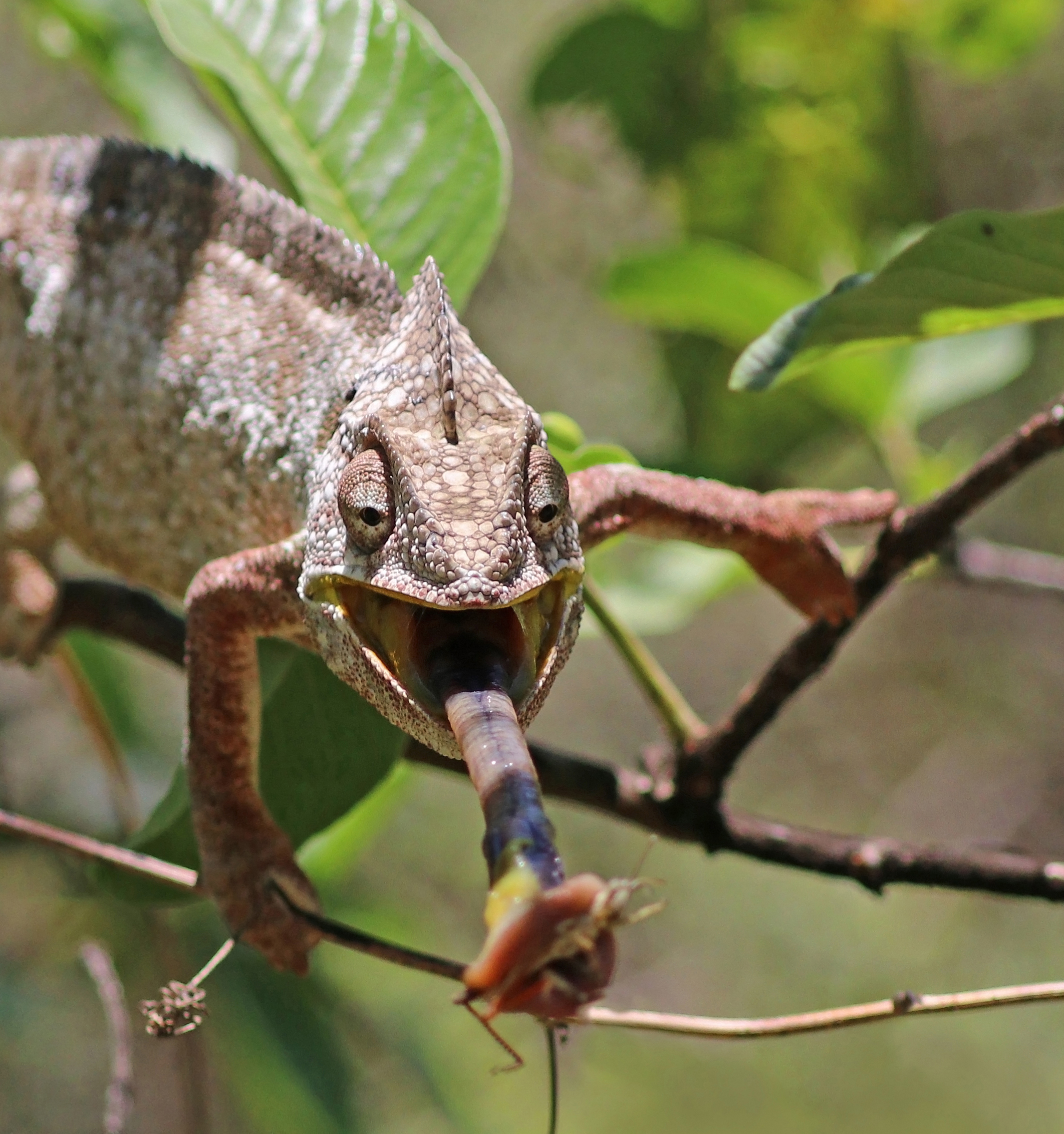
male feeding 3 of 4

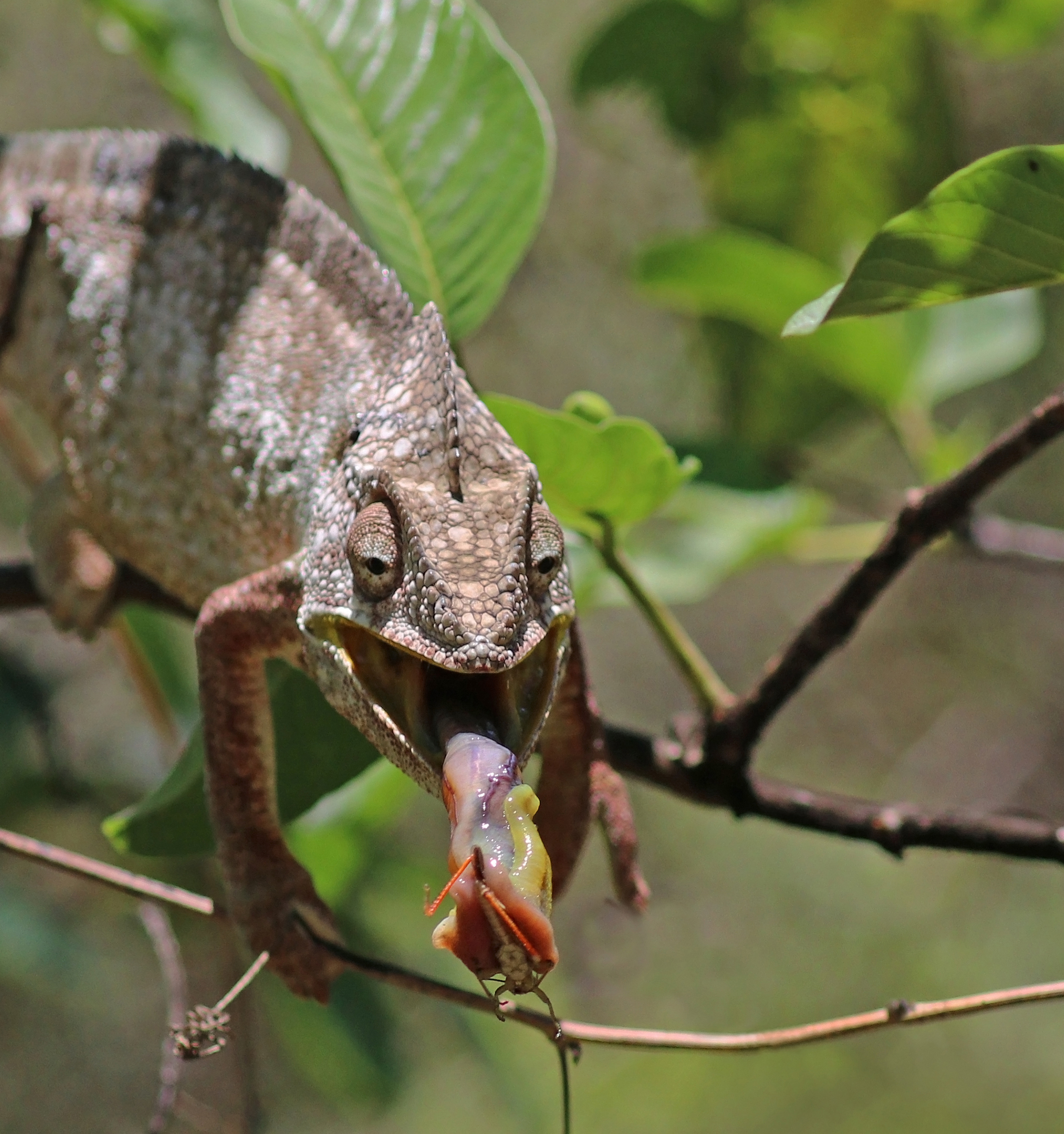
male feeding 4 of 4

== Reproduction ==
Furcifer oustaleti is oviparous.

== Taxonomy ==
Furcifer oustaleti is the only chameleon of Madagascar to occur in both the most arid regions and the wettest regions (F. lateralis formerly was considered equally widespread but has been split into several species), and a degree of geographic variation in colour and size has been observed, leading some to question whether F. oustaleti really is a single species or a species complex.

== Etymology ==
The generic name, Furcifer, is derived from the Latin root furci- meaning "forked" and refers to the shape of the animal's feet.

The specific name, oustaleti, is a Latinized form of the last name of French biologist Jean-Frédéric Émile Oustalet, in whose honor the species is named.
