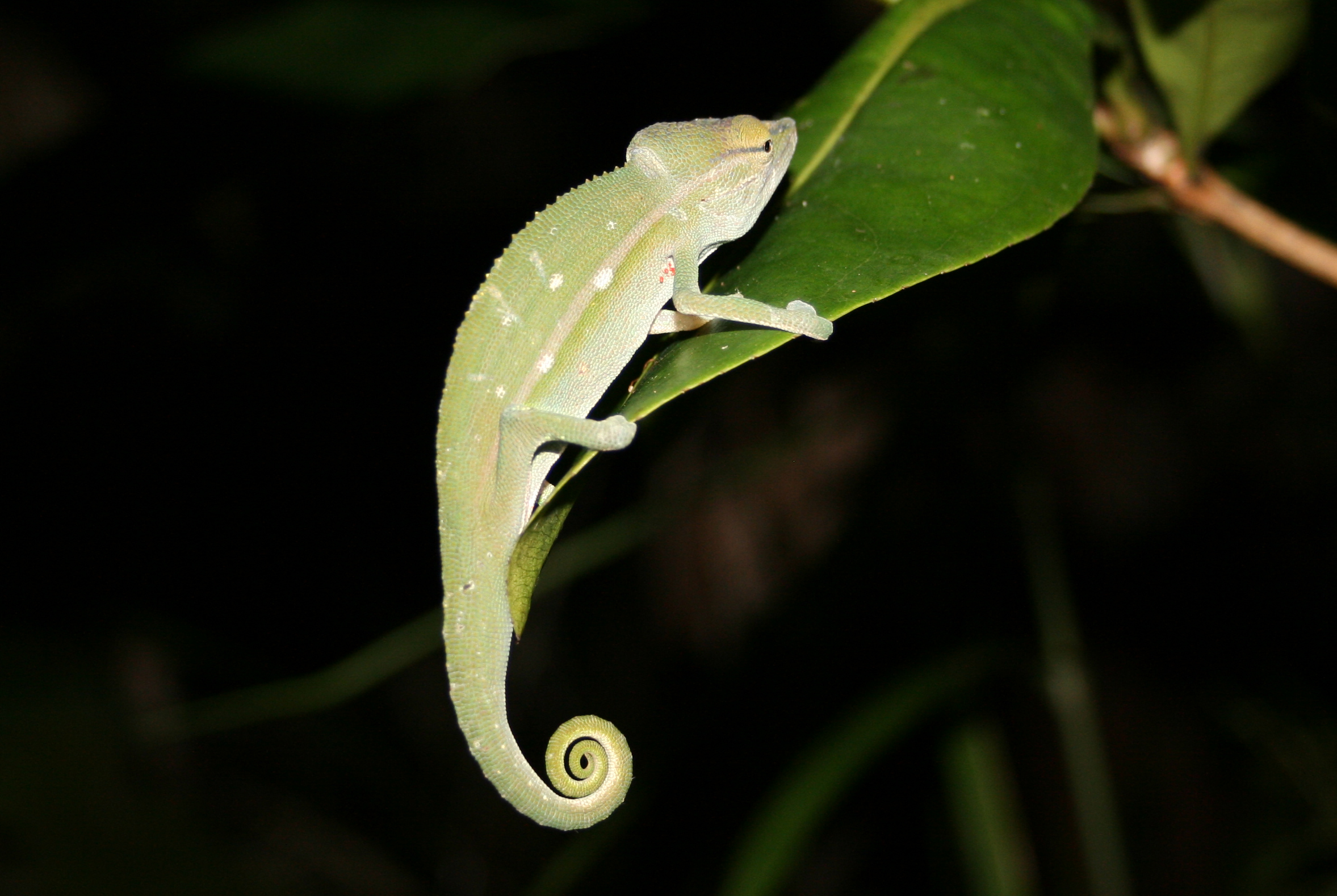
- Perinet chameleon (Calumma gastrotaenia)

Scientific classification
- Kingdom: Animalia
- Phylum: Chordata
- Class: Reptilia
- Order: Squamata
- Suborder: Iguania
- Family: Chamaeleonidae
- Subfamily: Chamaeleoninae; Klaver & Böhme, 1986

= Chamaeleoninae =

Subfamily of lizards

Chamaeleoninae is the nominotypical subfamily of chameleons (family Chamaeleonidae). The Family Chamaeleonidae was divided into two subfamilies, Brookesiinae and Chamaeleoninae, by Klaver and Böhme in 1986. Since its erection in 1986, however, the validity of this subfamily designation has been the subject of much debate, although most phylogenetic studies support the notion that the pygmy chameleons of the subfamily Brookesiinae are not a monophyletic group. While some authorities have previously preferred to use the subfamilial classification on the basis of the absence of evidence principal, these authorities later abandoned this subfamilial division, no longer recognizing any subfamilies with the family Chamaeleonidae. In 2015, however, Glaw reworked the subfamilial division by placing only the genera Brookesia and Palleon within the Brookesiinae subfamily, with all other genera being placed in Chamaeleoninae.

== Classification ==
The ten previously recognised genera in the subfamily are:

- Genus Archaius
- Genus Bradypodion
- Genus Calumma
- Genus Chamaeleo
- Genus Furcifer
- Genus Kinyongia
- Genus Nadzikambia
- Genus Rieppeleon
- Genus Rhampholeon
- Genus Trioceros

Trioceros was previously considered to be a subgenus of Chamaeleo, until Tilbury & Tolley (2009) raised it to full genus. Since then, two new species have been described in the genus Trioceros, by Krause & Böhme (2010), and Stipala et al. (2011). These two new species have not been published in combination with the generic name Chamaeleo, which poses a problem for the citation of these names in Wikipedia, unless Trioceros is treated as a full genus, following Tilbury & Tolley (2009).
