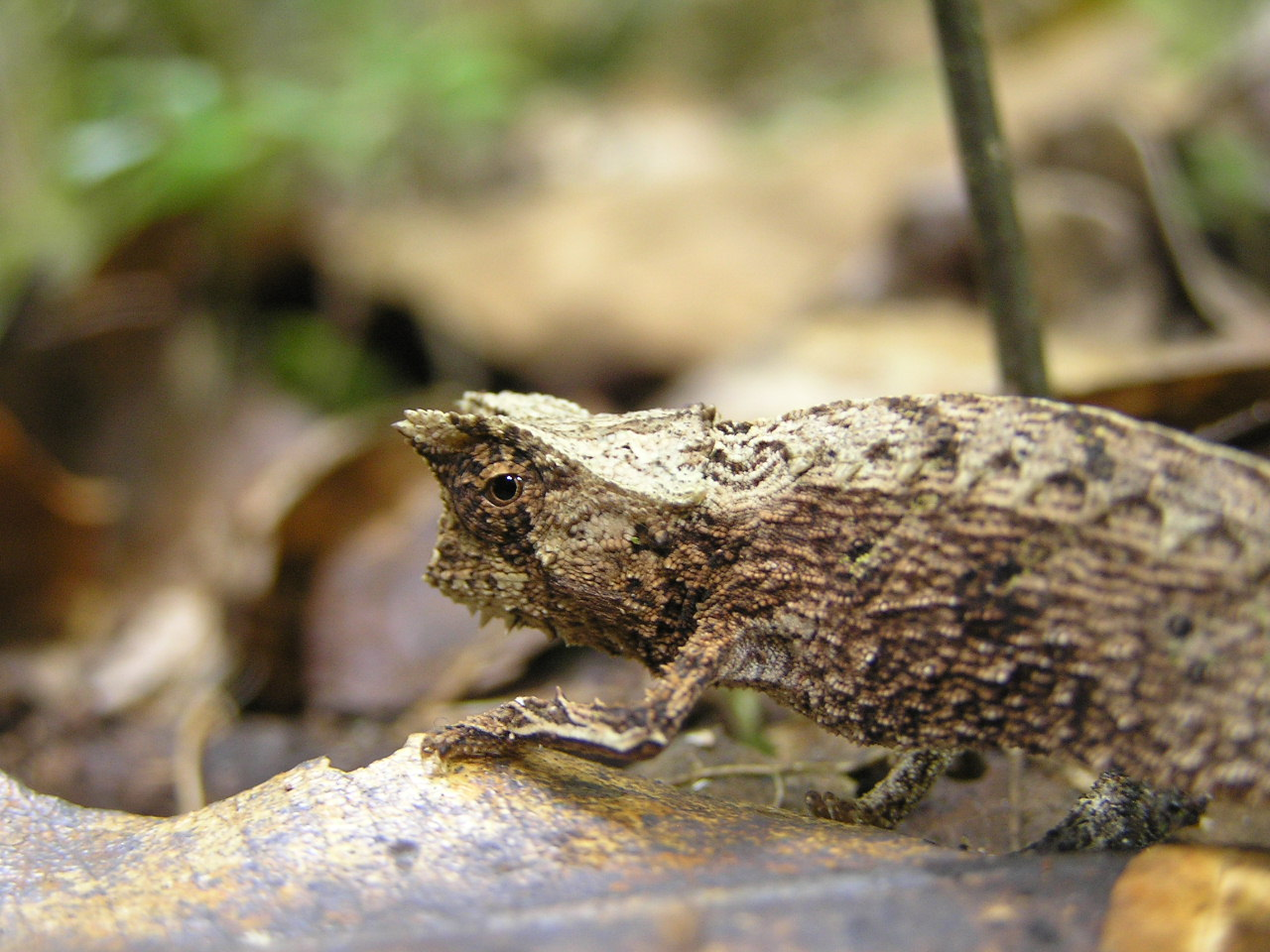
- Brookesia

Scientific classification
- Kingdom: Animalia
- Phylum: Chordata
- Class: Reptilia
- Order: Squamata
- Suborder: Iguania
- Family: Chamaeleonidae
- Subfamily: Brookesiinae; Klaver & Böhme, 1986

= Brookesiinae =

Subfamily of lizards

The Family Chamaeleonidae was divided into two subfamilies, Brookesiinae and Chamaeleoninae, by Klaver and Böhme in 1986. Under this classification, Brookesiinae included the genera Brookesia and Rhampholeon, as well as the genera later split off from them (Palleon and Rieppeleon). The Brookesiinae are small, often brown in colour, and occur in central Africa and Madagascar. They have terrestrial habits, or may be found in the lower levels of shrubs. Since its erection in 1986, however, the validity of this subfamily designation has been the subject of much debate, although most phylogenetic studies support the notion that the pygmy chameleons of the subfamily Brookesiinae are not a monophyletic group. While some authorities have previously preferred to use the subfamilial classification on the basis of the absence of evidence principal, these authorities later abandoned this subfamilial division, no longer recognizing any subfamilies with the family Chamaeleonidae. In 2015, however, Glaw reworked the subfamilial division by placing only the genera Brookesia and Palleon within the Brookesiinae subfamily, with all other genera being placed in Chamaeleoninae.

== Classification ==
The two genera currently included in the subfamily are:

Subfamily Brookesiinae

- Genus Brookesia
- Genus Palleon
