= Palleon lolontany =

Conservation status
- Near Threatened (IUCN 3.1)

Scientific classification
- Kingdom: Animalia
- Phylum: Chordata
- Class: Reptilia
- Order: Squamata
- Suborder: Iguania
- Family: Chamaeleonidae
- Genus: Palleon
- Species: P. lolontany

Binomial name
- Palleon lolontany (Raxworthy & Nussbaum, 1995)
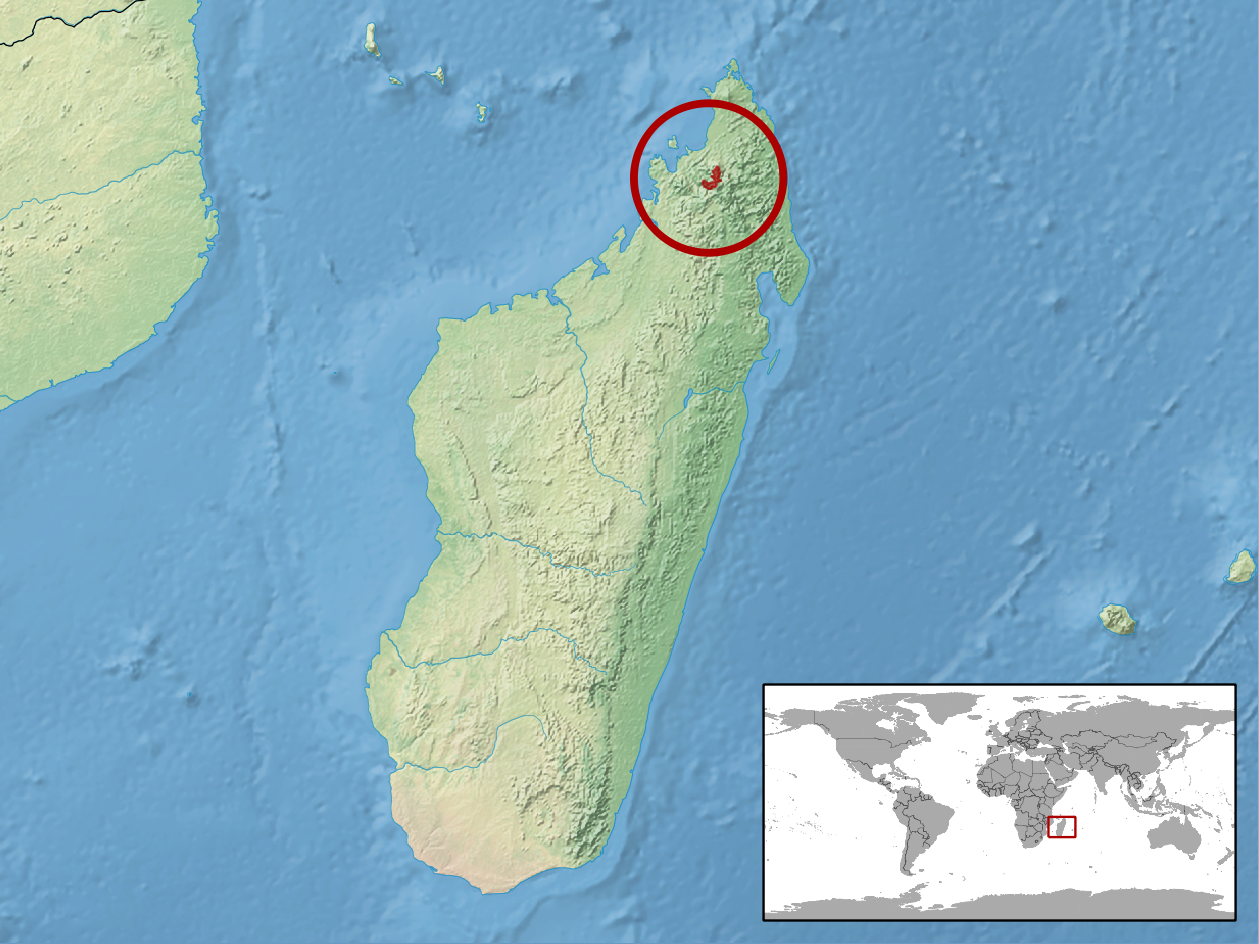

Synonyms
- Brookesia lolontany

Species of lizard

Palleon lolontany is a species of chameleon endemic to Madagascar. It was first described by Raxworthy and Nussbaum in 1995 as Brookesia lolontany. It was since placed in the genus Palleon when that genus was erected in 2013. The International Union for Conservation of Nature (IUCN) rated the species as Near Threatened.

== Distribution and habitat ==
Palleon lolontany is endemic to Mount Tsaratanana (Maromokotro), Madagascar's highest mountain, on the Tsaratanana Massif. Its type locality is Matsabory Lake and Mount Tsaratanana at 2,050 m (6,730 ft) above mean sea level. Currently, P. lolontany specimens can be found between 1,600 and 2,100 m (5,200 and 6,900 ft) in one humid Tsaratanana forest, over an area of 300 km^{2} (120 sq mi), the estimated size of suitable habitat in Tsaratanana for the species. At the most, the species can be found over an area of 468 km^{2} (181 sq mi). It is listed as Near Threatened because it is only found at most in 468 square km, and if the slash-and-burn method of agriculture were used, the species would continue to decline in number, making the list of an endangered species. The species is also at risk from logging, although it is up to 2100 m above sea level. Currently, the population is stable.

== Taxonomy ==
Palleon lolontany was described in 1995 by Raxworthy and Nussbaum but was reclassified as a species in the genus Palleon in 2013.
