= Amastra variegata =

Scientific classification
- Kingdom: Animalia
- Phylum: Mollusca
- Class: Gastropoda
- Order: Stylommatophora
- Family: Amastridae
- Genus: Amastra
- Species: A. variegata

Binomial name
- Amastra variegata (Pfeiffer, 1849)

Species of mollusc

Amastra variegata is a terrestrial snail species belonging to the family Amastridae. As with other extant amastrids, this species is one of the rarest mollusks in the world but is not protected by the Endangered Species Act.

== Description ==
The shell of Amastra variegata is reddish-brown with darker variegated bands, hence the specific epithet "variegata". Its body is translucent brown.

== Distribution and habitat ==
Amastra variegata is endemic to Oahu, Hawaii, found in the Wai‘anae Mountains. It was believed to be extinct, as with most other amastrids, until quite recently, when a population was rediscovered at the bottom of a steep gulch in northern Wai'anae.

== Threats ==
This species is not federally or state listed as endangered, but it is listed as critically endangered on the IUCN Red List. The main threats to this species are predation by introduced Euglandina rosea, rats and Jackson's chameleons.

== Diet ==
Amastra variegata is a detritivore, feeding on dead and decaying native plants.
