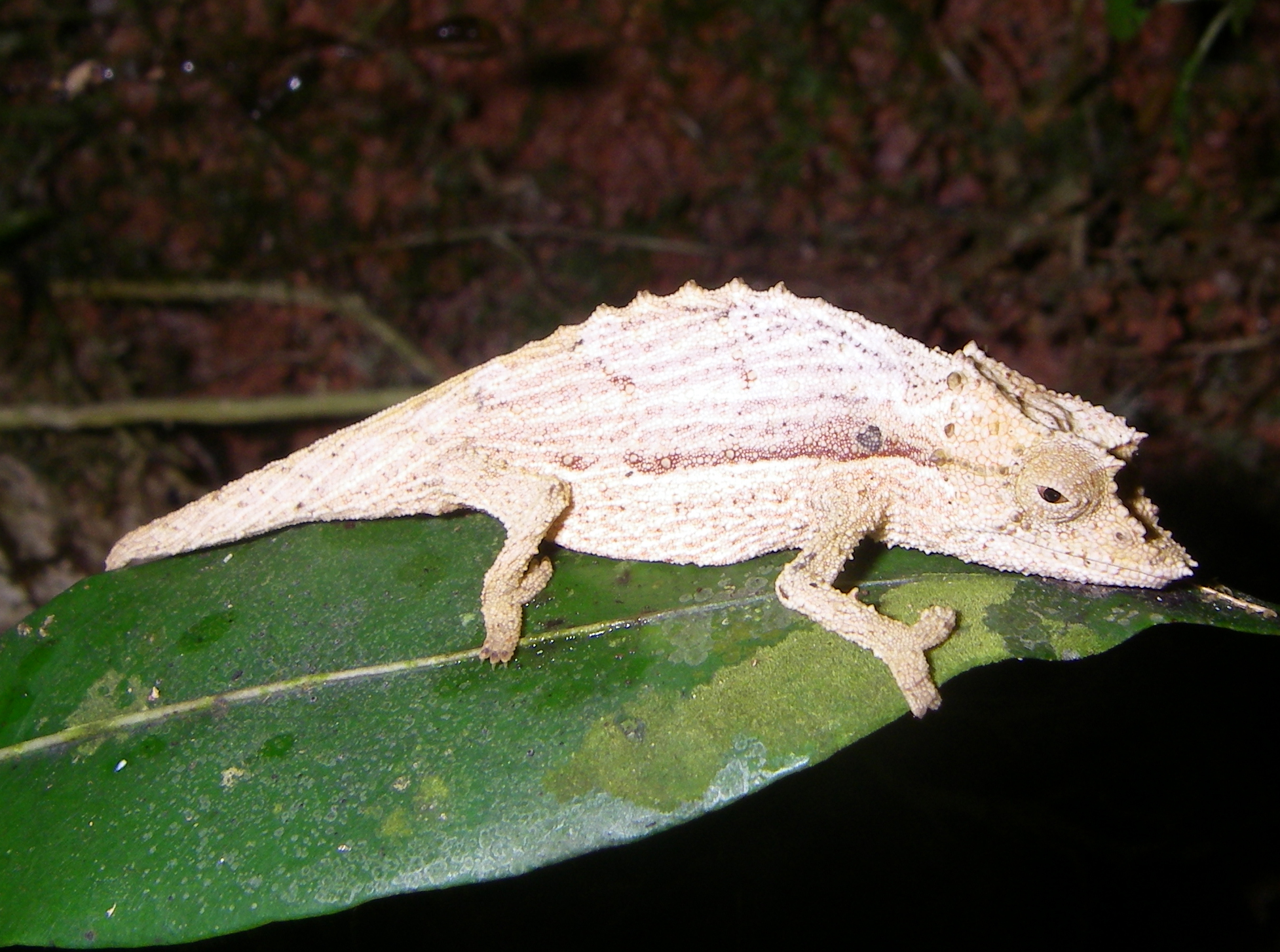
- Palleon nasus

Conservation status
- Vulnerable (IUCN 3.1)

Scientific classification
- Kingdom: Animalia
- Phylum: Chordata
- Class: Reptilia
- Order: Squamata
- Suborder: Iguania
- Family: Chamaeleonidae
- Genus: Palleon
- Species: P. nasus

Binomial name
- Palleon nasus Boulenger, 1887
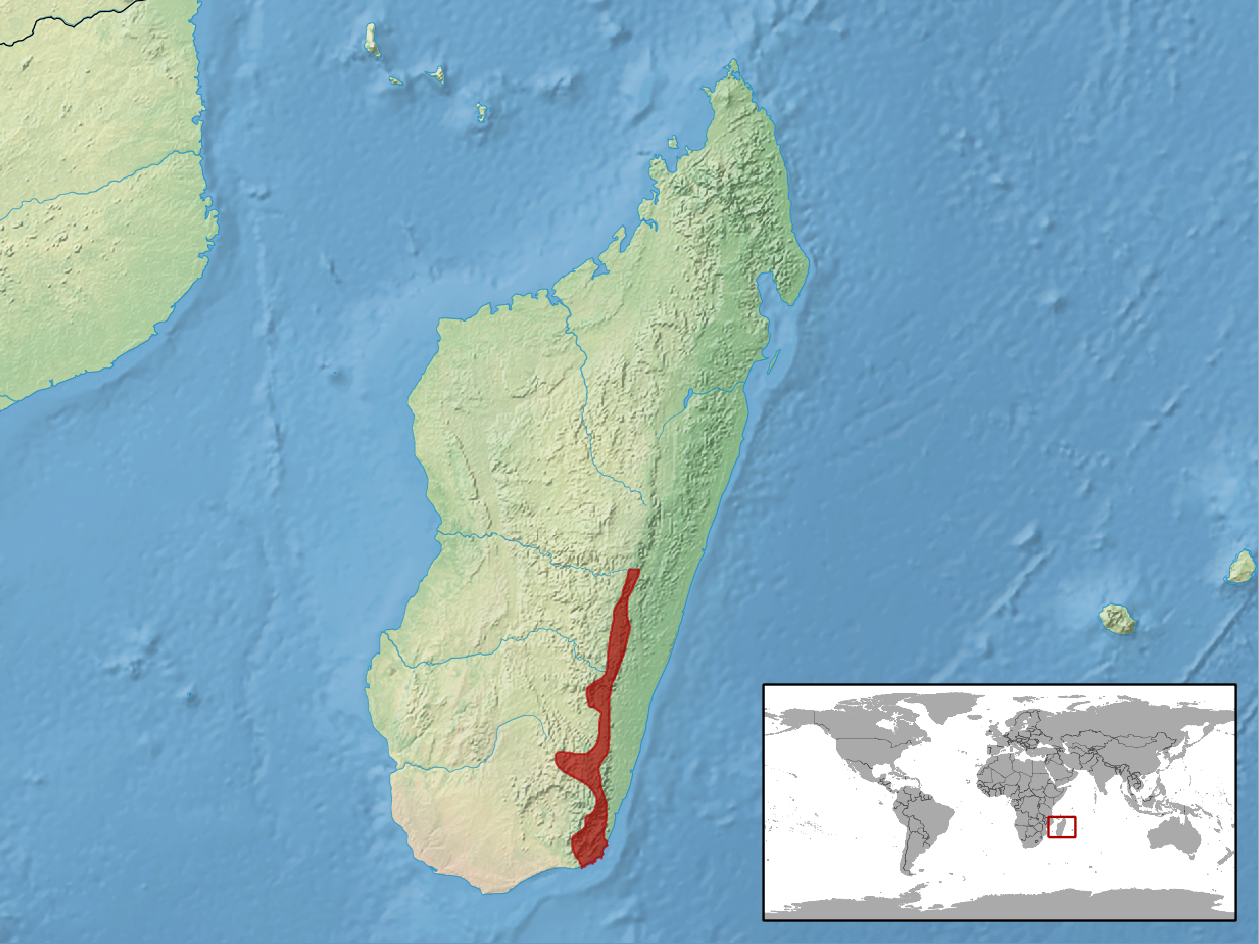

= Palleon nasus =

Species of lizard

Palleon nasus, commonly known as the elongate leaf chameleon, is a species of chameleon endemic to Madagascar. It was initially described by Boulenger in 1887. The species contains two subspecies, P. n. nasus and P. n. pauliani. It grows no more than 9 cm.

== Distribution and habitat ==
Palleon nasus nasus is endemic to Ekongo, south-eastern Madagascar, and its geological type locality is Ekongo, southeastern Madagascar. P. n. pauliani is only known from its type locality of Manjarivolo, l'Andringitra, Madagascar. P. n. pauliani can be found at elevations between 1,620 and 1,650 m (5,310 and 5,410 ft) above mean sea level. P. nasus was listed by the IUCN as a vulnerable species, as it can be found over an area of 15,798 km^{2} (6,100 sq mi), but the quality and extent of the humid forest where the species needs to live is in a continuous decline, mainly due to mining, logging (for charcoal), and the slash-and-burn method in agriculture.

== Taxonomy ==
Palleon nasus nasus was initially described as Brookesia nasus in 1887 by Boulenger and reclassified as a Palleon species in 2013. In 1972, the subspecies P. n. pauliani was described and recorded by Brygoo, Blanc, and Domergue in 1972. Palleon nasus is commonly known as the elongate leaf chameleon.
