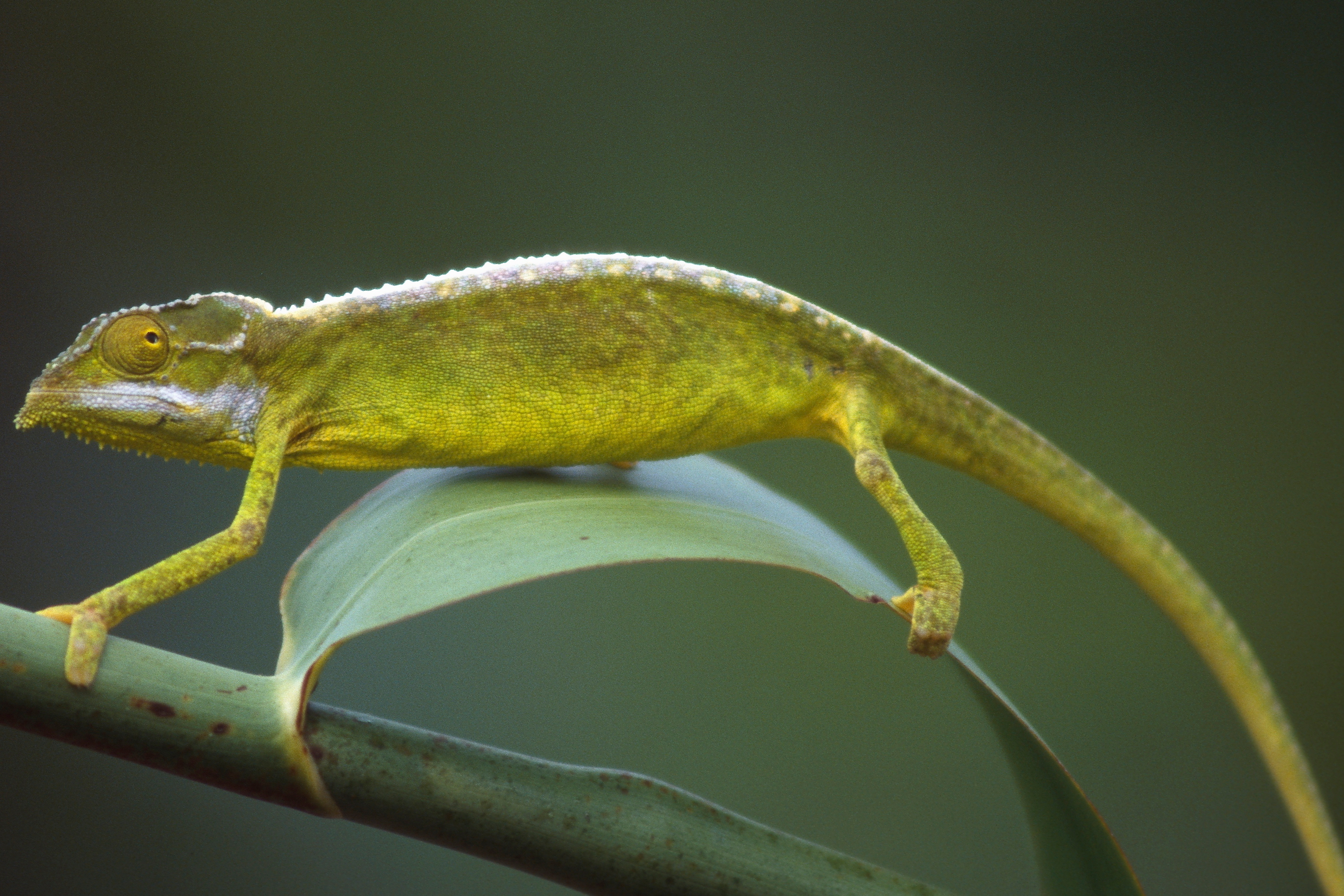
- Tiger chameleon (Archaius tigris)

Conservation status
- Endangered (IUCN 3.1)
- CITES Appendix II

Scientific classification
- Kingdom: Animalia
- Phylum: Chordata
- Class: Reptilia
- Order: Squamata
- Suborder: Iguania
- Family: Chamaeleonidae
- Genus: Archaius; JE Gray, 1865
- Species: A. tigris

Binomial name
- Archaius tigris (Kuhl, 1820)
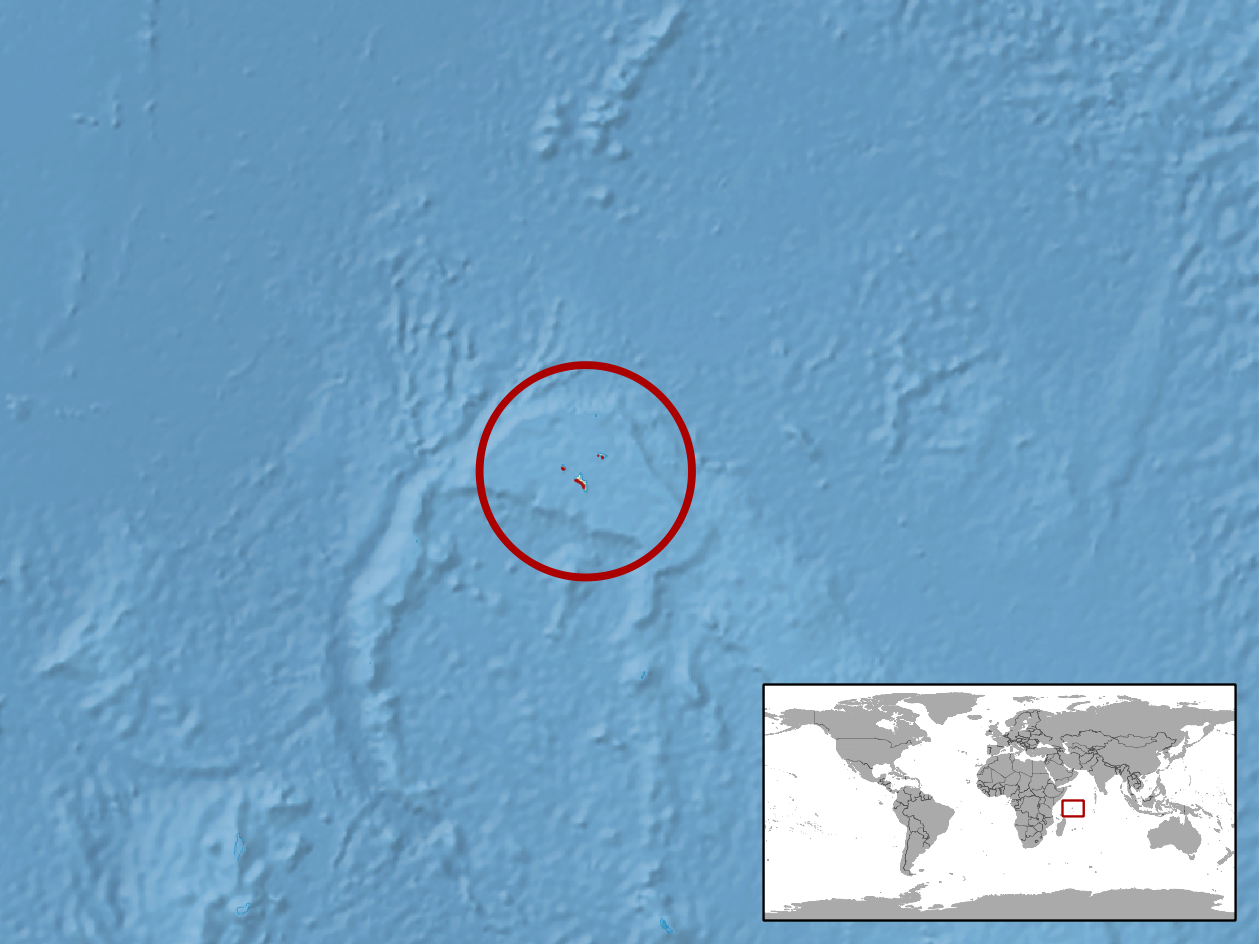

= Tiger chameleon =

Species of lizard

The tiger chameleon (Archaius tigris), (from Greek αρχαίος, meaning "ancient", archaic) also known as the Seychelles tiger chameleon, is the only species in the resurrected genus Archaius. Initially placed into Chamaeleo, it was for some time moved to the genus Calumma by some (Klaver & Böhme, 1986). It is an endangered species of chameleon, found only on the Seychelles islands of Mahé, Silhouette, Sainte Anne and Praslin.

== Endangered status ==
It is listed as endangered on the IUCN Red List, as well as on CITES Appendix II (The Convention on International Trade in Endangered Species of Wild Fauna and Flora), with its distribution limited to an area covering 45 km^{2} (17 sq mi). A 2006 survey estimated the remaining global population to be just under 2,000 individuals.

== Description ==
With a length of just 16 cm (6.3 in), this species is relatively small for a chameleon. Body colour varies from inconspicuous light-grey to a bold yellow-orange, or even green or dark brown, usually with scattered black spots and a pale grey chin and throat. One of the tiger chameleon's most distinctive features, however, is the pointed projection on its chin, which can be up to 3 millimetres long and sits amongst a comb of smaller, spiky outgrowths that border the underside of the chin.

== Habitat and distribution ==
The tiger chameleon is endemic to the Seychelles, occurring only on the islands of Mahé, Silhouette and Praslin. Being an arboreal species, it is found in primary tropical forest, secondary forest where there is high plant diversity, and upland rural gardens, from sea level to 550 metres.

== Behaviour and breeding ==
After a short warming up phase in the morning, this chameleon goes in search of insects and other small animals on which to feed. Like all chameleons, this species hunts by rapidly projecting its elongated sticky tongue at prey. The tongue is tipped by a suction pad capable of ensnaring prey.

Reproduction on the island of Mahé is associated with introduced pineapple plants, in which the tiger chameleon lays its eggs. These plants are not used on Silhouette or Praslin, and the natural nesting sites remain unknown, although the endemic Pandanus and palms are thought to be used. In captivity, clutches contain between five and twelve eggs.

== Threats and conservation ==
As an island endemic with a restricted range of just three small islands, and a population thought to number only 2,000 individuals, the tiger chameleon is particularly vulnerable to changes within its habitat. On the islands of Mahé and Praslin in particular it is threatened by habitat degradation caused by introduced alien plants, such as cinnamon (Cinnamomum verum).

The chameleon and its habitat are protected within the Morne Seychelles (Mahé) and Praslin National Parks. Alien plant control on Praslin and habitat restoration programmes on Silhouette are being undertaken to help contain threats to this species. The main population occurs on Silhouette, where it has been suggested that forested areas containing populations should be given legal protection by being included in a new protected area.

== Bibliography ==
- Townsend, T.M., Tolley, K.A., Glaw, F., Böhme, W. & Vences, M. (2011): Eastward from Africa: palaeocurrent-mediated chameleon dispersal to the Seychelles islands. Biol. Lett. 7(2): 225–228.
- Chameleoninfo.com
