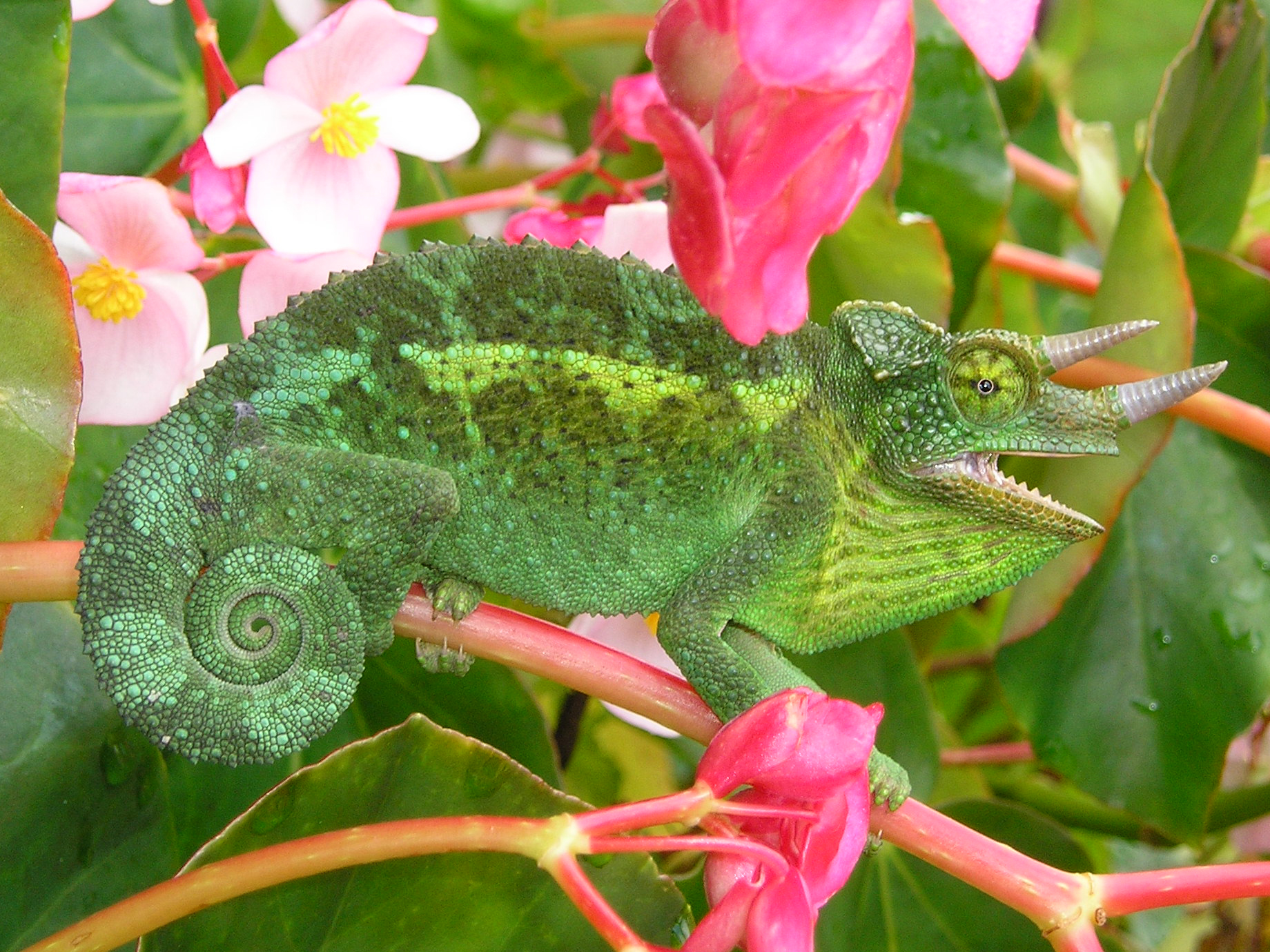
- Male
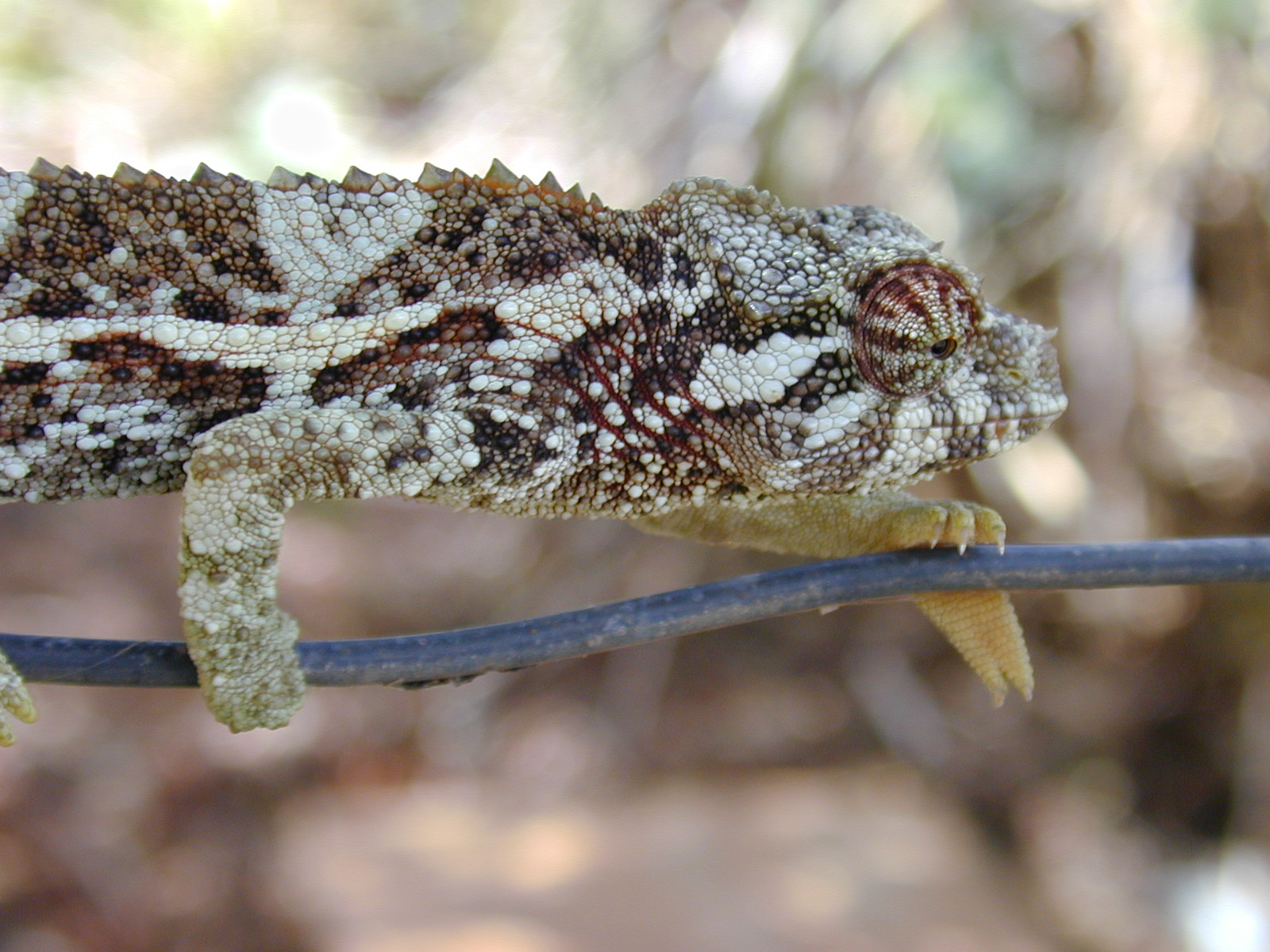
- Female

Conservation status
- Least Concern (IUCN 3.1)

Scientific classification
- Kingdom: Animalia
- Phylum: Chordata
- Class: Reptilia
- Order: Squamata
- Suborder: Iguania
- Family: Chamaeleonidae
- Genus: Trioceros
- Species: T. jacksonii

Binomial name
- Trioceros jacksonii (Boulenger, 1896)
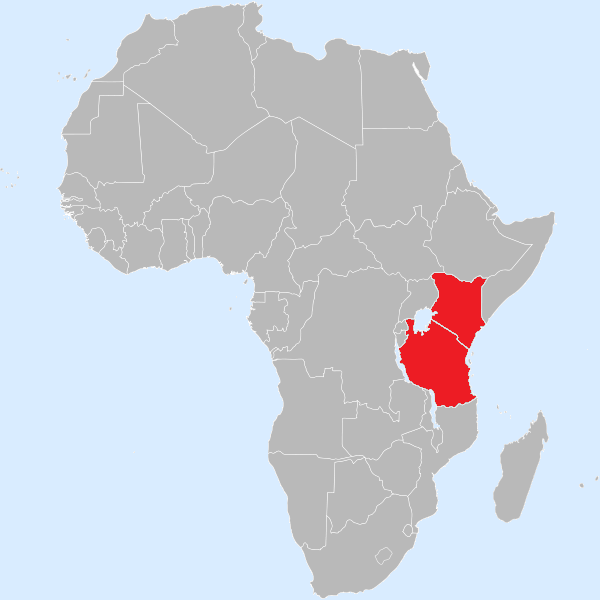
- Map highlighting countries inhabited by the Jackson's chameleon

Synonyms
- Chamaeleon jacksonii Boulenger, 1896; Chameleo jacksonii Bonetti, 2002; Trioceros jacksonii Tilbury & Tolley, 2009

= Jackson's chameleon =

Species of lizard

Jackson's chameleon (Trioceros jacksonii), also known commonly as Jackson's horned chameleon, the three-horned chameleon, and the Kikuyu three-horned chameleon, is a species of chameleon, a lizard in the family Chamaeleonidae. The species is native to East Africa, and introduced to Hawaii, Florida, and California. There are three recognized subspecies.

== Taxonomy ==
Jackson's chameleon was described by Belgian-British zoologist George Albert Boulenger in 1896.

== Etymology ==
The generic name, Trioceros, is derived from the Greek τρί- (tri-) meaning "three" and κέρας (kéras) meaning "horns". This is in reference to the three horns found on the heads of males.

The specific name, jacksonii, is a Latinized form of the last name of English explorer and ornithologist Frederick John Jackson, who was serving as the first Governor of Kenya at the time of Boulenger's description.

== Subspecies ==
The following three subspecies are recognized as being valid, including the nominate subspecies.

- T. j. jacksonii (Boulenger, 1896) – Jackson's chameleon
- T. j. merumontanus (Rand, 1958) – dwarf Jackson's chameleon
- T. j. xantholophus (Eason, Ferguson & Hebrard, 1988) – yellow-crested Jackson's chameleon

Nota bene: A trinomial authority in parentheses indicates that the subspecies was originally described in a genus other thanTrioceros.

== Habitat and geographic range ==
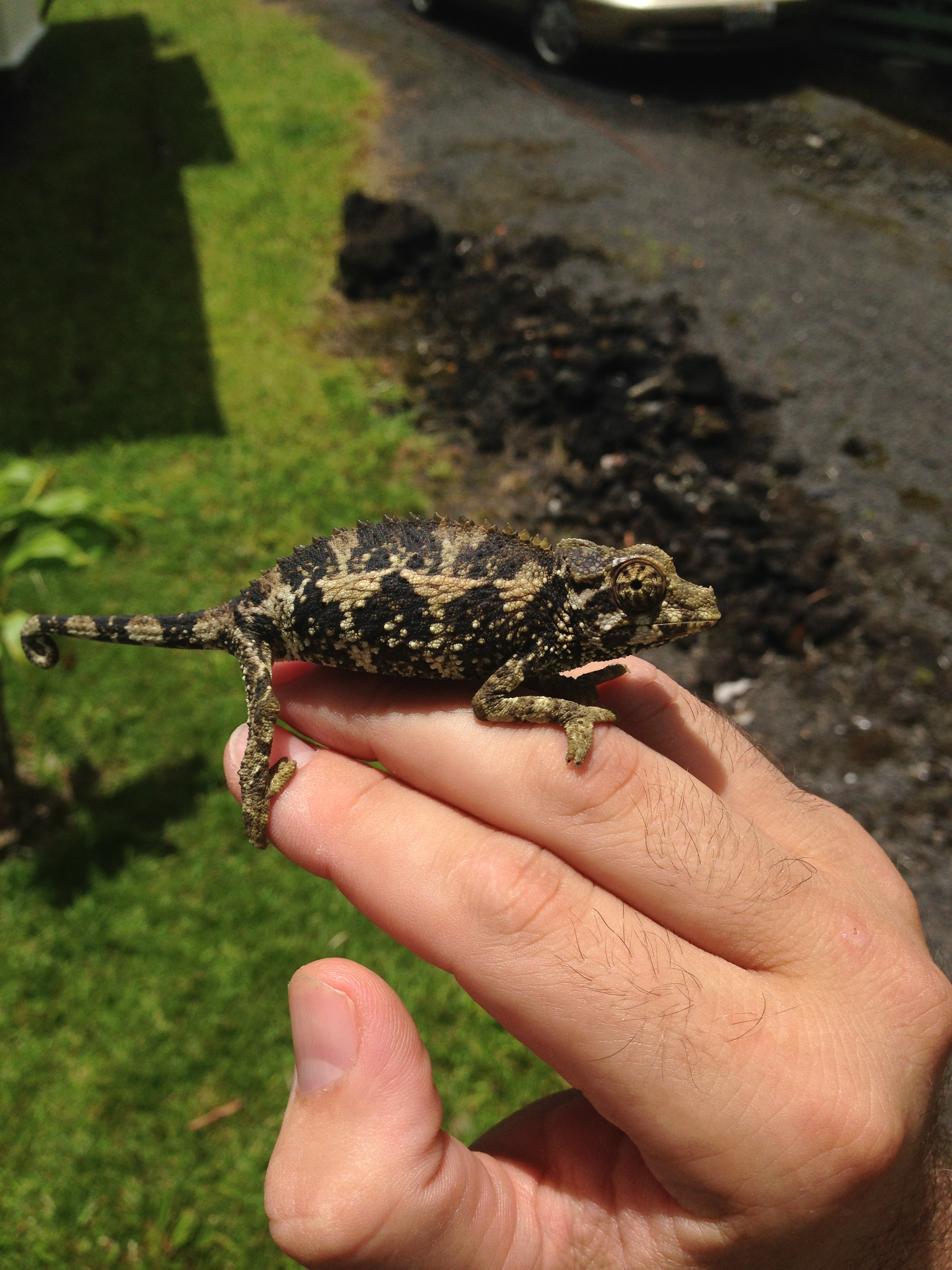
Wild T. j. xantholophus from Hilo, Hawaii

Jackson's chameleon is an arboreal lizard. It is native to woodlands and wet forests at altitudes of 1,600 to 2,440 m (5,250 to 8,010 ft) in south-central Kenya and northern Tanzania. In these areas, the rainfall is seasonal but exceeds 127 cm (50 in) per year. Day temperatures are typically 16–27 °C (61–81 °F), and night temperatures are typically 4–18 °C (39–64 °F). In Tanzania, it is known only from Mount Meru in the Arusha Region, which is the home of the relatively small endemic subspecies T. j. merumontanus. Jackson's chameleon is more widespread in Kenya, where it is even found in wooded areas of some Nairobi suburbs.

The subspecies T. j. xantholophus (native to the Mount Kenya region) was introduced to Hawaii in 1972 and has since established populations on all main islands and has become an invasive species there. This subspecies has also been introduced to Florida. In Hawaii, it is found mainly at altitudes of 100 to 1,000 m (330 to 3,280 ft) in wet, shady places. Historically this population was the primary source of Jackson's chameleons for the exotic pet trade in the United States, but exports from Hawaii are now illegal. This has been done to prevent opportunists from wilfully establishing further feral animal populations to capture and sell them.

== Description ==
Jackson's chameleon is sometimes called the three-horned chameleon because males possess three brown horns: one on the nose (the rostral horn) and one above each superior orbital ridge above the eyes (preocular horns), somewhat reminiscent of the ceratopsid dinosaur genus Triceratops. The females generally have no horns, or instead have traces of the rostral horn (in the subspecies T. j. jacksonii and T. j. merumontanus). The coloring is usually bright green, with some individual animals having traces of blue and yellow, but like all chameleons, it changes color quickly depending on mood, health, and temperature.

Adult males reach a total length (including tail) of up to 38 cm (15 in) and females up to 25 cm (10 in), but more typical lengths are 15 to 25 cm (6 to 10 in). It has a saw-tooth shaped dorsal ridge and no gular crest. It attains sexual maturity after five months. The lifespan is variable, with males generally living longer than females.

The largest subspecies of Jackson's chameleon is T. j. xantholophus, which has been captively bred since the 1980s.

== Ecology ==
=== Feeding habits ===
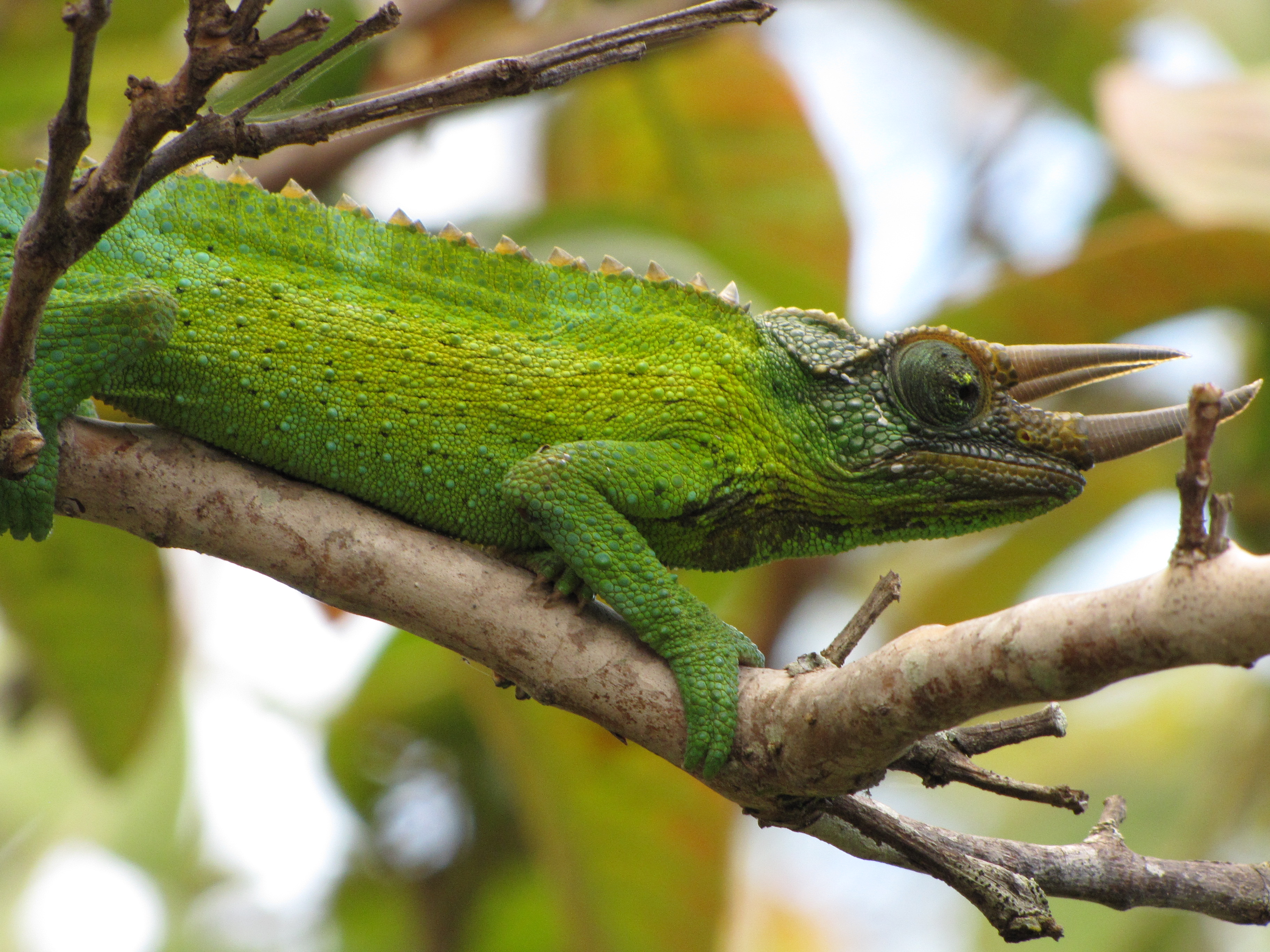
Jackson's chameleon climbing a branch at Enchanting Floral Gardens of Kula, Maui, Hawaii

Jackson's chameleon lives primarily on a diet of small insects. It also preys on centipedes, isopods, millipedes, spiders, lizards, small birds, and snails (Achatinella mustelina) in their native habitat. It is considered to be a cruise forager, as it forages on the go instead of laying in wait.

There is a threat of devastating impact by introduced invasive Jackson's chameleons to native ecosystems in Hawaii, South Africa, the Marshall Islands, Morro Bay, California, Texas, and the Florida Keys. It was found with mainly insects in its stomachs: planthoppers (genus Oliarus), grasshoppers (genus Banza), casebearing caterpillars (genus Hyposmocoma), beetles (genus Oodemas), dragonflies (genus Pantala) and others. It also preys on land snails in Hawaii, including species from genera Achatinella, Auriculella, Lamellidea, and Philonesia, as well as Oxychilus alliarius. It swallows whole snails, including the shells. Jackson's chameleons introduced to Hawaii are a substantial threat to native biodiversity of invertebrates and a serious threat especially to endemic species, such as critically endangered O'ahu tree snails (genus Achatinella).

=== Territoriality ===
T. jacksonii is less territorial than most species of chameleons. Males will generally assert dominance over each other through color displays and posturing in an attempt to secure mating rights, but usually not to the point of physical fights.

== Reproduction ==
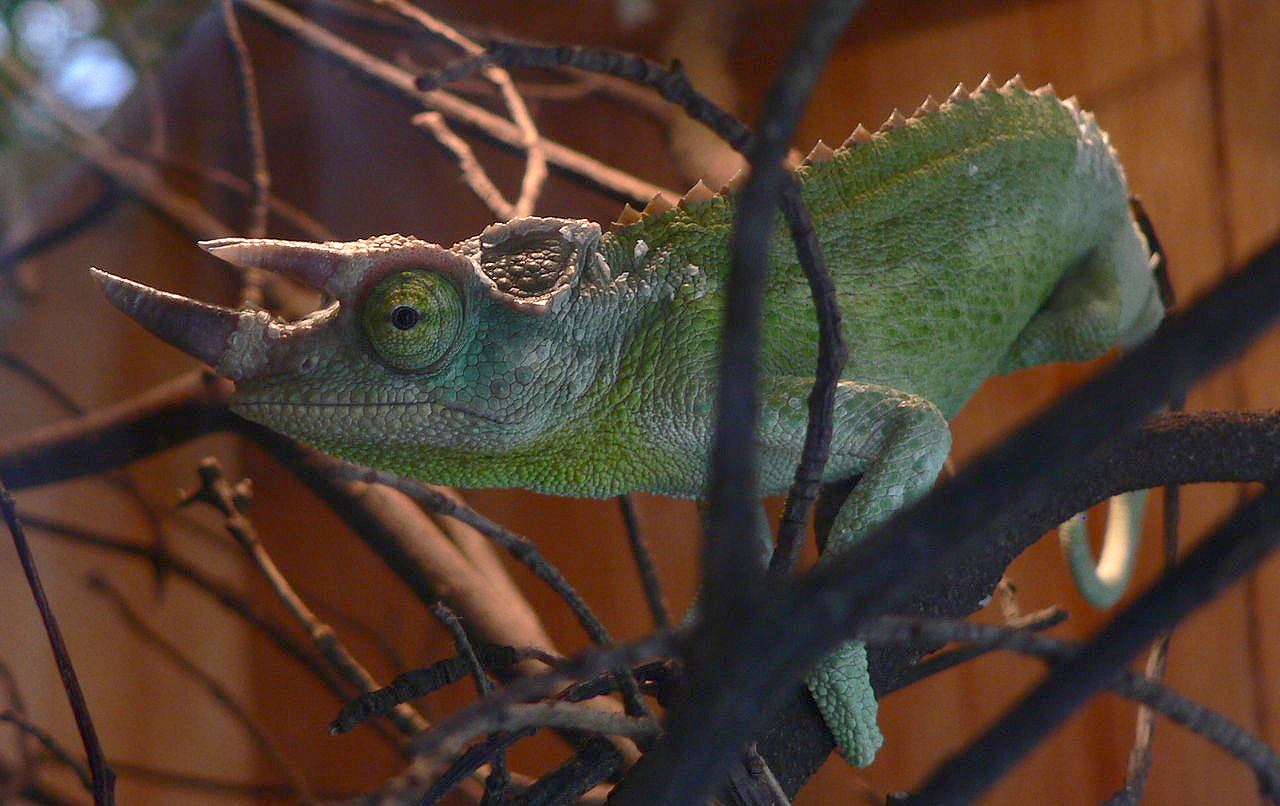
A Jackson's chameleon at the Wellington Zoo

Most chameleons are oviparous, but Jackson's chameleon and several other highland species in the genus Trioceros are ovoviviparous, giving birth to offspring soon after they are ready to hatch from their egg sac; eight to thirty live young are born after a five- to six-month gestation. The subspecies T. j. merumontanus gives birth to five to ten live young.

== In captivity ==
In captivity, Jackson's chameleon requires high humidity, and is in general very needy of colder temperatures during the night. Too much heat, or excessive humidity, can cause eye infections and upper respiratory infections in this species. In captivity, Jackson's chameleon can be expected to live between five and ten years. Jackson's chameleon requires an array of different food options to remain healthy.
