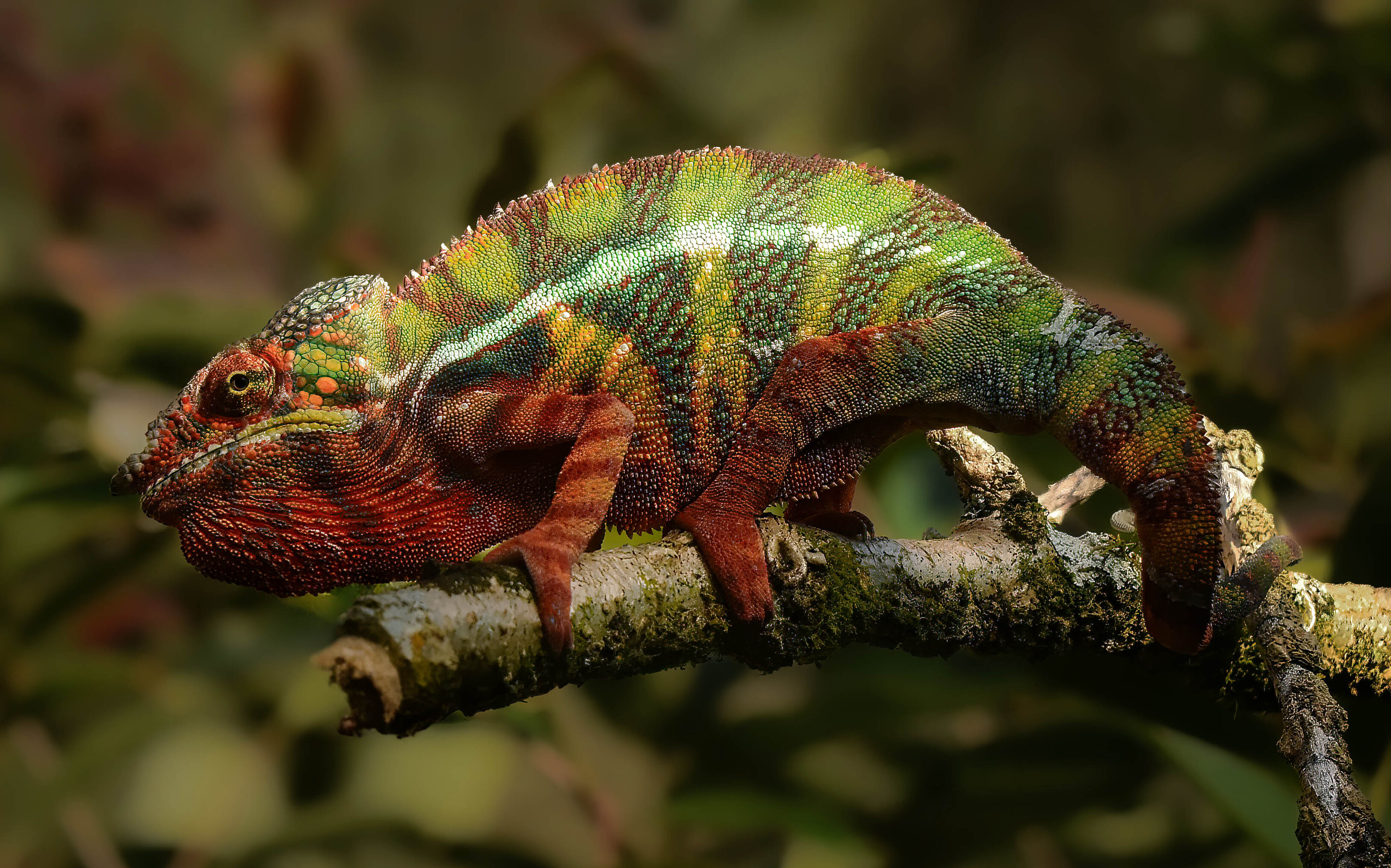
- Panther chameleon

Scientific classification
- Kingdom: Animalia
- Phylum: Chordata
- Class: Reptilia
- Order: Squamata
- Suborder: Iguania
- Infraorder: Acrodonta
- Family: Chamaeleonidae; Rafinesque, 1815

Genera
- Brookesiinae; Brookesia; Palleon; Chamaeleoninae; Archaius; Bradypodion; Calumma; Chamaeleo; Furcifer; Kinyongia; Nadzikambia; Rieppeleon; Rhampholeon; Trioceros
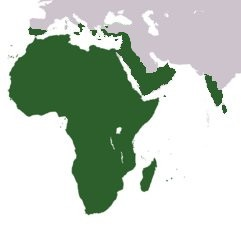
- Native range of Chamaeleonidae

= Chameleon =

Chameleons Temporal range: Early Miocene – present, 26–0 Ma Middle Paleocene origins

Family of reptiles

Chameleons (family Chamaeleonidae) are a distinctive and highly specialized clade of Old World lizards with 200 species described as of June 2015. The members of this family are best known for their distinct range of colours, being capable of colour-shifting camouflage. The large number of species in the family exhibit considerable variability in their capacity to change colour. For some, it is more of a shift of brightness (shades of brown); for others, a plethora of colour-combinations (reds, yellows, greens, blues) can be seen.

Chameleons are also distinguished by their zygodactylous feet, their prehensile tail, their laterally compressed bodies, their head casques, their projectile tongues used for catching prey, their swaying gait, and in some species crests or horns on their brow and snout. Chameleons' eyes are independently mobile, and because of this the chameleon's brain is constantly analyzing two separate, individual images of its environment. When hunting prey, the eyes focus forward in coordination, affording stereoscopic vision.

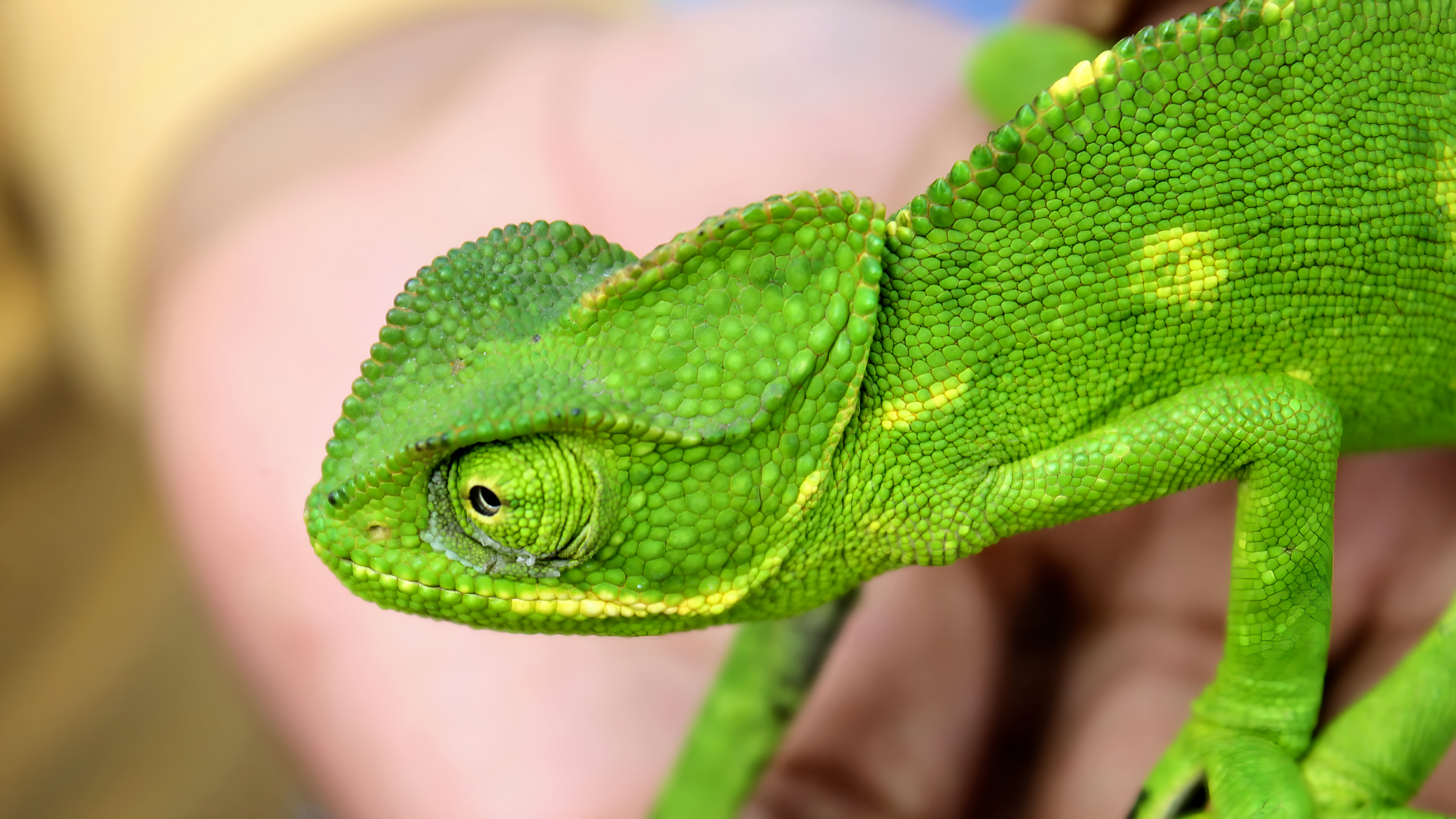
Chameleons' eye coordination

Chameleons are diurnal and adapted for visual hunting of invertebrates, mostly insects, although the large species also can catch small vertebrates. Chameleons typically are arboreal, but there are also many species that live on the ground. The arboreal species use their prehensile tail as an extra anchor point when they are moving or resting in trees or bushes; because of this, their tail is often referred to as a "fifth limb". Depending on species, they range from rainforest to desert conditions and from lowlands to highlands, with the vast majority occurring in Africa (about half of the species are restricted to Madagascar), but with a single species in southern Europe, and a few across southern Asia as far east as India and Sri Lanka. They have been introduced to Hawaii and Florida.

== Etymology ==
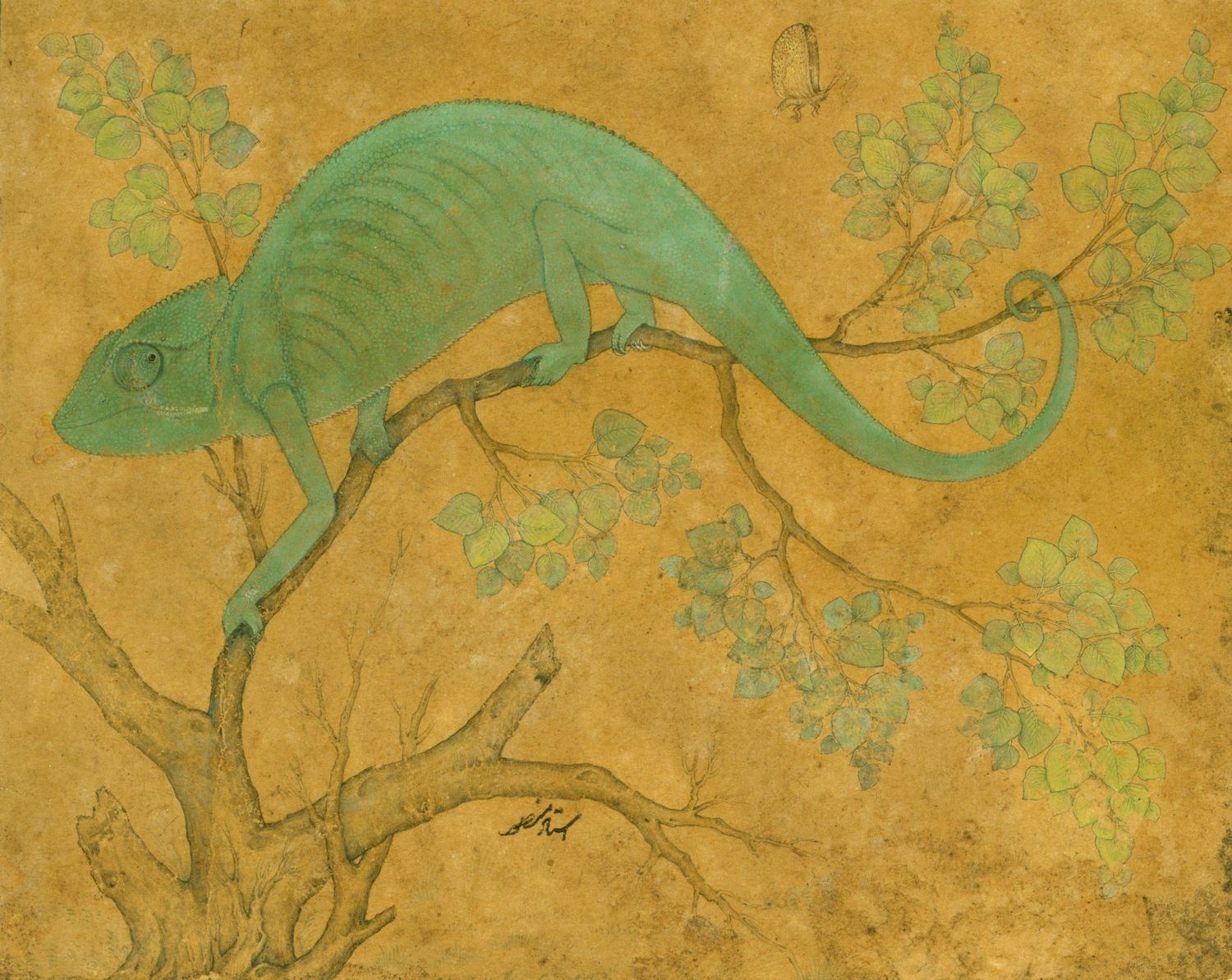
Mughal era painting of a chameleon by Ustad Mansur

The English word chameleon (/kəˈmiːliən/ kə-MEE-lee-ən, or /kəˈmiːljən/ kə-MEEL-yən) is a simplified spelling of Latin chamaeleōn, a borrowing of the Greek χαμαιλέων (khamailéōn), a compound of χαμαί (khamaí) "on the ground" and λέων (léōn) "lion".

== Classification ==
In 1986, the family Chamaeleonidae was divided into two subfamilies, Brookesiinae and Chamaeleoninae. Under this classification, Brookesiinae included the genera Brookesia and Rhampholeon, as well as the genera later split off from them (Palleon and Rieppeleon), while Chamaeleoninae included the genera Bradypodion, Calumma, Chamaeleo, Furcifer and Trioceros, as well as the genera later split off from them (Archaius, Nadzikambia and Kinyongia). Since that time, however, the validity of this subfamily designation has been the subject of much debate, although most phylogenetic studies support the notion that the pygmy chameleons of the subfamily Brookesiinae are not a monophyletic group.

While some authorities have previously preferred to use this subfamilial classification on the basis of the absence of evidence principle, these authorities later abandoned this subfamilial division, no longer recognizing any subfamilies with the family Chamaeleonidae.

In 2015, however, Glaw reworked the subfamilial division by placing only the genera Brookesia and Palleon within the Brookesiinae subfamily, with all other genera being placed in Chamaeleoninae.

== Change of colour ==
Some chameleon species are able to change their skin colouration. Chameleon skin contains a layered arrangement of specialised cells known as the dermal chromatophores. Starting from the surface, it comprises "xanthophores" and "erythrophores" (yellow and red), as well as an intermediate layer of iridophores whose transparent lattice-shaped guanine nanocrystals generate structural colour through optical interference, and basal "melanophores" containing dark melanin. The colour at a given time is the result of light interacting with all these layers simultaneously.

The colour change in chameleons is controlled by two superimposed layers of iridophores. The superficial layer (S-iridophores) contains small guanine crystals in a triangular photonic crystal lattice, and the deeper layer (D-iridophores) contains larger crystals that broadly reflect light, especially in the near-infrared range.

The skin colour shifts as the chameleon is able to actively "excite" these crystals, changing the spacing between them, and this then affects which wavelengths of light are reflected and which are absorbed. In a resting state, the crystals are much more closely spaced than in an excited state, causing the lattice to reflect blue light, which, filtered through the overlying yellow xanthophores, produces the ordinary green. When the spacing of crystals changes in the excited state, the wavelengths reflected by the iridophore layer can quickly shift to yellow, orange, red, or back to blue. When combined with the normal pigment contained in the other skin layers, this forms the final colour visible to the eye.

The exact mechanism by which chameleons can adjust the spacing of their iridophore crystals is not fully determined. Nevertheless, Iridophores share the neural crest of all other chromatophores, which are regulated through neural or hormonal signals, as such some uncertain analgous signal is thought to be how the lattice adjustments are triggered.

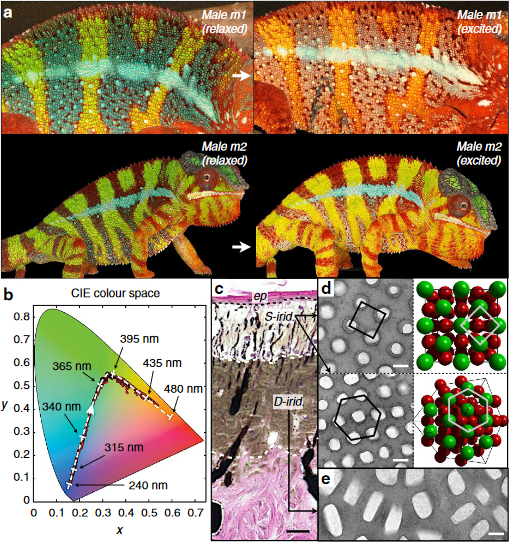
Colour change and iridophore types in panther chameleons: (a) Reversible colour of two males, one relaxed (m1), and one excited (m2). During excitation, background skin shifts from the baseline state (green) to yellow/orange, and both vertical bars and horizontal mid-body stripe shift from blue (m1) to whitish (m2). (b) Red dots show change in the CIE chromaticity chart of a male with green skin. white line: optical response in numerical simulations using a face-centred cubic lattice of guanine crystals with lattice parameter indicated with black arrows. (c) Haematoxylin and eosin staining of a cross-section of white skin showing the epidermis and the two thick layers of iridophores. (d) TEM images of guanine nanocrystals in S-iridophores in the excited state and three-dimensional model of an FCC lattice (shown in two orientations). (e) TEM image of guanine nanocrystals in D-iridophores.

Colour change in chameleons has functions in camouflage, but most commonly in social signalling and reactions to temperature and other conditions. The relative importance of these functions varies with the circumstances, as well as the species. Colour change signals a chameleon's physiological condition and intentions to other chameleons. Because chameleons are ectothermic, another reason why they change colour is to regulate their body temperatures, either to a darker colour to absorb light and heat to raise their temperature, or to a lighter colour to reflect light and heat, thereby either stabilizing or lowering their body temperature. Chameleons tend to show brighter colours when displaying aggression to other chameleons, and darker colours when they submit or "give up". Most chameleon genera (exceptions are Chamaeleo, Rhampholeon and Rieppeleon) have blue fluorescence in a species-specific pattern in their skull tubercles, and in Brookesia there is also some in tubercles on the body. The fluorescence is derived from bones that only are covered in very thin skin and possibly serves a signaling role, especially in shaded habitats.

Some species, such as Smith's dwarf chameleon and several others in the genus Bradypodion, adjust their colours for camouflage depending on the vision of the specific predator species (for example, bird or snake) by which they are being threatened. In the introduced Hawaiian population of Jackson's chameleon, conspicuous colour changes that are used for communication between chameleons have increased, whereas anti-predator camouflage colour changes have decreased relative to the native source population in Kenya, where there are more predators.

Chameleon colour palettes have evolved through their endemic environment. Chameleons living in the forest have a more defined and colourful palette compared to those living in the desert or savanna, which have more of a basic, brown, and charred palette.

== Evolution ==
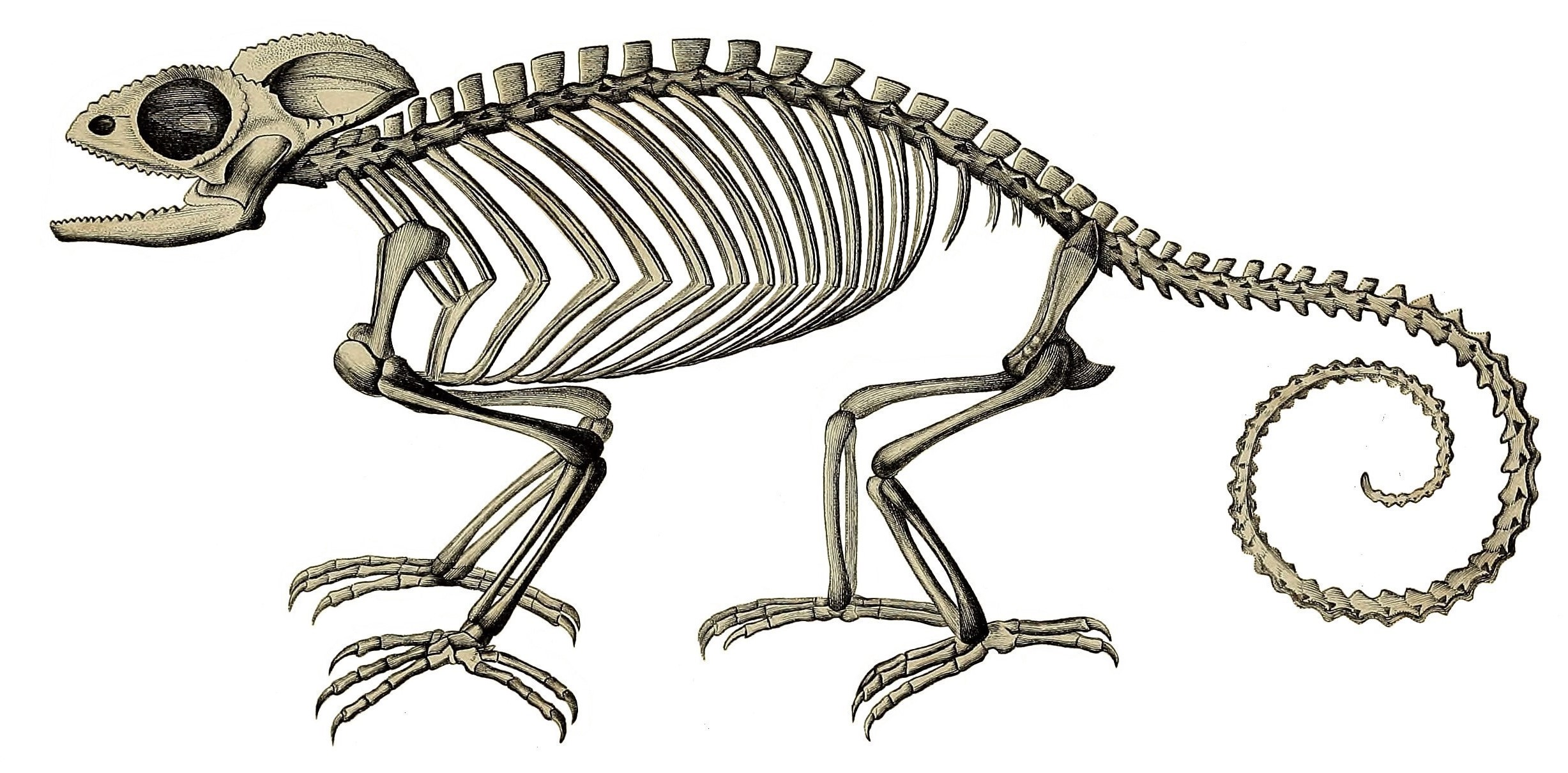
Skeleton of common chameleon

The oldest described chameleon is Anqingosaurus brevicephalus from the Middle Paleocene (about 58.7–61.7 mya) of China. Other chameleon fossils include Chamaeleo caroliquarti from the Lower Miocene (about 13–23 mya) of the Czech Republic and Germany, and Chamaeleo intermedius from the Middle Miocene (Fort Ternan, 13.7 Ma) of Kenya.

The chameleons are probably far older than that, perhaps sharing a common ancestor with iguanids and agamids more than 100 Ma (agamids being more closely related). Since fossils have been found in Africa, Europe, and Asia, chameleons were certainly once more widespread than they are today.

Although nearly half of all chameleon species today live in Madagascar, this offers no basis for speculation that chameleons might originate from there. In fact, it has recently been shown that chameleons most likely originated in mainland Africa. It appears there were two distinct oceanic migrations from the mainland to Madagascar. The diverse speciation of chameleons has been theorized to have directly reflected the increase in open habitats (savannah, grassland, and heathland) that accompanied the Oligocene period. Monophyly of the family is supported by several studies.

Daza et al. (2016) described a small (10.6 mm in snout-vent length), probably neonatal lizard preserved in the Cretaceous (Albian-Cenomanian boundary) amber from Myanmar. The authors noted that the lizard has "short and wide skull, large orbits, elongated and robust lingual process, frontal with parallel margins, incipient prefrontal boss, reduced vomers, absent retroarticular process, low presacral vertebral count (between 15 and 17) and extremely short, curled tail"; the authors considered these traits to be indicative of the lizard's affiliation with Chamaeleonidae. The phylogenetic analysis conducted by the authors indicated that the lizard was a stem-chamaeleonid. However, Matsumoto & Evans (2018) reinterpreted this specimen as an albanerpetontid amphibian. This specimen was given the name Yaksha perettii in 2020, and was noted to have several convergently chameleon-like features, including adaptations for ballistic feeding.

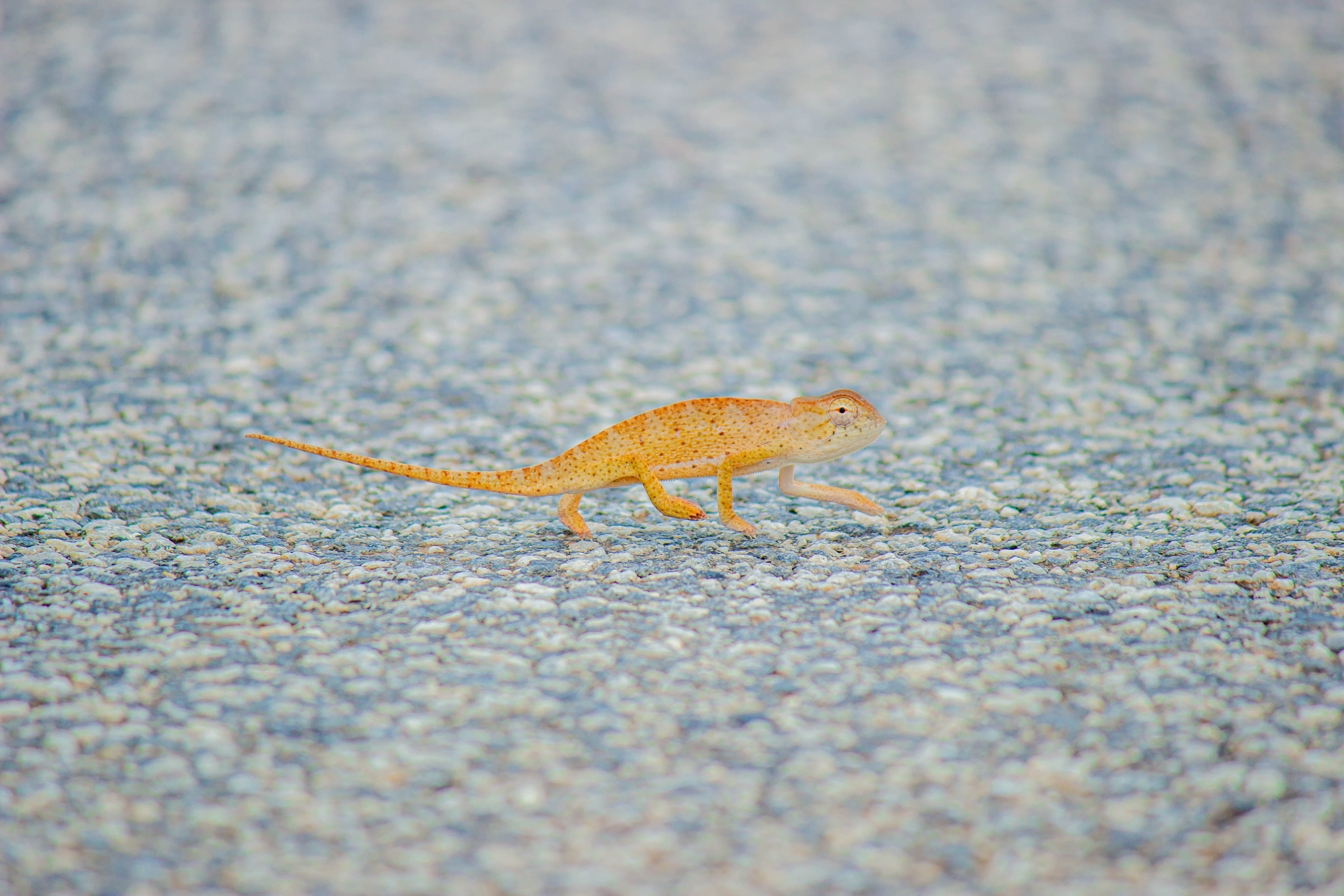
Chameleon in Ghana

While the exact evolutionary history of colour change in chameleons is still unknown, there is one aspect of the evolutionary history of chameleon colour change that has already been conclusively studied: the effects of signal efficacy. Signal efficacy, or how well the signal can be seen against its background, has been shown to correlate directly to the spectral qualities of chameleon displays. Dwarf chameleons, the chameleon of study, occupy a wide variety of habitats from forests to grasslands to shrubbery. It was demonstrated that chameleons in brighter areas tended to present brighter signals, but chameleons in darker areas tended to present relatively more contrasting signals to their backgrounds. This finding suggests that signal efficacy (and thus habitat) has affected the evolution of chameleon signaling. Stuart-Fox et al. note that it makes sense that selection for crypsis is not seen to be as important as selection for signal efficacy, because the signals are only shown briefly; chameleons are almost always muted cryptic colours.

Viviparity evolved twice in chamaeleonids, and it is believed that both of these developments of viviparity occurred by at least the Early Oligocene, some 30 to 29 Ma.

== Description ==
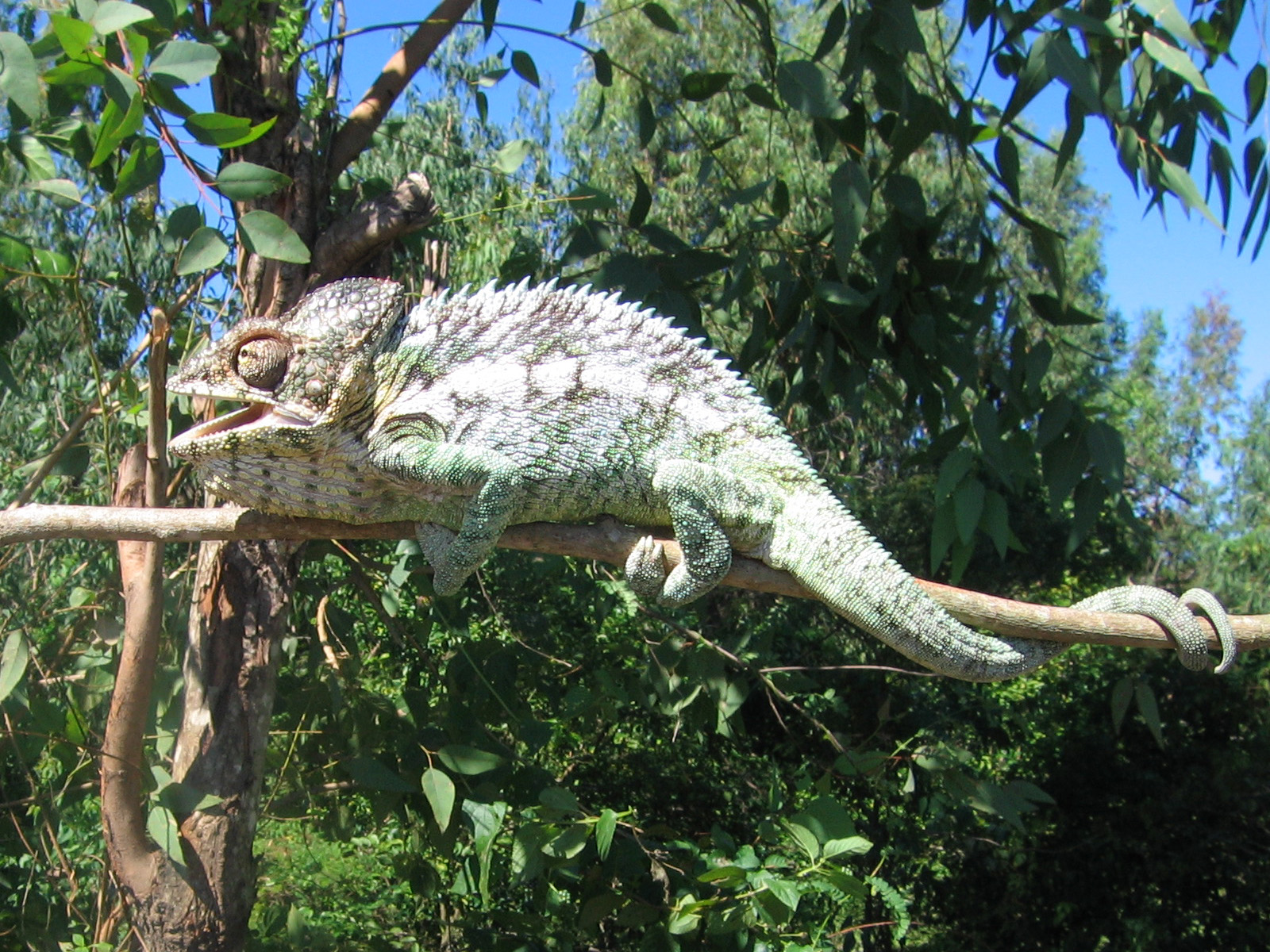
Nearly all species of chameleon have prehensile tails, but they most often grip with the tail when they cannot use all four feet at once, such as when passing from one twig to another.

Chameleons vary greatly in size and body structure, with maximum total lengths varying from 22 mm (0.87 in) in male Brookesia nana (one of the world's smallest reptiles) to 68.5 cm (27.0 in) in the male Furcifer oustaleti. Many have head or facial ornamentation, such as nasal protrusions, or horn-like projections in the case of Trioceros jacksonii, or large crests on top of their heads, like Chamaeleo calyptratus. Many species are sexually dimorphic, and males are typically much more ornamented than the female chameleons.

Typical sizes of species of chameleon commonly kept in captivity or as pets are:

| Scientific name | Common name | Length (male) | Length (female) | Colour | Lifespan (years) |
|---|---|---|---|---|---|
| Chamaeleo calyptratus | Veiled chameleon | 35–60 cm | 25–33 cm | Green and light colours | about 5 |
| Trioceros jacksonii | Jackson's chameleon | 23–33 cm | 25–33 cm | Green and light colours | 5–10 |
| Furcifer pardalis | Panther chameleon | 38–53 cm | 23–33 cm | Darker colours | about 5 (2–3 for birthing females) |
| Rieppeleon brevicaudatus | Bearded pygmy chameleon | 5–8 cm | 5–8 cm | Brown, beige, green | about 3–5 |
| Rhampholeon spectrum | Spectral pygmy chameleon | 8–10 cm | 5–10 cm | Tan and gray | 3–5 |
| Rhampholeon temporalis | Usambara pitted pygmy chameleon | 6–10 cm | 5–9 cm | Gray and brown | 5–11 |

The feet of chameleons are highly adapted to arboreal locomotion, and species such as Chamaeleo namaquensis that have secondarily adopted a terrestrial habit have retained the same foot morphology with little modification. On each foot, the five distinguished toes are grouped into two fascicles. The toes in each fascicle are bound into a flattened group of either two or three, giving each foot a tongs-like appearance. On the front feet, the outer, lateral, group contains two toes, whereas the inner, medial, group contains three. On the rear feet, this arrangement is reversed, the medial group containing two toes, and the lateral group three. These specialized feet allow chameleons to grip tightly onto narrow or rough branches. Furthermore, each toe is equipped with a sharp claw to afford a grip on surfaces such as bark when climbing. It is common to refer to the feet of chameleons as didactyl or zygodactyl, though neither term is fully satisfactory, both being used in describing different feet, such as the zygodactyl feet of parrots or didactyl feet of sloths or ostriches, none of which is significantly like chameleon feet. Although "zygodactyl" is reasonably descriptive of chameleon foot anatomy, their foot structure does not resemble that of parrots, to which the term was first applied. As for didactyly, chameleons visibly have five toes on each foot, not two.

Some chameleons have a crest of small spikes extending along the spine from the proximal part of the tail to the neck; both the extent and size of the spikes vary between species and individuals. These spikes help break up the definitive outline of the chameleon, which aids it when trying to blend into a background.

=== Senses ===
Chameleon upper and lower eyelids are joined, with only a pinhole large enough for the pupil to see through. Each eye can pivot and focus independently, allowing the chameleon to observe two different objects simultaneously. This gives them a full 360-degree arc of vision around their bodies. Prey is located using monocular depth perception, not stereopsis. Chameleons have the highest magnification (per size) of any vertebrate, with the highest density of cones in the retina.

Like snakes, chameleons do not have an outer or a middle ear, so there is neither an ear-opening nor an eardrum. However, chameleons are not deaf: they can detect sound frequencies in the range of 200–600 Hz.

Chameleons can see in both visible and ultraviolet light. Chameleons exposed to ultraviolet light show increased social behavior and activity levels, are more inclined to bask, feed, and reproduce as it has a positive effect on the pineal gland.

=== Feeding ===
All chameleons are primarily insectivores that feed by ballistically projecting their long tongues from their mouths to capture prey located some distance away. While the chameleons' tongues are typically thought to be one and a half to two times the length of their bodies (their length excluding the tail), smaller chameleons (both smaller species and smaller individuals of the same species) have recently been found to have proportionately larger tongue apparatuses than their larger counterparts. Thus, smaller chameleons are able to project their tongues greater distances than the larger chameleons that are the subject of most studies and tongue length estimates, and can project their tongues more than twice their body length.

The tongue apparatus consists of highly modified hyoid bones, tongue muscles, and collagenous elements. The hyoid bone has an elongated, parallel-sided projection, called the entoglossal process, over which a tubular muscle, the accelerator muscle, sits. The accelerator muscle contracts around the entoglossal process and is responsible for creating the work to power tongue projection, both directly and through the loading of collagenous elements located between the entoglossal process and the accelerator muscle. The tongue retractor muscle, the hyoglossus, connects the hyoid and accelerator muscle, and is responsible for drawing the tongue back into the mouth following tongue projection.

Tongue projection occurs at extremely high performance, reaching the prey in as little as 0.07 seconds, having been launched at accelerations exceeding 41 g. The power with which the tongue is launched, known to exceed 3000 W kg^{−1}, exceeds that which muscle is able to produce, indicating the presence of an elastic power amplifier to power tongue projection. The recoil of elastic elements in the tongue apparatus is thus responsible for large percentages of the overall tongue projection performance.

One consequence of the incorporation of an elastic recoil mechanism to the tongue projection mechanism is relative thermal insensitivity of tongue projection relative to tongue retraction, which is powered by muscle contraction alone, and is heavily thermally sensitive. While other ectothermic animals become sluggish as their body temperatures decline, due to a reduction in the contractile velocity of their muscles, chameleons are able to project their tongues at high performance even at low body temperatures. The thermal sensitivity of tongue retraction in chameleons, however, is not a problem, as chameleons have a very effective mechanism of holding onto their prey once the tongue has come into contact with it, including surface phenomena, such as wet adhesion and interlocking, and suction. The thermal insensitivity of tongue projection thus enables chameleons to feed effectively on cold mornings prior to being able to behaviorally elevate their body temperatures through thermoregulation, when other sympatric lizards species are still inactive, likely temporarily expanding their thermal niche as a result.

Use of tongue in feeding

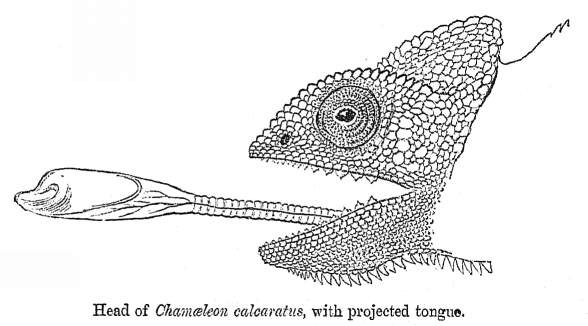
Tongue structure, with cup-like end

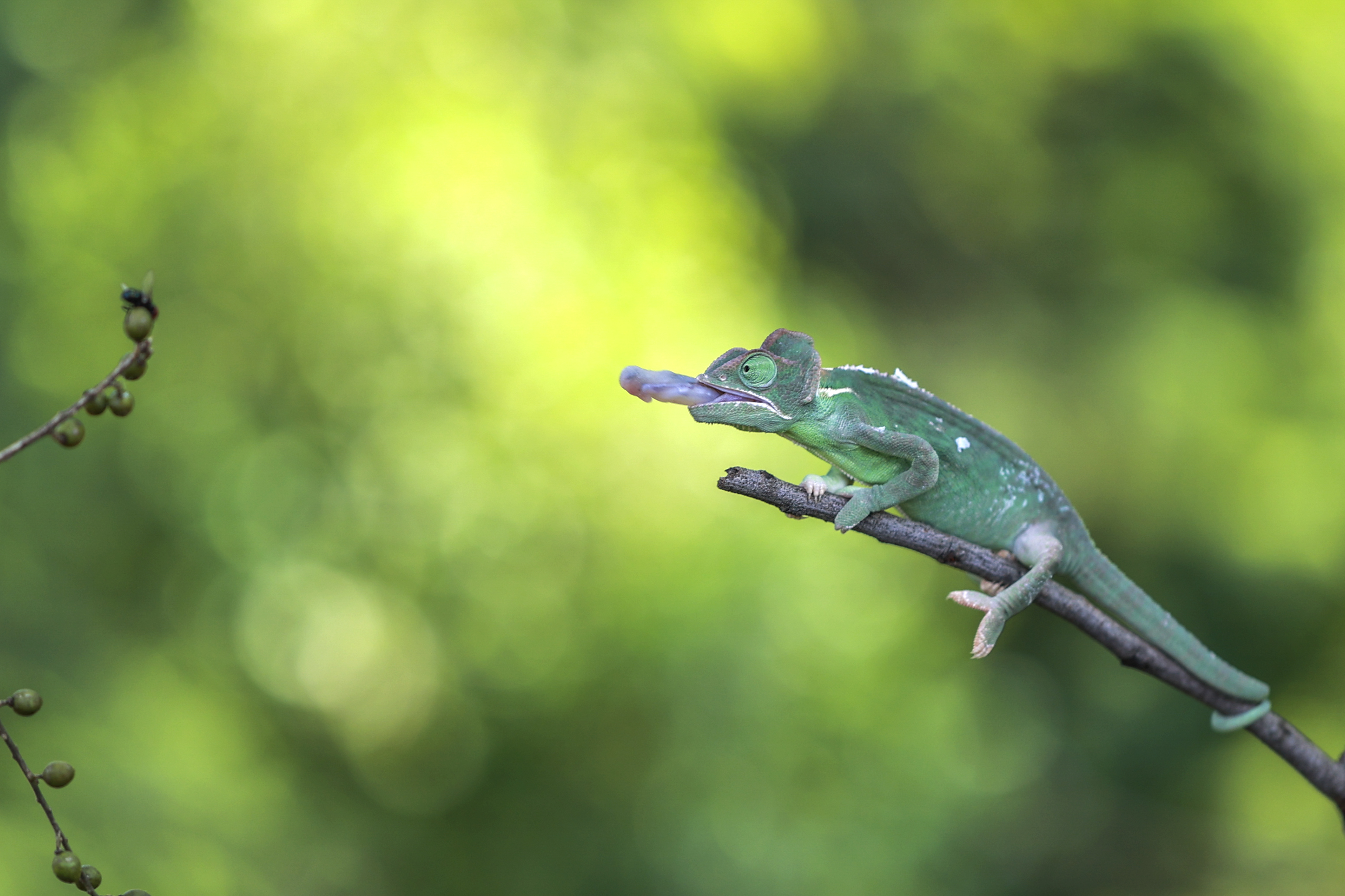
Tongue begins strike

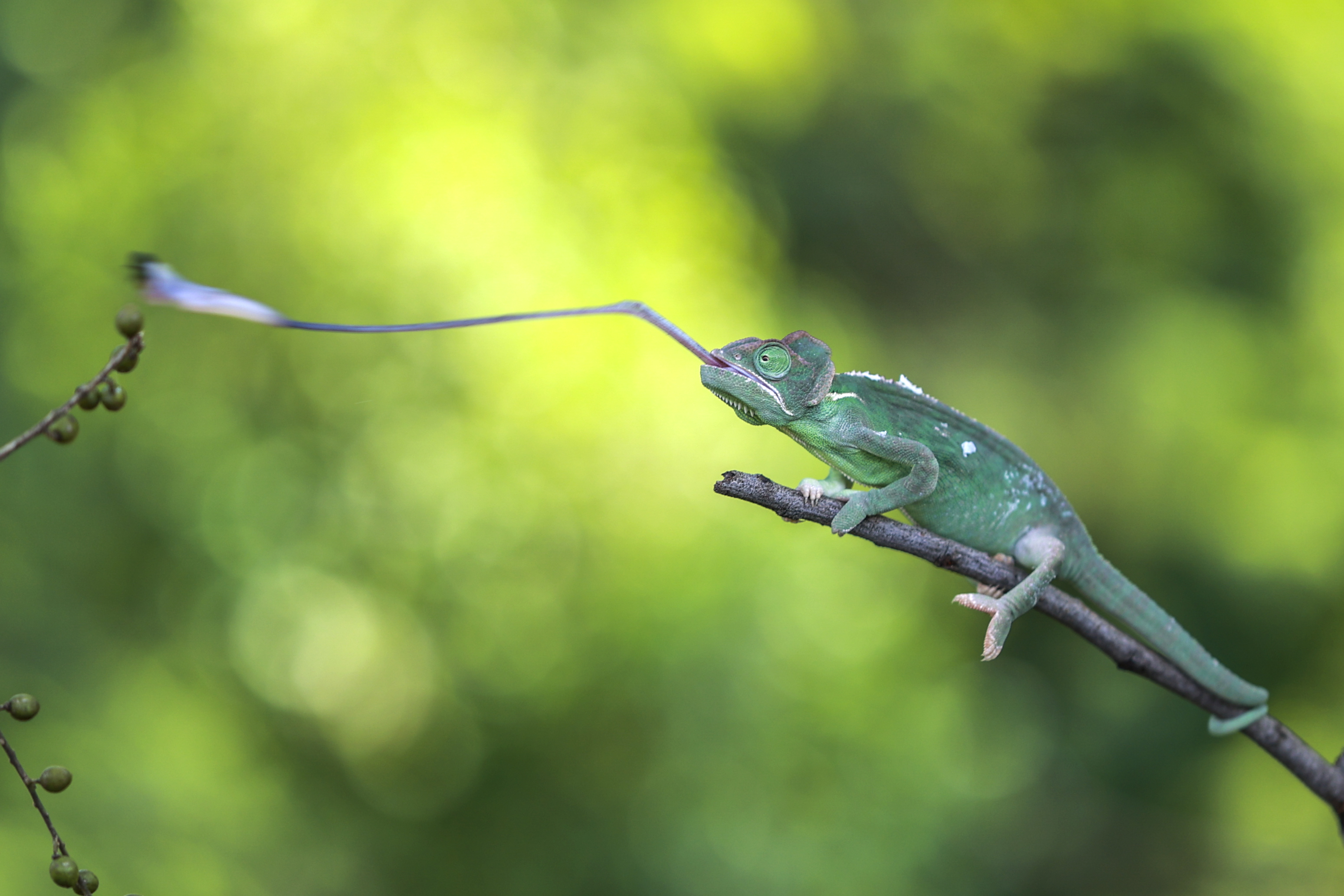
Capturing prey

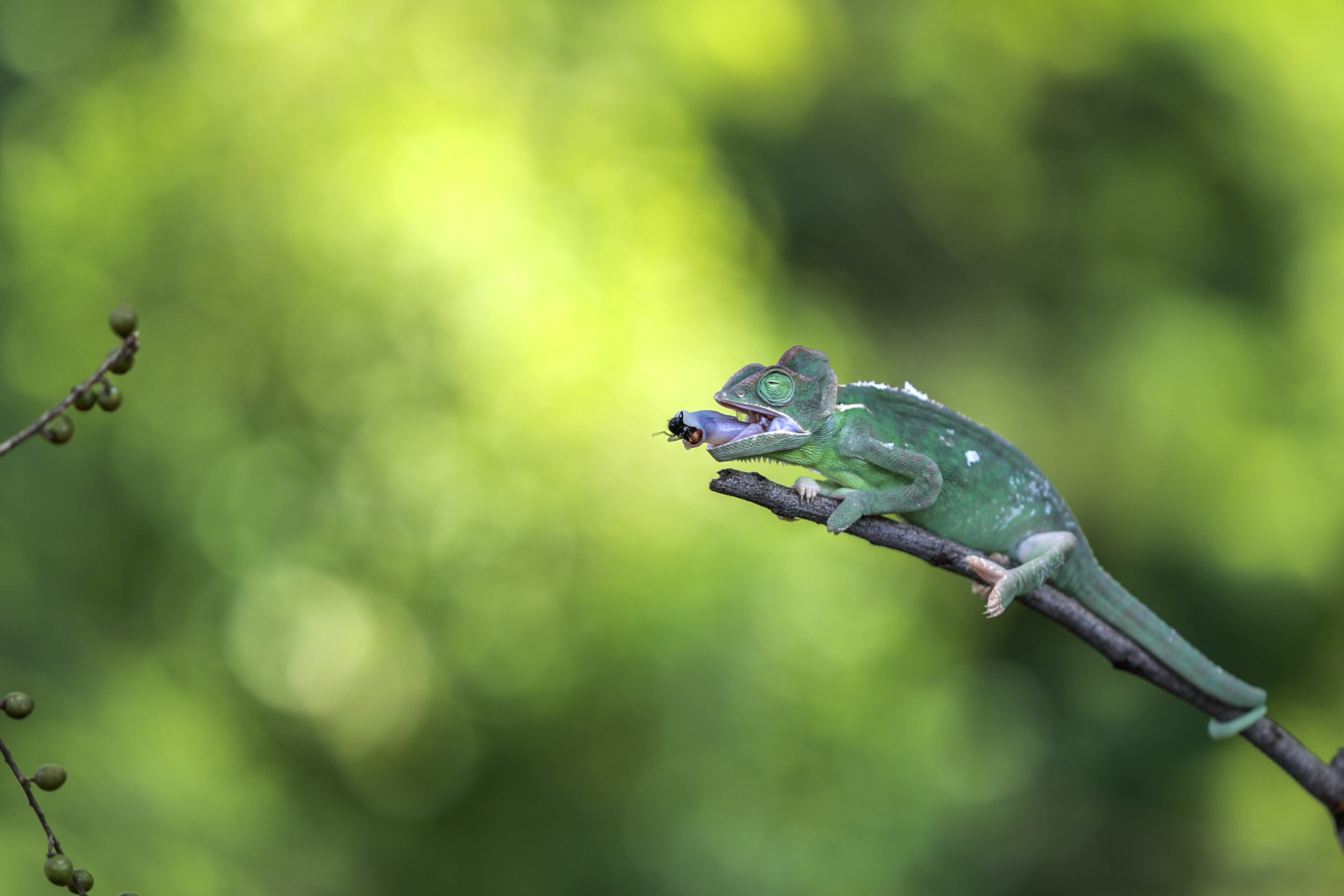
Bringing prey to the mouth

=== Bones ===
Certain species of chameleons have bones that glow when under ultraviolet light, also known as biogenic fluorescence. Some 31 different species of Calumma chameleons, all native to Madagascar, displayed this fluorescence in CT scans. The bones emitted a bright blue glow and could even shine through the chameleon's four layers of skin. The face was found to have a different glow, appearing as dots otherwise known as tubercles on facial bones. The glow results from proteins, pigments, chitin, and other materials that make up a chameleon's skeleton, possibly giving chameleons a secondary signaling system that does not interfere with their colour-changing ability, and may have evolved from sexual selection.

== Distribution and habitat ==
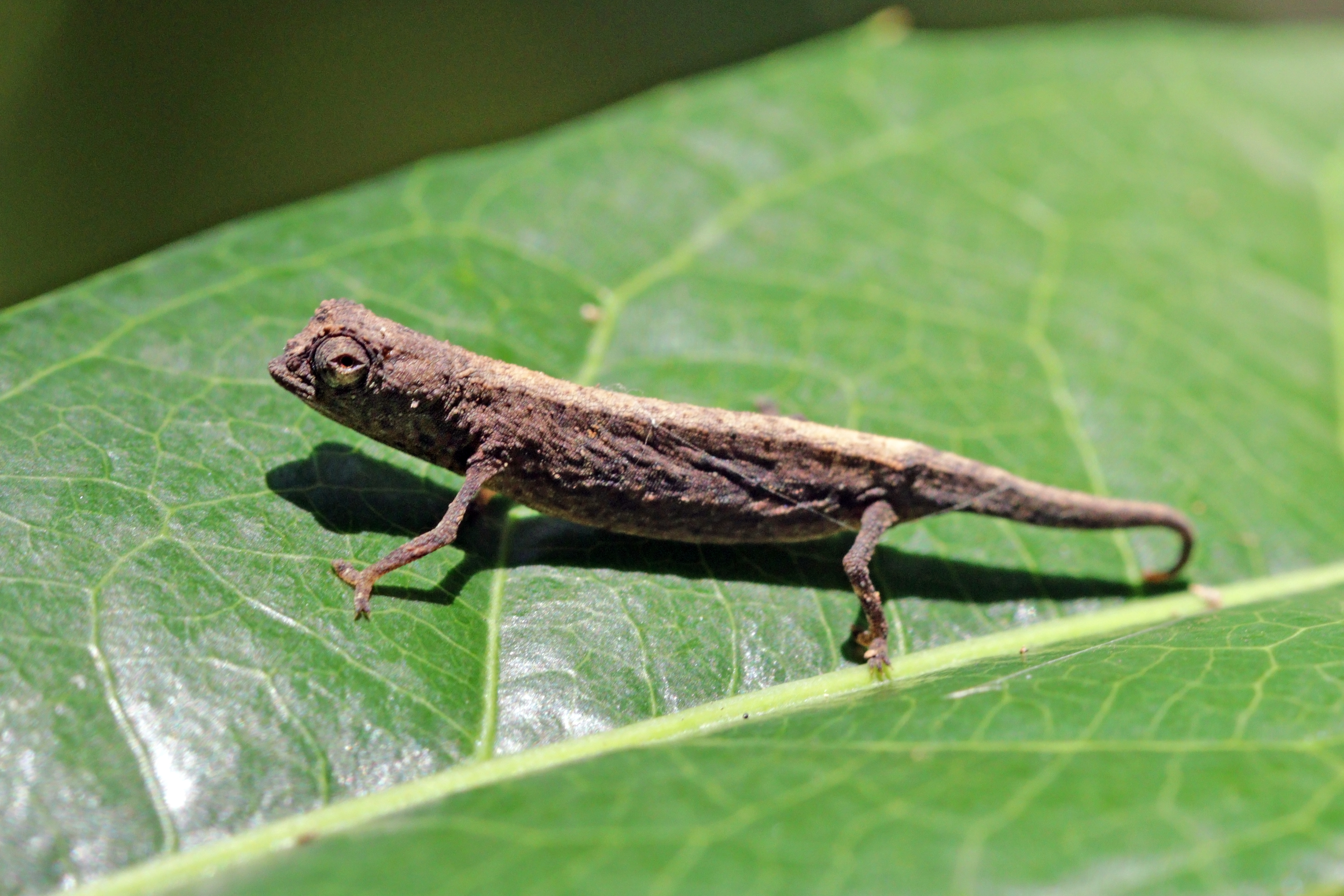
Brookesia minima, Lokobe Strict Reserve. The 30 species of chameleons in the genus Brookesia are tiny, usually brown-coloured and mainly terrestrial.

Chameleons primarily live in the mainland of sub-Saharan Africa and on the island of Madagascar, although a few species live in northern Africa, southern Europe (Portugal, Spain, Italy, Greece, Cyprus and Malta), the Middle East, southeast Pakistan, India, Sri Lanka, and several smaller islands in the western Indian Ocean. Introduced, non-native populations are found in Hawaii and Florida.

Chameleons are found only in tropical and subtropical regions and inhabit all kinds of lowland and mountain forests, woodlands, shrublands, savannas, and sometimes deserts, but each species tends to be a restricted to only one of a few different habitat types. The typical chameleons from the subfamily Chamaeleoninae are arboreal, usually living in trees or bushes, although a few (notably the Namaqua chameleon) are partially or largely terrestrial. The genus Brookesia, which comprises the majority of the species in the subfamily Brookesiinae, live low in vegetation or on the ground among leaf litter. Many chameleon species have small distributions and are considered threatened. Declining chameleon numbers are mostly due to habitat loss.

== Reproduction ==
Most chameleons are oviparous, but all Bradypodion species and many Trioceros species are ovoviviparous (although some biologists prefer to avoid the term ovoviviparous because of inconsistencies with its use in some animal groups, instead just using viviparous).

The oviparous species lay eggs three to six weeks after copulation. The female will dig a hole—from 10–30 cm (4–12 in), deep depending on the species—and deposit her eggs. Clutch sizes vary greatly with species. Small Brookesia species may only lay two to four eggs, while large veiled chameleons (Chamaeleo calyptratus) have been known to lay clutches of 20–200 (veiled chameleons) and 10–40 (panther chameleons) eggs. Clutch sizes can also vary greatly among the same species. Eggs generally hatch after four to 12 months, again depending on the species. The eggs of Parson's chameleon (Calumma parsoni) typically take 400 to 660 days to hatch.

Chameleons lay flexible-shelled eggs which are affected by environmental characteristics during incubation. The egg mass is the most important in differentiating survivors of Chameleon during incubation. An increase in egg mass will depend on temperature and water potential. To understand the dynamics of water potential in Chameleon eggs, the consideration of exerted pressure on eggshells will be essential because the pressure of eggshells play an important role in the water relation of eggs during entire incubation period.

The ovoviviparous species, such as the Jackson's chameleon (Trioceros jacksonii) have a five- to seven-month gestation period. Each young chameleon is born within the sticky transparent membrane of its yolk sac. The mother presses each egg onto a branch, where it sticks. The membrane bursts and the newly hatched chameleon frees itself and climbs away to hunt for itself and hide from predators. The female can have up to 30 live young from one gestation.

== Diet ==
Chameleons generally eat insects, but larger species, such as the common chameleon, may also take other lizards and young birds. The range of diets can be seen from the following examples:

- The veiled chameleon, Chamaeleo calyptratus from Arabia, is insectivorous, but eats leaves when other sources of water are not available. It can be maintained on a diet of crickets. They can eat as many as 15–50 large crickets a day.
- Jackson's chameleon (Trioceros jacksonii) from Kenya and northern Tanzania eat a wide variety of small animals including ants, butterflies, caterpillars, snails, worms, lizards, geckos, amphibians, and other chameleons, as well as plant material, such as leaves, tender shoots, and berries. It can be maintained on a mixed diet including kale, dandelion leaves, lettuce, bananas, tomatoes, apples, crickets, and waxworms.
- The common chameleon of Europe, North Africa, and the Near East, Chamaeleo chamaeleon, mainly eats wasps and mantises; such arthropods form over three-quarters of its diet. Some experts advise that the common chameleon should not be fed exclusively on crickets; these should make up no more than half the diet, with the rest a mixture of waxworms, earthworms, grasshoppers, flies, and plant materials such as green leaves, oats, and fruit.
- Some chameleons like the panther chameleon of Madagascar regulate their vitamin D3 levels, of which their insect diet is a poor source, by exposing themselves to sunlight since its UV component increases internal production.

== Anti-predator adaptations ==
Chameleons are preyed upon by a variety of other animals. Birds and snakes are the most important predators of adult chameleons. Invertebrates, especially ants, put a high predation pressure on chameleon eggs and juveniles. Chameleons are unlikely to be able to flee from predators and rely on crypsis as their primary defense. Chameleons can change both their colours and their patterns (to varying extents) to resemble their surroundings or disrupt the body outline and remain hidden from a potential enemy's sight. Only when detected do chameleons actively defend themselves. They adopt a defensive body posture, present an attacker with a laterally flattened body to appear larger, warn with an open mouth, and, if needed, utilize feet and jaws to fight back. Vocalization is sometimes incorporated into threat displays.

(video) Chameleon in Malawi

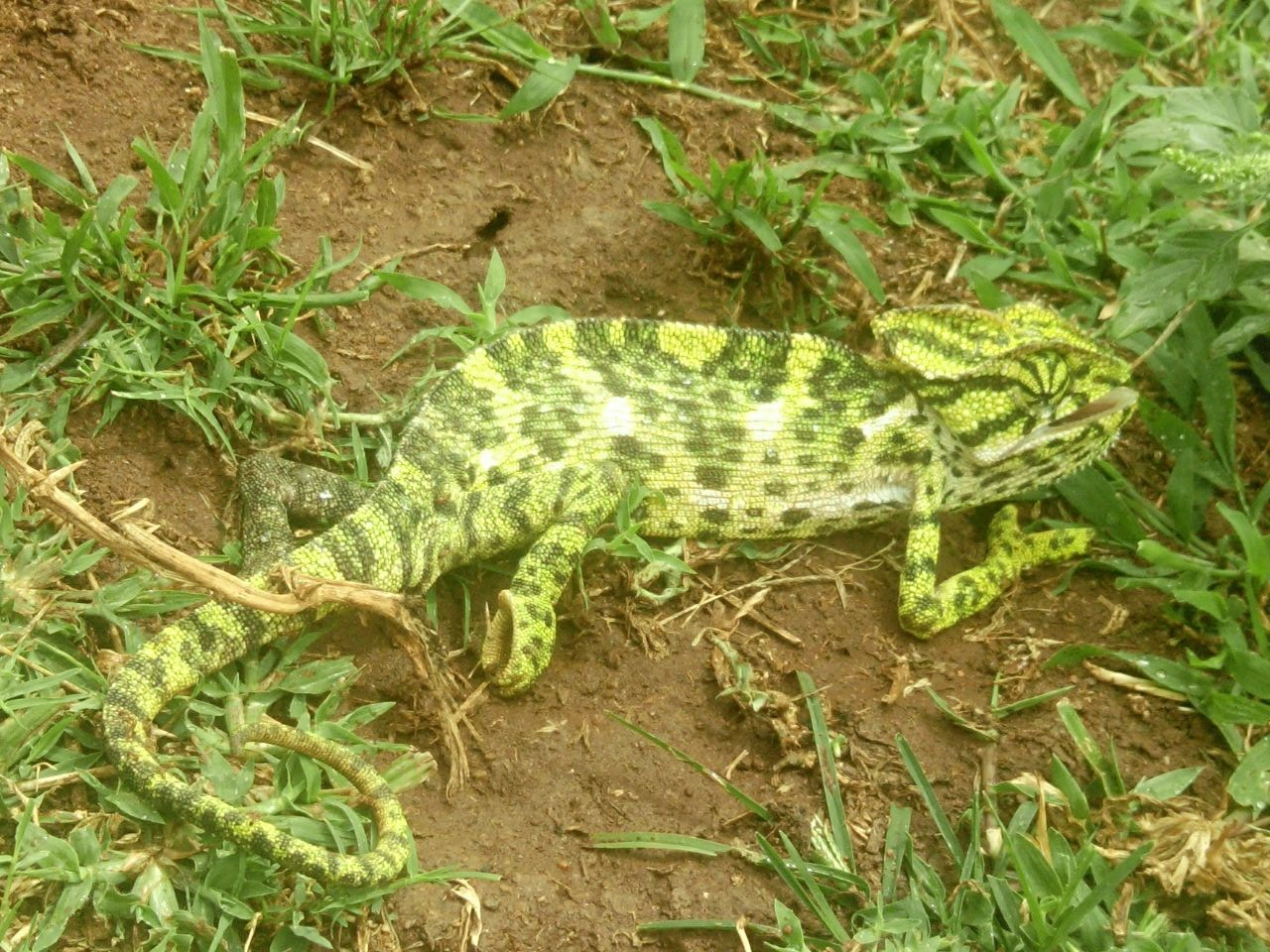
Chameleon found in Mysore, Southern India

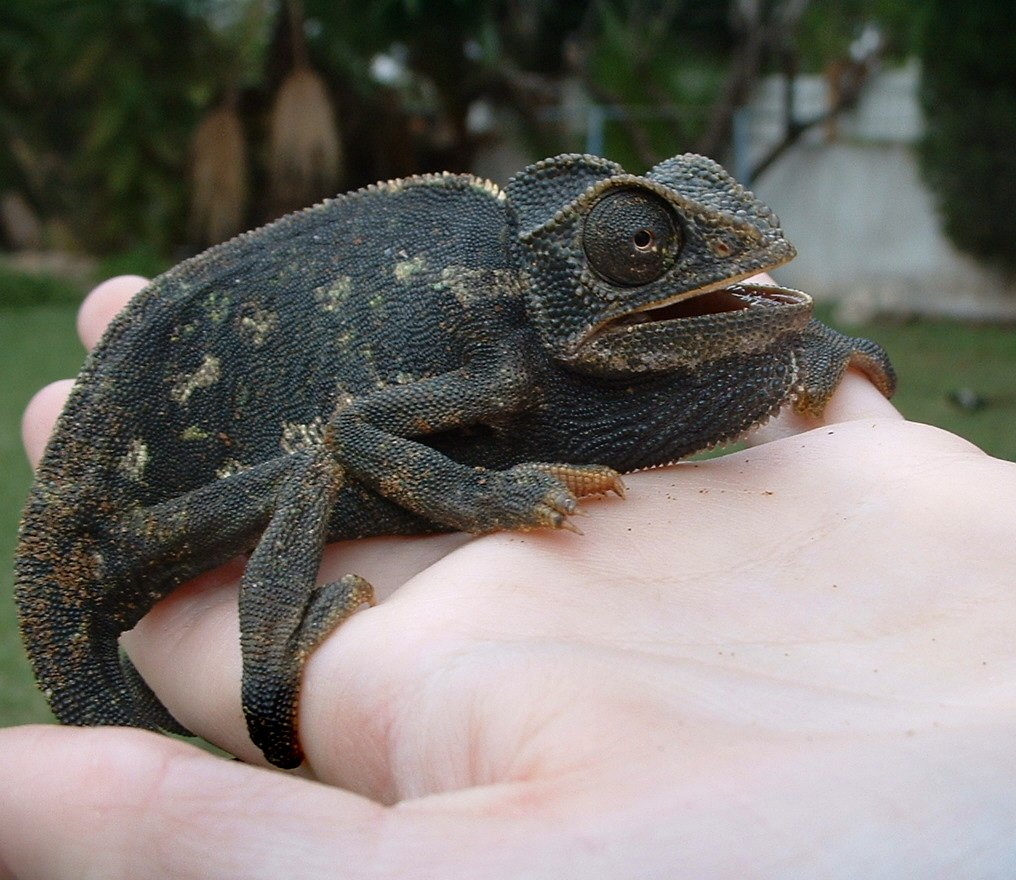
A frightened common chameleon (Chamaeleo chamaeleon) turned black.

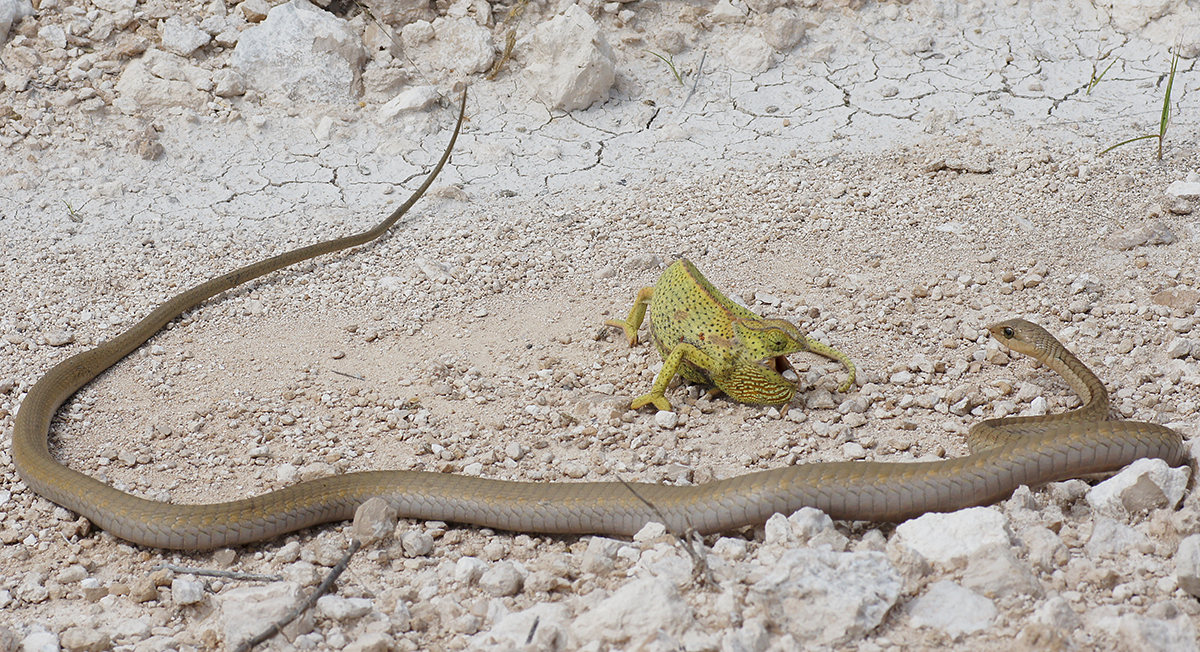
A flap-necked chameleon, Chamaeleo dilepis, attacked by a boomslang while crossing a road in Namibia adopts a threatening defense posture.

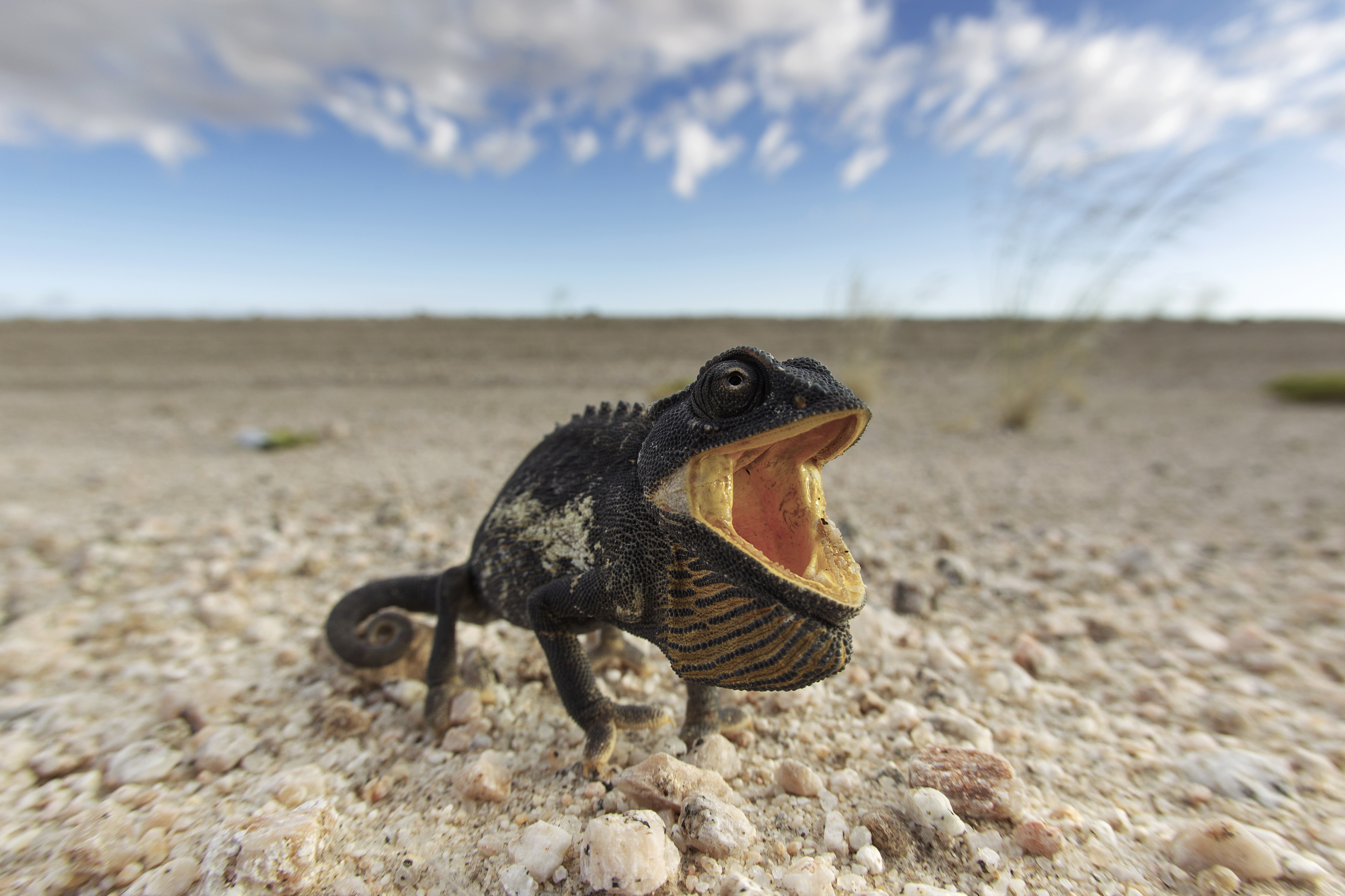
Namaqua chameleon in threat display, Namib-Naukluft National Park, turned black and opened its mouth when an attempt was made to move it off a busy road.

== Parasites ==
Chameleons are parasitized by nematode worms, including threadworms (Filarioidea). Threadworms can be transmitted by biting insects such as ticks and mosquitoes. Other roundworms are transmitted through food contaminated with roundworm eggs; the larvae burrow through the wall of the intestine into the bloodstream.

Chameleons are subject to several protozoan parasites, such as Plasmodium, which causes malaria, Trypanosoma, which causes sleeping sickness, and Leishmania, which causes leishmaniasis.

Chameleons are subject to parasitism by coccidia, including species of the genera Choleoeimeria, Eimeria, and Isospora.

== As pets ==
Chameleons are popular reptile pets, mostly imported from African countries like Madagascar, Tanzania, and Togo. The most common in the trade are the Senegal chameleon (Chamaeleo senegalensis), the Yemen or veiled chameleon (Chamaeleo calyptratus), the panther chameleon (Furcifer pardalis), and Jackson's chameleon (Trioceros jacksonii). Other chameleons seen in captivity (albeit on an irregular basis) include such species as the carpet chameleon (Furcifer lateralis), Meller's chameleon (Trioceros melleri), Parson's chameleon (Calumma parsonii), and several species of pygmy and leaf-tailed chameleons, mostly of the genera Brookesia, Rhampholeon, or Rieppeleon. These are among the most sensitive reptiles one can own, requiring specialized attention and care.

The U.S. has been the main importer of chameleons since the early 1980s accounting for 69% of African reptile exports. However, there have been large declines due to tougher regulations to protect species from being taken from the wild and due to many becoming invasive in places like Florida. They have remained popular though which may be due to the captive-breeding in the U.S. which has increased to the point that the U.S. can fulfill its demand, and has now even become a major exporter as well. In the U.S. they are so popular, that despite Florida having six invasive chameleon species due to the pet trade, reptile hobbyists in these areas search for chameleons to keep as pets or to breed and sell them, with some selling for up to a thousand dollars.

== Historical understandings ==
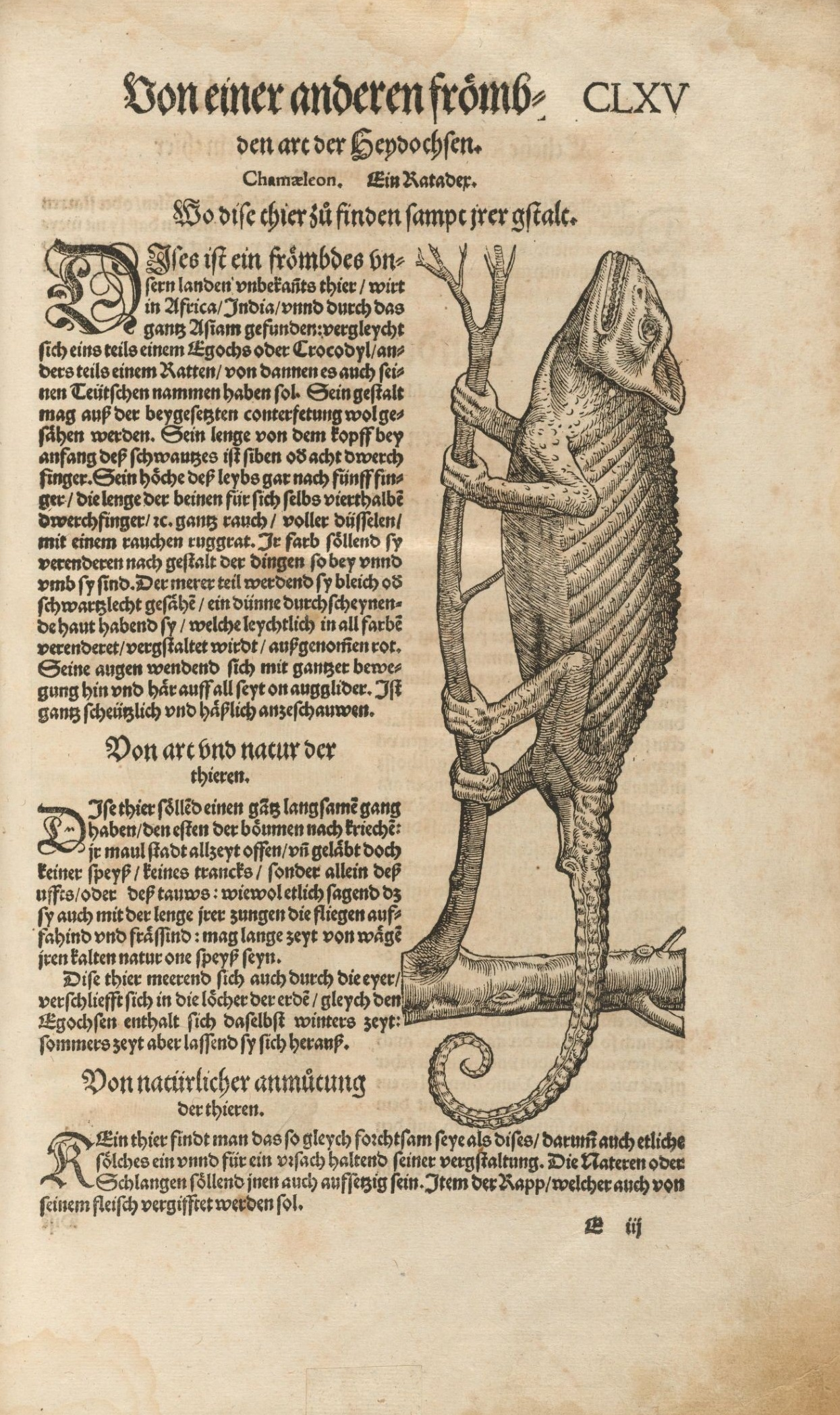
Chameleon in a German translation of Gessner's book (1563)

Aristotle (4th century BC) describes chameleons in his History of Animals. Pliny the Elder (1st century AD) also discusses chameleons in his Natural History, noting their ability to change colour for camouflage.

The chameleon was featured in Conrad Gessner's Historia animalium (1563), copied from De aquatilibus (1553) by Pierre Belon.

In Shakespeare's Hamlet, the eponymous Prince says "Excellent, i' faith, of the chameleon's dish. I eat the air, promise-crammed." Likewise, a character in Two Gentlemen of Verona refers to "the chameleon Love [that] can feed on the air." These reflect the Elizabethan belief that chameleons were able to live without sustenance. Their dissembling abilities were also recognized by Shakespeare, who in Henry VI part 3 has Richard III boast in a soliloquy that he "can add colours to the chameleon." The same talent is also referenced in Two Gentlemen of Verona.

== General bibliography ==
- Le Berre, François; Bartlett, Richard D. (2009). The Chameleon Handbook. Barron's Educational Series. 3rd Edition. ISBN 0764141422.
