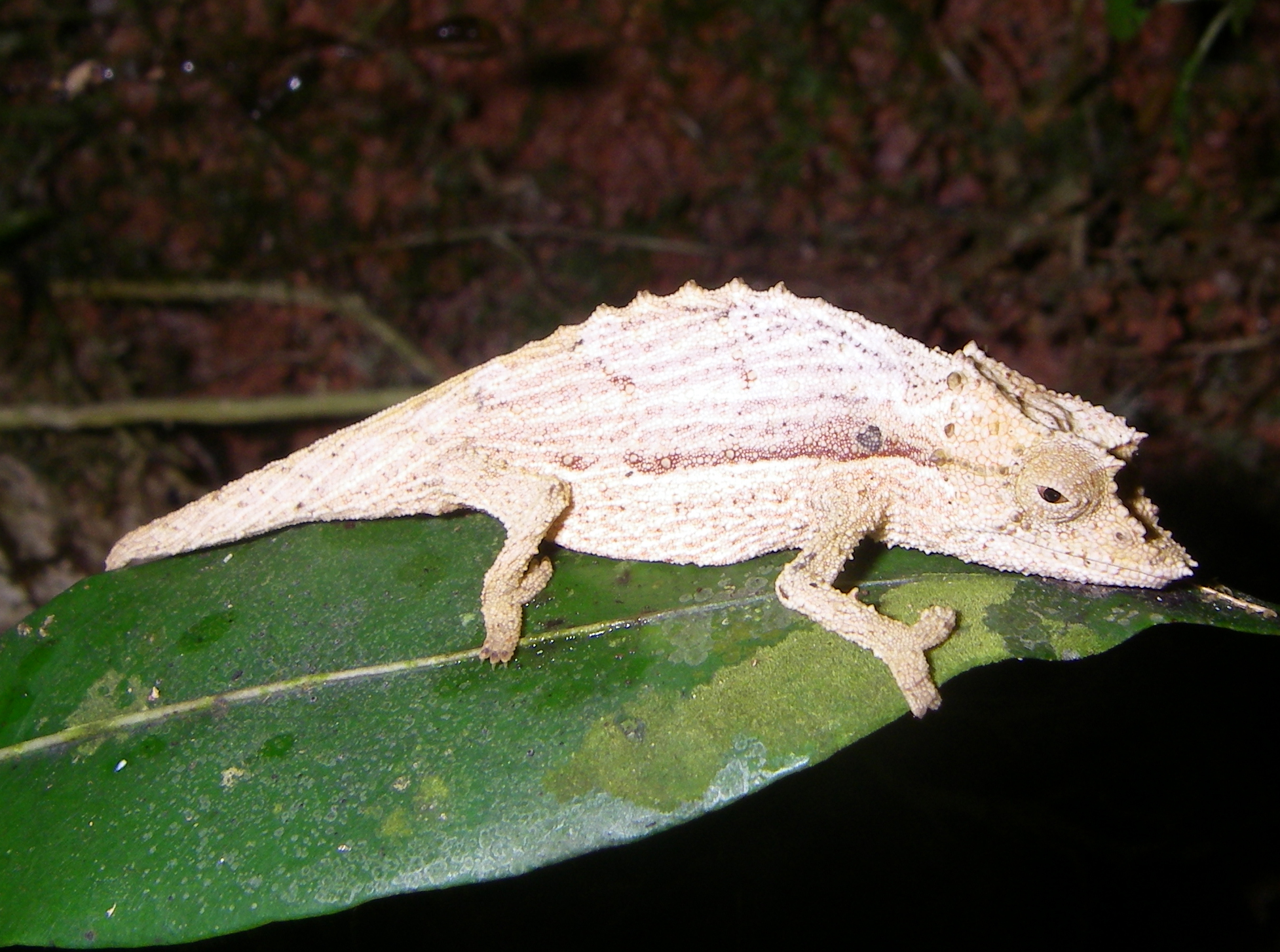
- Palleon nasus

Scientific classification
- Kingdom: Animalia
- Phylum: Chordata
- Class: Reptilia
- Order: Squamata
- Suborder: Iguania
- Family: Chamaeleonidae
- Genus: Palleon; Glaw, Hawlitschek & Ruthensteiner, 2013

Type species
- Brookesia nasus Boulenger, 1887

Diversity
- 2 species

= Palleon =

Genus of lizards

Palleon is a genus of small chameleons erected in 2013 for a small clade formerly assigned to the genus Brookesia. The species of Palleon are endemic to Madagascar.

== Species ==
- Palleon lolontany Raxworthy & Nussbaum, 1995
- Palleon nasus (Boulenger, 1887) – elongate leaf chameleon
  - Palleon nasus nasus
  - Palleon nasus pauliani
