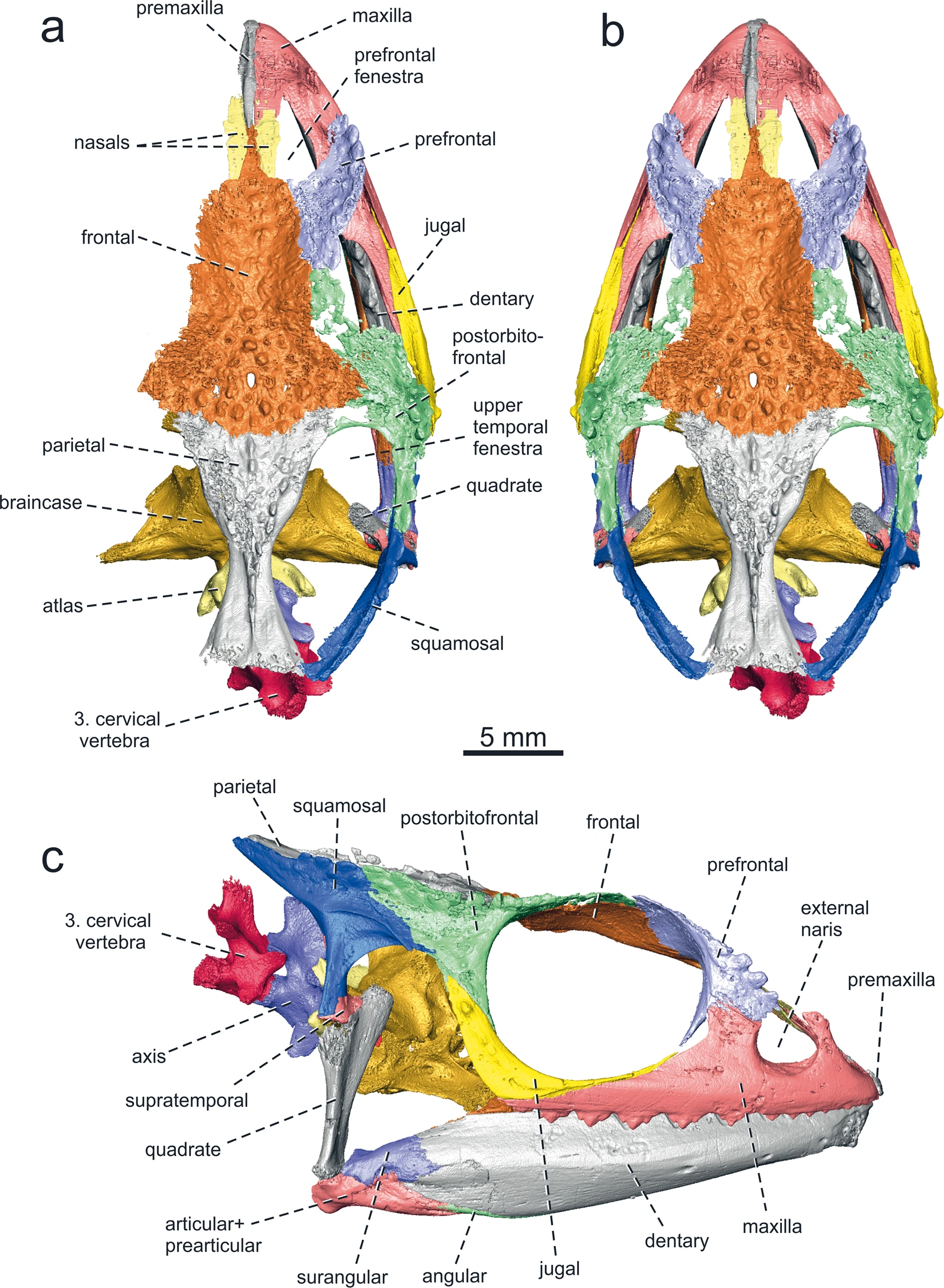

Scientific classification
- Kingdom: Animalia
- Phylum: Chordata
- Class: Reptilia
- Order: Squamata
- Suborder: Iguania
- Family: Chamaeleonidae
- Genus: Calumma
- Species: †C. benovskyi

Binomial name
- †Calumma benovskyi Čerňanský et al., 2020

= Calumma benovskyi =

Calumma benovskyi Temporal range: Early Miocene

Extinct species of chameleon

Calumma benovskyi is an extinct species of chameleon of the Calumma genus. While species of this genus are only found on Madagascar today, C. benovskyi was discovered in the Miocene sediments of Kenya. This indicates that the genus and even chameleons as a whole did not originate on Madagascar, as often held previously, but on continental Africa. This matches with several prior studies that favor an African origin of the group both based on phylogenetic results and the ocean currents present between Africa and Madagascar during much of the Paleogene and Neogene. Additionally, since C. benovskyi was found to be a rather derived member of its genus, this would necessitate a much greater, as of yet unknown diversity of chameleons from the Oligocene and Miocene of Africa.

== History and naming ==
The fossil material of Calumma benovskyi was discovered by Alan Walker in the Miocene sediments of the Kenyan Hiwegi Formation of Rusinga Island. The type specimen (KNM-RU 18340), a complete skull with attached mandible and the first three neck vertebrae, was then preliminarily described by Rieppel, Walker and Odhiambo on the basis of a cast and photographs in 1992. Although already noting similarities to Calumma, the researchers assigned the material to an early species of the genus Rhampholeon. Nearly 30 years later the skull was subjected to X-ray microcomputed tomography in order to reveal hidden detail and virtually prepare the material, which is still filled with matrix. During the course of this study, the authors reevaluated the taxonomic position of the material, instead finding it to be placed in Calumnm and establishing a new species.

The species is named after Maurice Benyovszky, a military officer and traveler born in Vrbové, Slovakia. Benyovszky made several travels to Madagascar, which Čerňanský and colleagues liken to the fact that Calumma represents a genus "born" abroad that later traveled to the island.

== Description ==
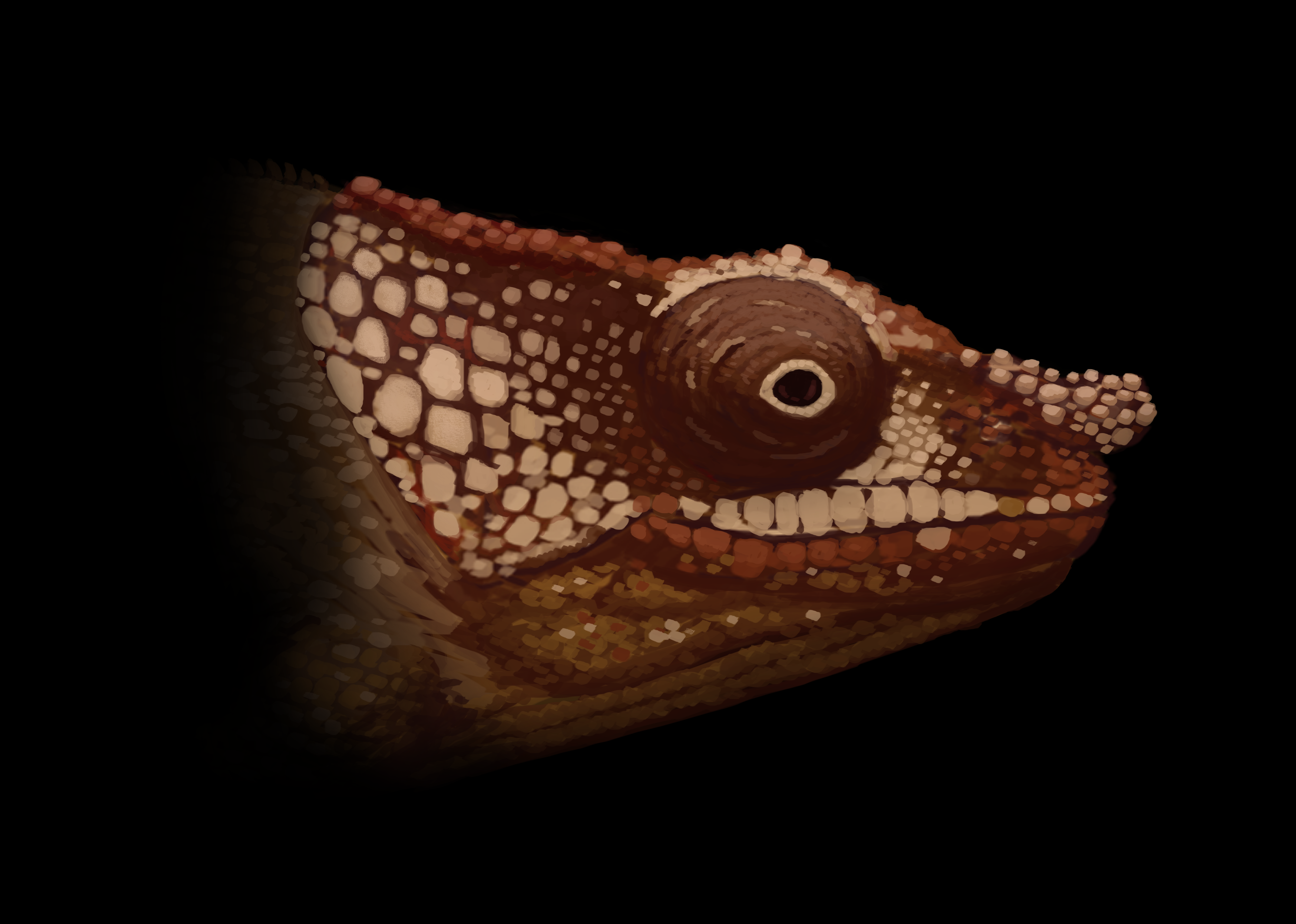
Paleoart reconstruction of Calumma benovskyi.

C. benovskyi is differentiated from all other Calumma species by the shape of the frontal bone, which forms well-developed triangular processes towards the back of this element. It further differs through the combination of various other anatomical details of the skull, like the fact that the frontal contacts the nasal bone. A prefrontal fenestra is present and is connected with the external nares, forming a single skull opening. The prefrontal contacts the postorbitofrontal, preventing the frontal bone from contributing to the margins of the orbits. When the skull is viewed from above, the prefrontals incline towards the side and the parietal bone shows a characteristic hourglass shape. The protuberances located on the parietal are arranged in a pattern resembling the Greek letter Ψ (psi). These protuberances continue onto the frontal, where they are more evenly distributed. The jugal is lined with only a single line of protuberances. Between the sculpting of the surface, the back third of the parietal is additionally fully pierced by the pineal eye. The inward-facing edge of the orbits are concave rather than straight. The back of the postorbitofrontal is elevated above the eyes, putting the supratemporal fenestrae into a horizontal position and rendering them invisible in profile view. Continuing on towards the squamosal bone, this element is relatively horizontal rather than vertical. In general the skull reaches its greatest width in the area where the frontal and parietal bones meet, after which the skull narrows again giving it an oval shape. In profile view the skull is roughly triangular, with a tapering snout and a flat casque, the later of which confined to the region behind the large eyesockets.

Some of these traits are variable among species within the genus Calumma. For instance, the jugal of both Calumma ambreense and Parson's chameleon feature two rows of protuberances, while the short-horned chameleon shares a single row with C. benovskyi. The connection between prefrontal fenestra and naris also varies between species and genera, present in the big-nosed chameleon, deceptive chameleon and the giant one-horned chameleon, but absent in the flat-casqued chameleon, short-horned chameleon and the genera Chamaeleo and Furcifer. The same applies to many of the other features observed in Calumma benovskyi, rendering the specific combination diagnostic to the species.

== Phylogeny ==
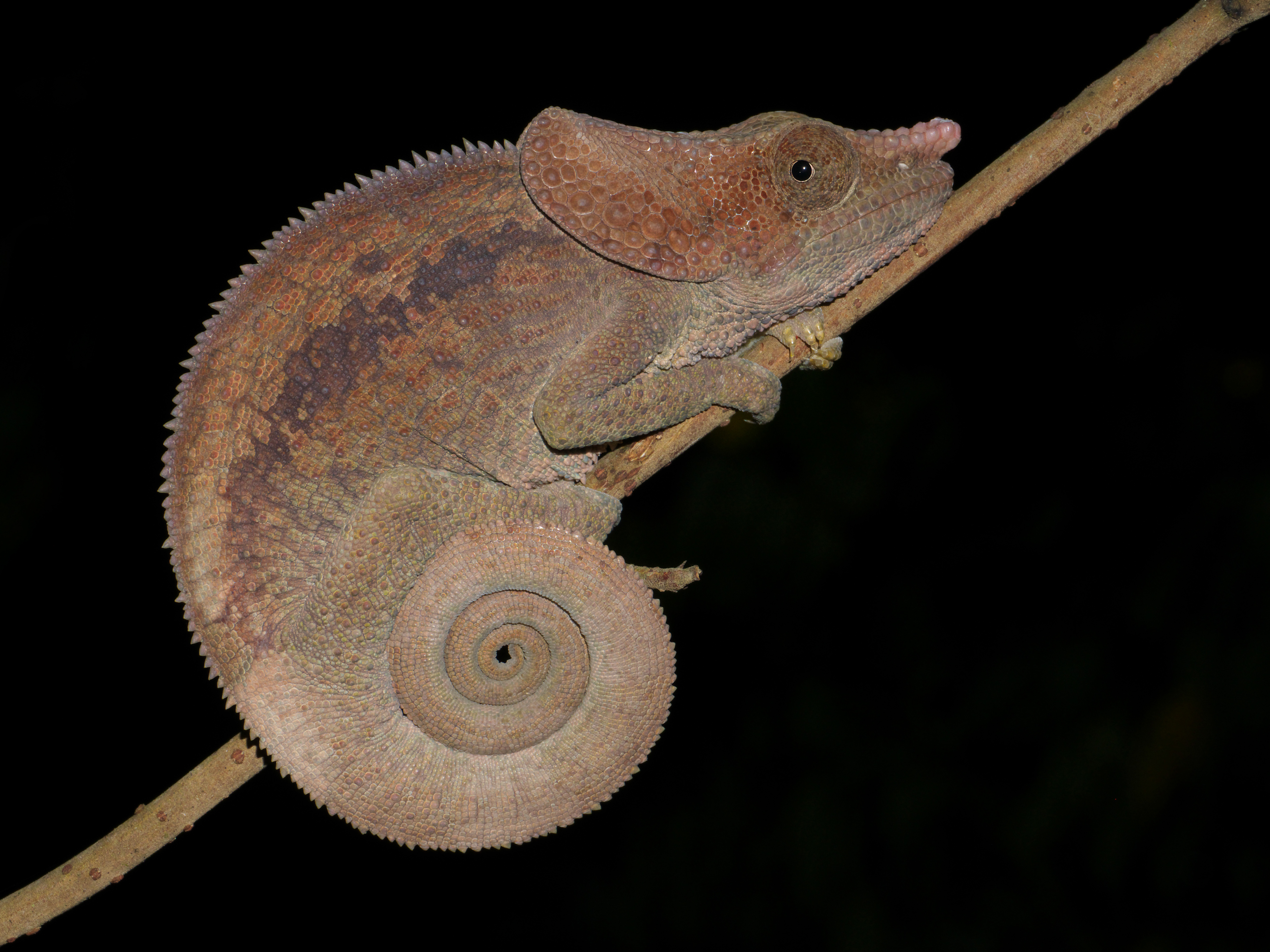
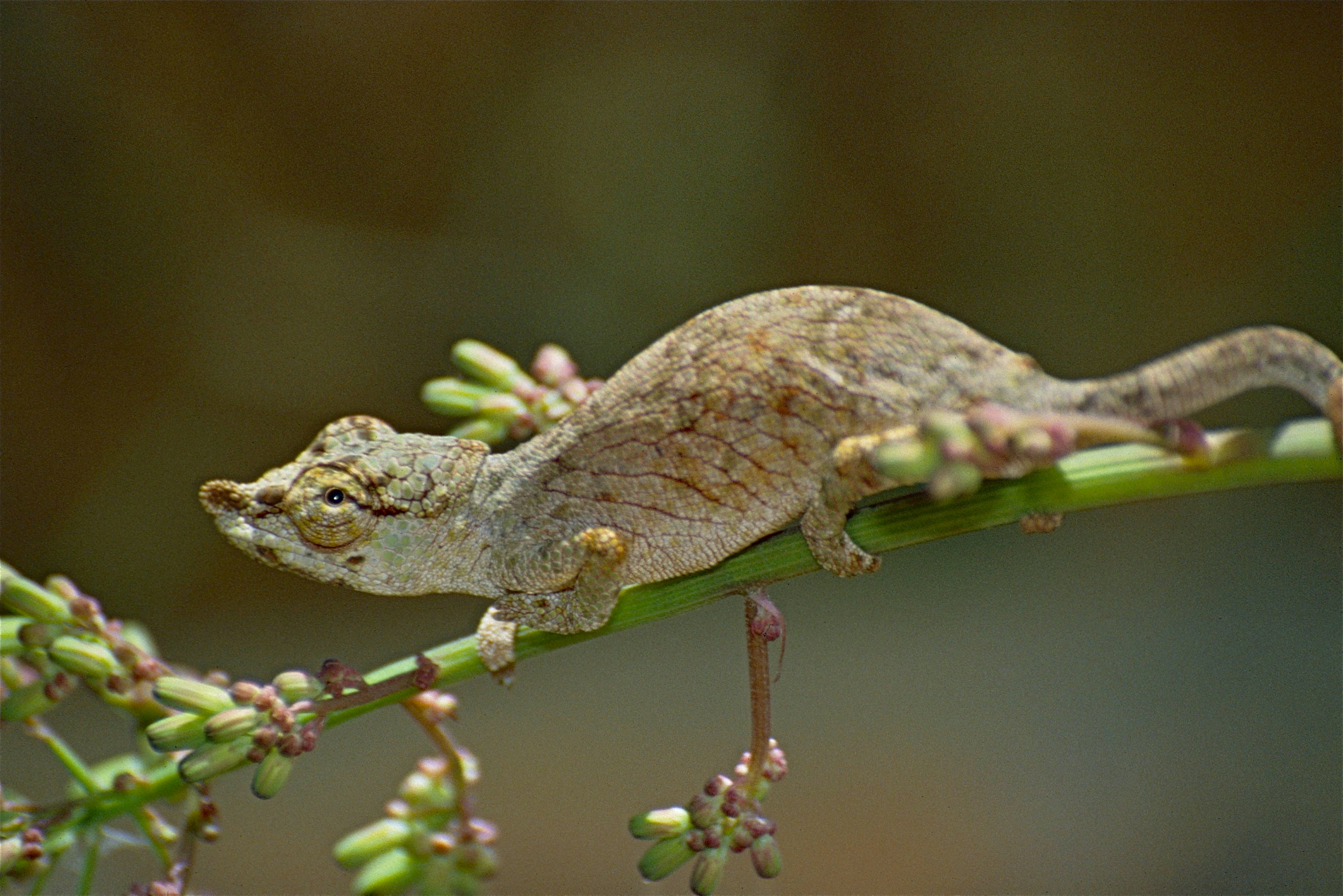
Depending on the phylogenetic analysis conducted, the short-horned chameleon or the big-nosed chameleon may be the closest relatives to C. bnovskyi

Multiple phylogenetic analysis were performed using the data gathered from the holotype of Calumma benovskyi, all of which finding the species to be nested deep within the genus Calumma. The initial two analysis recovered the same topology, placing the Miocene species as the sister taxon to the short-horned chameleon and finding the big-nosed chameleon as a sister taxon to Calumma and Bradypodion, possibly due to its small size affecting its skull morphology. A third analysis utilized a prior molecular phylogeny recovered by Tolley et al. to constrain the ingroup, producing slightly different results. While C. benovskyi was still found to be a clear member of Calumma, this analysis found it to be the sister taxon of the long-nosed chameleon, with the short-horned chameleon as a sister to both these species.

- - Brookesia (leaf chameleons)
  - - Rieppeleon kerstenii
    - - Rieppeleon brevicaudatus (bearded leaf chameleon)
      - - Rhampholeon (pygmy chameleons)
        - - - Calumma nasutum (big-nosed chameleon)
            - - Bradypodion (South African dwarf chameleons)
              - - Calumma parsonii (Parson's chameleon)
                - - Calumma globifer (globe-horned chameleon)
                  - - Calumma brevicorne (short-horned chameleon)
                    - †Calumma benovskyi
          - - Archaius tigris (Seychelles tiger chameleon)
            - - - Furcifer
                - Chamaeleo
              - - Kinyongia fischeri (Fischer's chameleon)
                - Trioceros

- - Brookesia (leaf chameleons)
  - - - Archaius tigris (Seychelles tiger chameleon)
      - Rieppeleon
    - - Rhampholeon (pygmy chameleons)
      - - Bradypodion (South African dwarf chameleons)
        - - Chamaeleo
          - - - Furcifer
              - - - Calumma parsonii (Parson's chameleon)
                  - Calumma globifer (globe-horned chameleon)
                - - Calumma brevicorne (short-horned chameleon)
                  - - Calumma nasutum (big-nosed chameleon)
                    - †Calumma benovskyi
            - - Kinyongia fischeri (Fischer's chameleon)
              - Trioceros

== Evolutionary importance ==
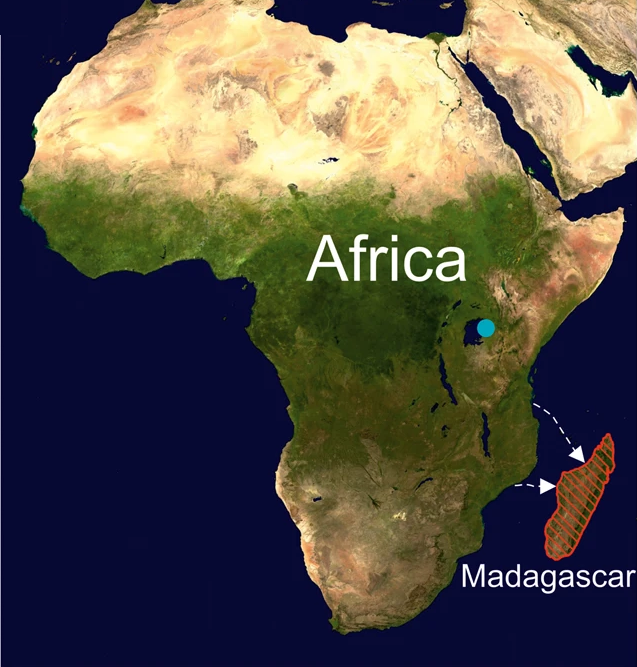
Possible routes of dispersal of the genus Calumma from continental Africa to Madagascar

Calumma benovskyi is of particular importance to understanding the evolution and dispersal of chameleons due to the fact that it is the first and only known member of Calumma found outside of Madagascar, which separated from mainland Africa during the early Cretaceous. This makes Calumma one of several groups of animals that are endemic to the island today, but appear to have had its origin on the mainland only to later disperse across the Mozambique Channel sometime during the Oligocene to Miocene. Other animals of such origin include the tenrecs and the aye-aye, both of which have relatives on the mainland and arrived through a single dispersal event.

A continental origin for Calumma is consistent with the works of Tolley et al., who suggest that rather than having originated on Madagascar and spread from there, chameleons have originated on the mainland and colonized the islands of the Indian Ocean across multiple waves. Regarding Madagascar in particular, Tolley and colleagues suggest that at least two dispersal events occurred. The first, taking place during the Paleocene, would have introduced the Brookesia lineage to the island while the later event is proposed to have taken place during the Oligocene. Such dispersal would be possible through the use of natural rafts like trees, a mode of transport especially favorable for arboreal animals like chameleons, and the presence of eastward currents that would transport such rafts from Africa to the shores of Madagascar.

Besides the mere presence of C. benoskyi, other factors also support that this genus' originated on the mainland. For instance, phylogenetic analysis finds that both Calumma and Furcifer nest in a clade that otherwise contains genera found on the mainland. However, some complications are also introduced by the presence of Calumma in Miocene Africa. Tolley and colleagues proposed that Calumma and Furcifer are sister taxa that split from one another during the Eocene, long before the appearance of Calumma benoskyi. If the sister relationship between these two genera holds true, this would mean that both must have had their origin on the continent, rather than splitting and diversifying after their dispersal to Madagascar. A further problem lies in the precise phylogenetic placement of the species. Although it is the oldest member of Calumma, C. benoskyi appears to have been a derived member of the genus and not part of the ancestral lineage. This indicates that there is a large gap in knowledge regarding the diversity of chameleons in Oligocene to Miocene Africa.

Regardless of the precise details of the dispersal, Čerňanský and colleagues agree with Tolley in supporting a continental origin of chameleons. They regard the older “out of Madagascar” hypothesis as unlikely given the early separation between the two landmasses, the lack of evidence for a significant landbridge and the fact that the currents at the time of dispersal were unfavorable for any animal to travel to the mainland, only changing direction during the middle Miocene.
