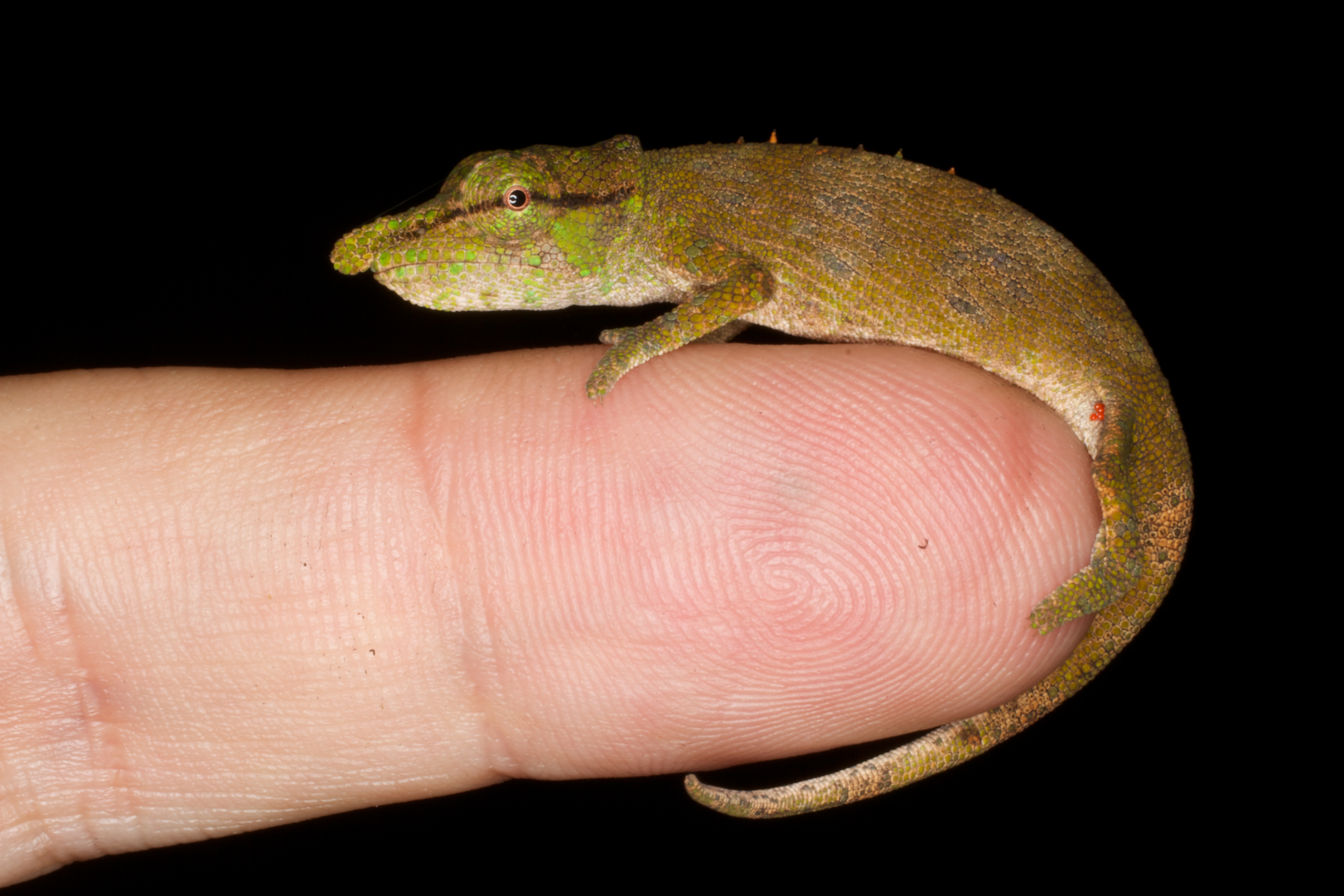
- Male
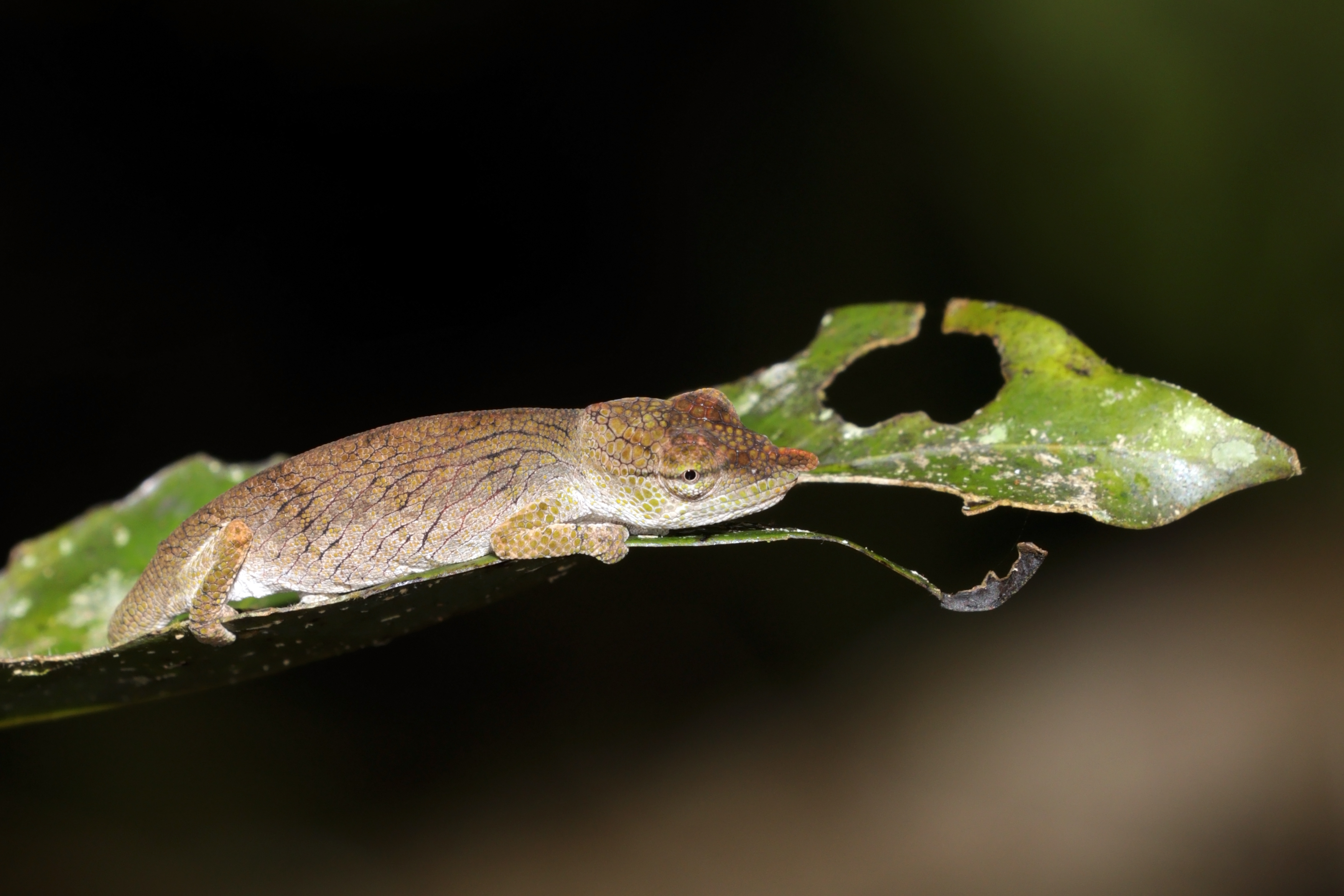
- Female in Andasibe VOIMMA reserve

Conservation status
- Least Concern (IUCN 3.1)

Scientific classification
- Kingdom: Animalia
- Phylum: Chordata
- Order: Squamata
- Suborder: Iguania
- Family: Chamaeleonidae
- Genus: Calumma
- Species: C. nasutum

Binomial name
- Calumma nasutum (Duméril & Bibron, 1836)
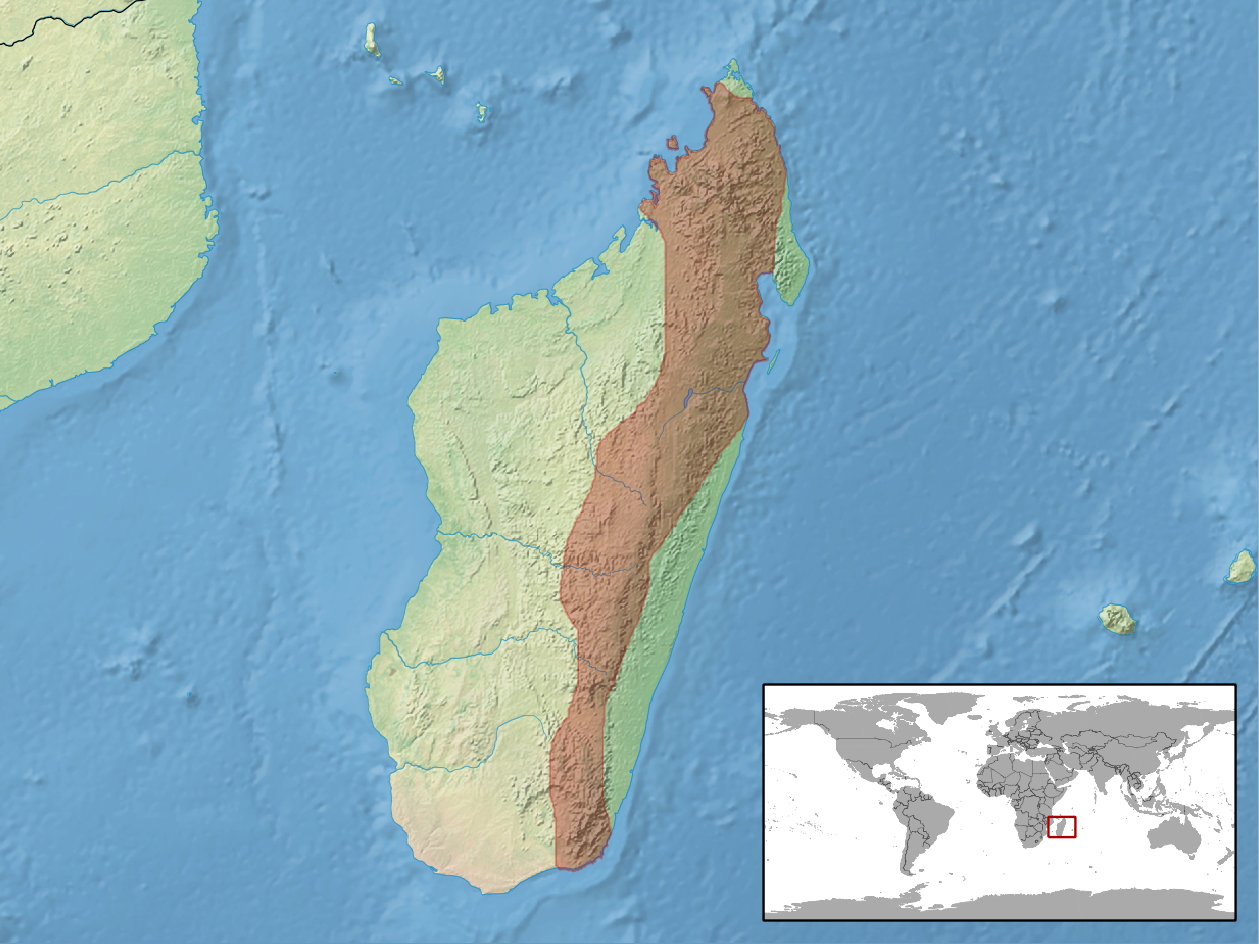

= Calumma nasutum =

Species of lizard

Calumma nasutum, the Madagascar pimple-nose chameleon, is a small species of chameleon found in Madagascar. The taxonomic identity of the species is currently uncertain and in need of revision, and this revision is likely to result in several newly described species. Several different data sets indicate that C. nasutum is a complex of several species.

== Taxonomy ==
Calumma nasutum belongs to the so-called "C. nasutum species group" within the genus Calumma. This group is a phenetic one, and has been reconstructed by some studies as being polyphyletic, but the species are unified by their small size and possession of a soft dermal appendage at the front of the nose ("rostral appendage"). The group currently consists of C. nasutum, C. fallax, C. gallus, C. vohibola, C. vatosoa, C. radamanus, C. peyrierasi, C. boettgeri, and C. linotum.

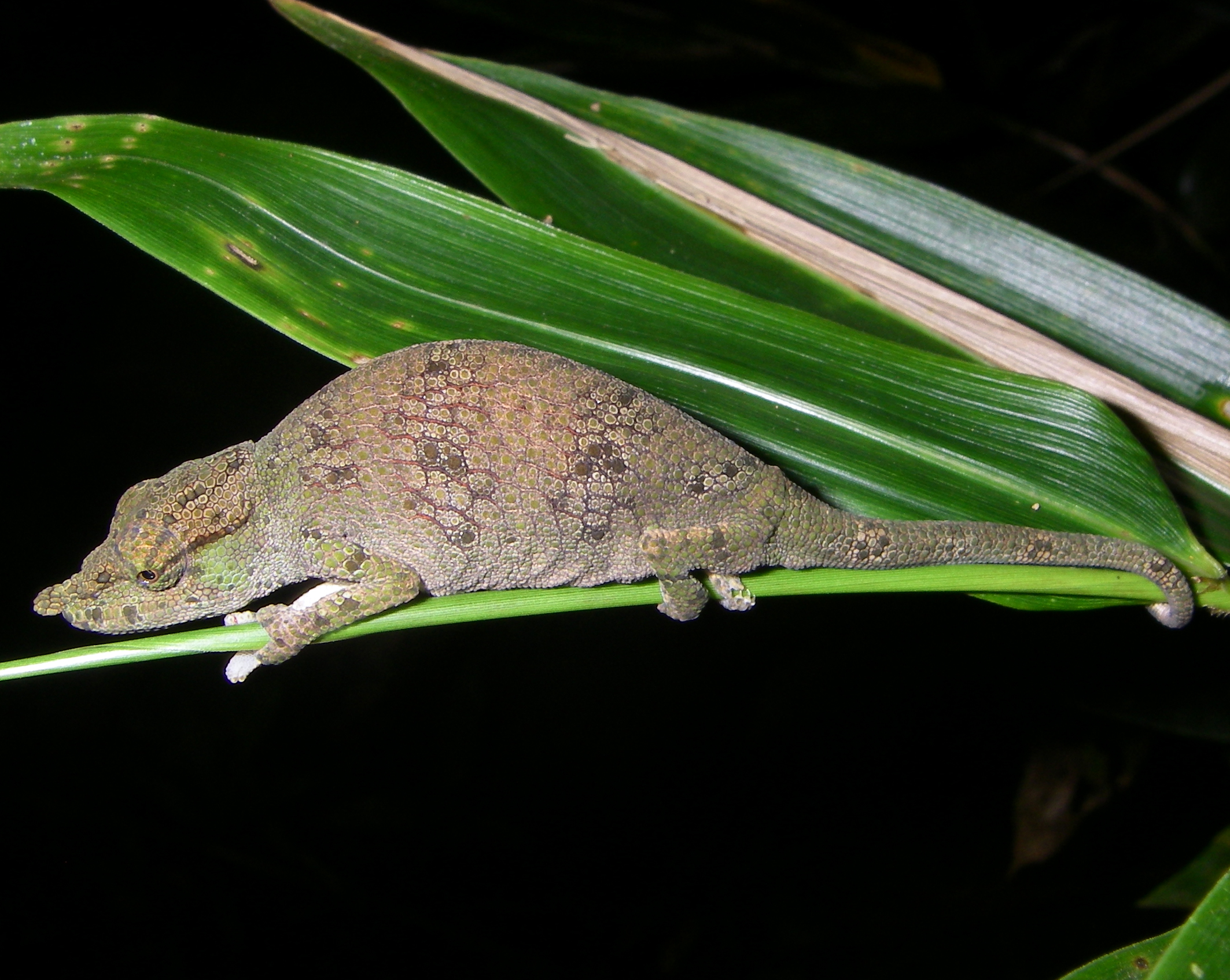
Calumma nasutum.

== Description ==
The big-nosed chameleon, which is one of the smallest arboreal chameleons usually with a total body length of 11 cm. It gets its name from the huge, paddle-like appendage that protrudes from the nasal region. It is thought that males have a larger, more square-shaped version of this flexible appendage, which is employed for identifying possible mates. The more noticeable casque, or bony head crest, is another feature that sets male big-nosed chameleons apart. Both sexes typically have brown, reddish-brown, tan, or light green skin. Females that are not interested in mating quickly acquire a stunning display of whitish-blue to turquoise dots on the sides of the nasal appendage and on top of the head. This big-nosed species has characteristics with other chameleons, such as a prehensile tail, fused toes, turret-like eyes, and an incredibly long tongue.

=== Appearance ===
The small nose-horned chameleon has a sharply pointed snout and a flexible, scale-free body covered in smooth hair. The colouration of the chameleon is generally dull, ranging from grey to brown or dull green, with dark vertical crossbars along the flanks. A white lateral band is present in some specimens. There may be yellow or blue elements, and the legs are greenish.The broad color scheme that goes from green to brown, with the darker hues being more prominent on men. Women and younger individuals have more subdued colors. Notable characteristics are absent from the wing, tail, or horn. This species is distinguished in particular by its distinct nasal appendage, which grows forward in adults.

== Conservation ==
The Convention on International Trade in Endangered Species (CITES) lists the big-nosed chameleon in Appendix II, meaning that any international trade in this species that does take place needs to be closely monitored. The government of Madagascar and other national and international conservation organizations are striving to preserve the exceptional biodiversity of this amazing island, but as of right now, no additional known conservation measures are in place exclusively for the big-nosed chameleon. However Since 80% of the native forest in Madagascar have been destroyed some conservation measures have been put in place due to the habitat loss brought on by invasive species, climate change, and deforestation.

== Habitat ==
The big-nosed chameleon inhabits primary forest, forest edge and secondary forest where it is found in low vegetation and prefer thin trees, shrubs and bushes, but also thick lianas in the dense rainforest, generally one to two meters above the ground. Only very rarely they are found in open terrain, they prefer dense foliage and deep rainforest.

== Life span ==
The life span for the Calumma nasutum chameleon is up to 5–7 years if they are healthy and not facing predation or habitat destruction.

== Behavior ==
The nose-horned chameleon is mostly an arboreal and solitary species. This species is primarily nocturnal, searching for food and mating at night. It uses its long tongue to catch prey making it an efficient way. When finding mates they have a distinct difference between male and female which is the size of their nose bumps, females tend to have a smaller bump while the males have a larger one. The remarkable defense strategy of the nose-horned chameleon is its ability to change color which not all chameleons can do, which helps it blend in with the surrounding flora and increases its chances of survival. Chameleons are generally solitary and move about on slender branches and twigs, gripping with their fused toes. The prehensile tail provides an additional 'hand' on this precarious walkway as they scan the surrounding area with their independently mobile eyes for small insect prey.

== Sleeping behaviors ==
When sleeping or resting, the big-nosed chameleon is said to position itself head downwards as it clings to a narrow twig or vine.

== Breeding behaviors ==
C. natsutum reproduce by sexual reproduction, it has been observed that female big-nosed chameleons kept in captivity lay multiple batches of two to six eggs annually. These eggs are incubated at a temperature of roughly 23 degrees Celsius for approximately 90 days.

== Diet ==
The main source of food for the nose-horned chameleon is tiny invertebrates, especially insects. It uses a clever sit-and-wait tactic to ambush victims like spiders, crickets, and roaches.

== Major threats ==
This species is impacted by the destruction and loss of humid forests brought about by slash-and-burn agriculture, and its resulting fire damage may cause localized declines in population density. Despite having a wide range, the big-nosed chameleon's low densities in some locations suggest that some populations may be vulnerable to challenges, such as habitat degradation that affects many areas of Madagascar.

=== Captivity ===
The international pet trade is not seen to be a threat to the big-nosed chameleon, unlike many other chameleon species, while some reports suggest that the trade in this species is gradually expanding.
