= Redspot barb =

Scientific classification
- Kingdom: Animalia
- Phylum: Chordata
- Class: Actinopterygii
- Order: Cypriniformes
- Family: Cyprinidae
- Subfamily: Smiliogastrinae
- Genus: Enteromius
- Species: E. kerstenii

Binomial name
- Enteromius kerstenii (W. K. H. Peters, 1868)

Synonyms
- Barbus kerstenii Peters, 1868; Labeobarbus kerstenii (Peters, 1868); Barbus salmo Pfeffer, 1896; Barbus tangandensis Jubb, 1954; Enteromius tangandensis (Jubb, 1954); Barbus akeleyi Hubbs, 1918; Barbus nigrolinea Pfeffer, 1889; Barbus lumiensis Boulenger, 1903; Barbus minchinii Boulenger, 1906

Species of fish

The redspot barb (Enteromius kerstenii) is a species of freshwater cyprinid fish found in East Africa. It is named for the large, orange-red spot found on each operculum.

According to FishBase, the South African Enteromius tangandensis (also referred to as "redsport barb") is a synonym of E. kerstenii, whereas the Catalog of Fishes lists them as separate species.

== Size ==
This species reaches a length of 9.0 cm (3.5 in).

== Etymology ==
The fish is named in honor of Otto Kersten (1839–1900), an early explorer of Mount Kilimanjaro, who sent a small collection of fishes to Peters, including the type specimen of this species.
