= Rieppeleon brachyurus =

Conservation status
- Least Concern (IUCN 3.1)
- CITES Appendix II

Scientific classification
- Kingdom: Animalia
- Phylum: Chordata
- Class: Reptilia
- Order: Squamata
- Suborder: Iguania
- Family: Chamaeleonidae
- Genus: Rieppeleon
- Species: R. brachyurus

Binomial name
- Rieppeleon brachyurus (Günther, 1893)

Synonyms
- Rhampholeon brachyurus Günther, 1893; Brookesia ionidesi Loveridge, 1951; Brookesia brachyura Loveridge, 1951; Rieppeleon brachyurus Matthee et al., 2004

Species of lizard

Rieppeleon brachyurus, known commonly as the zomba pygmy chameleon, is a species of chameleon, a lizard in the family Chamaeleonidae. The species is native to eastern and southeastern Africa.

== Geographic range ==
R. brachyurus is found in Malawi, Mozambique, and southeastern Tanzania.

== Habitat ==
The preferred natural habitats of R. brachyurus are savanna and forest, at altitudes of 100–2,300 m (330–7,550 ft).

== Description ==
The maximum recorded total length (tail included) for R. brachyurus is 54 mm (2.1 in).

== Reproduction ==
R. brachyurus is oviparous.
