= Otto Kersten =

German chemist and geographer

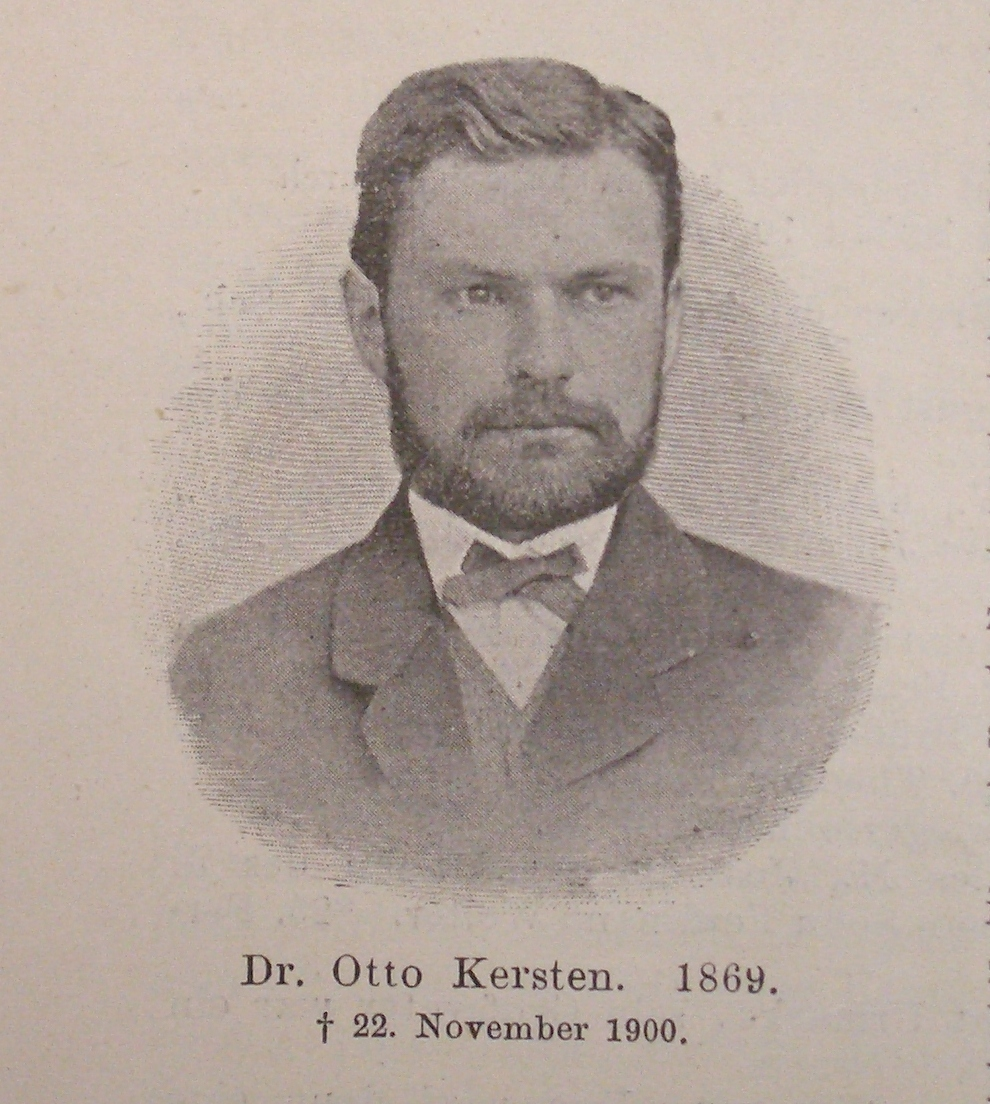
Otto Kersten (1869)

Otto Kersten (23 December 1839 in Altenburg – 22 November 1900 in Altenburg) was a German chemist and geographer.

He studied chemistry and natural sciences at the University of Leipzig, and after graduation, worked as an assistant at the vocational school in Chemnitz. In 1862 he took part in Karl Klaus von der Decken's expedition in East Africa, where the two men made a partial ascent (4280 m) of Mount Kilimanjaro. In 1863 he traveled with von der Decken to the Seychelles and the Mascarenes, and during the following year, Kersten visited Madagascar, the Comoros and Mafia Island. In 1865 he returned to Europe.

From 1870 he served at the German consulate in Jerusalem, and in 1875 became manager of a chemical factory in Berlin. In 1878, with Robert Jannasch, he founded the Zentralverein für Handelsgeographie (Central Association for Economic Geography). In 1883 he carried out economic geography research in Morocco.

In 1869–79 he published Baron Carl Claus von der Decken's Reisen in Ost-Afrika in den Jahren 1859 bis 1865 ("Decken's journeys in East Africa in 1859–65"; 4 volumes). Its editors included Wilhelm Peters, Jean Cabanis, Franz Martin Hilgendorf, Eduard von Martens, Carl Eduard Adolph Gerstaecker, Otto Finsch, Gustav Hartlaub, et al.

Animals and plants with the specific epithets of kersteni and kerstenii commemorate his name; examples being Lygodium kerstenii (a fern species), Rieppeleon kerstenii (Kenya pigmy chameleon), Pseudagrion kersteni (Kersten's sprite), and Enteromius kerstenii (redspot barb). The redspot barb, Enteromius kerstenii (W. Peters, 1868), is a species of freshwater cyprinid fish found in East Africa. Its common name refers to the large, orange-red spot found on each operculum.
