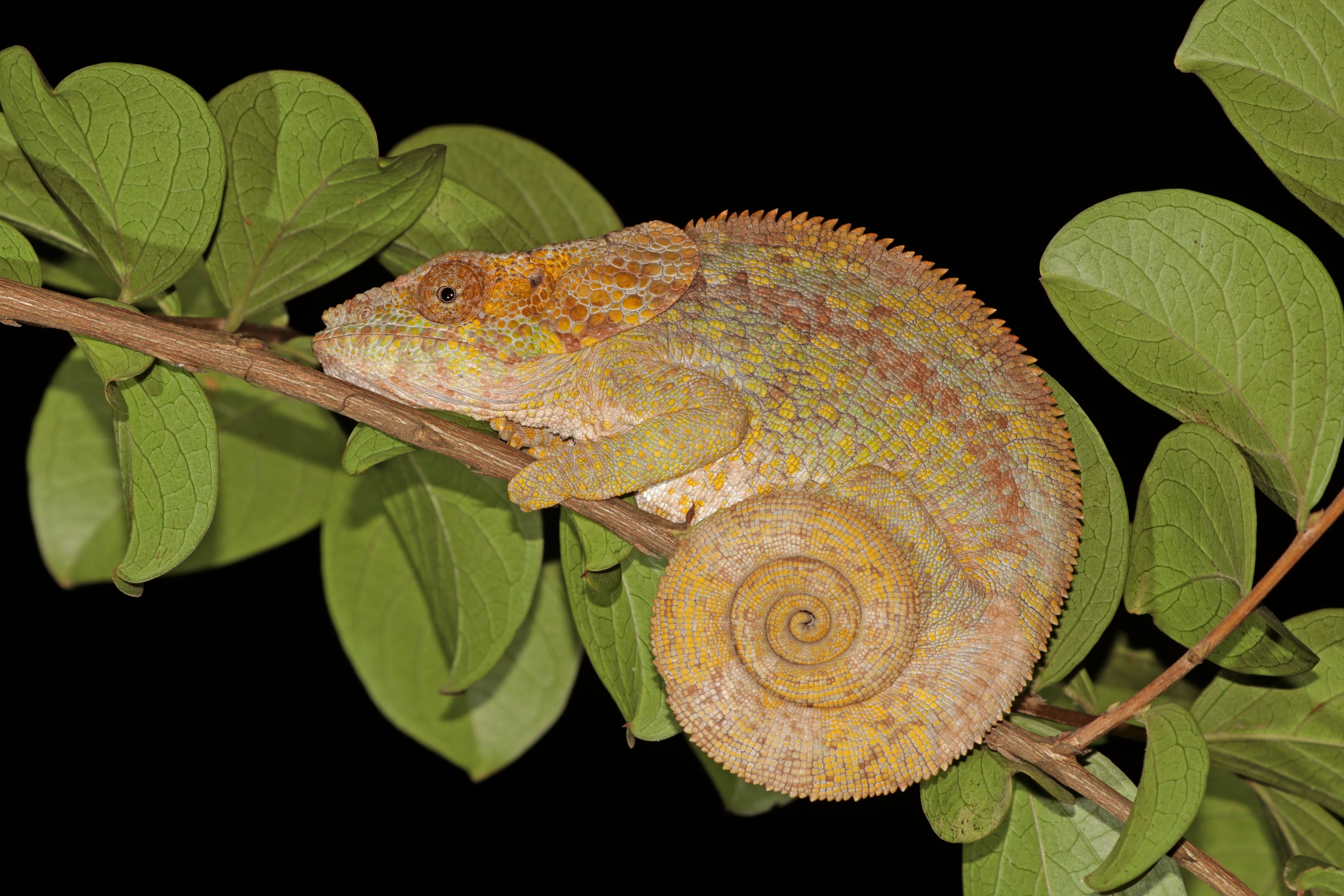
- female, Andasibe, Moramanga

Conservation status
- Least Concern (IUCN 3.1)

Scientific classification
- Kingdom: Animalia
- Phylum: Chordata
- Class: Reptilia
- Order: Squamata
- Suborder: Iguania
- Family: Chamaeleonidae
- Genus: Calumma
- Species: C. brevicorne

Binomial name
- Calumma brevicorne (Günther, 1879)
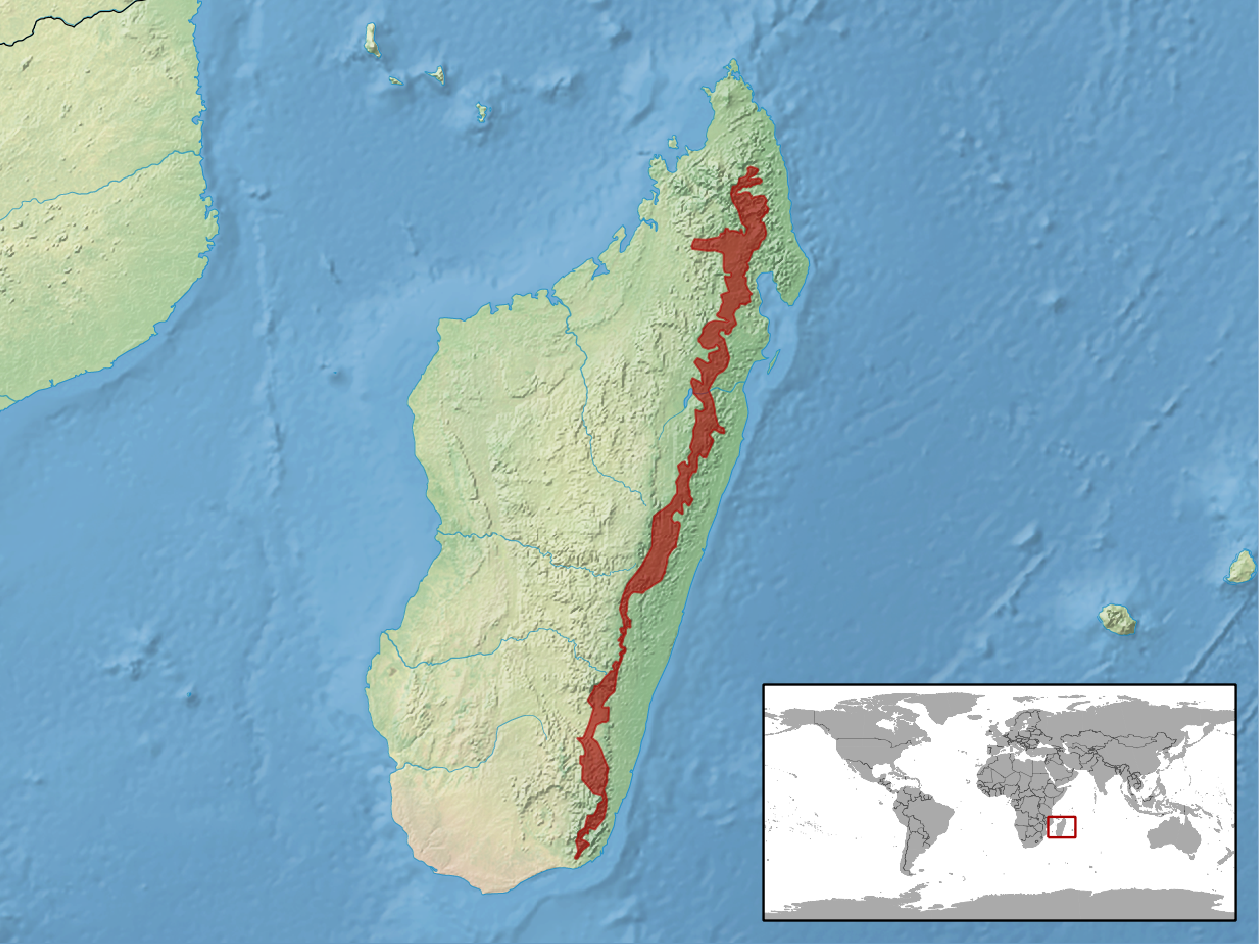

= Calumma brevicorne =

Species of lizard

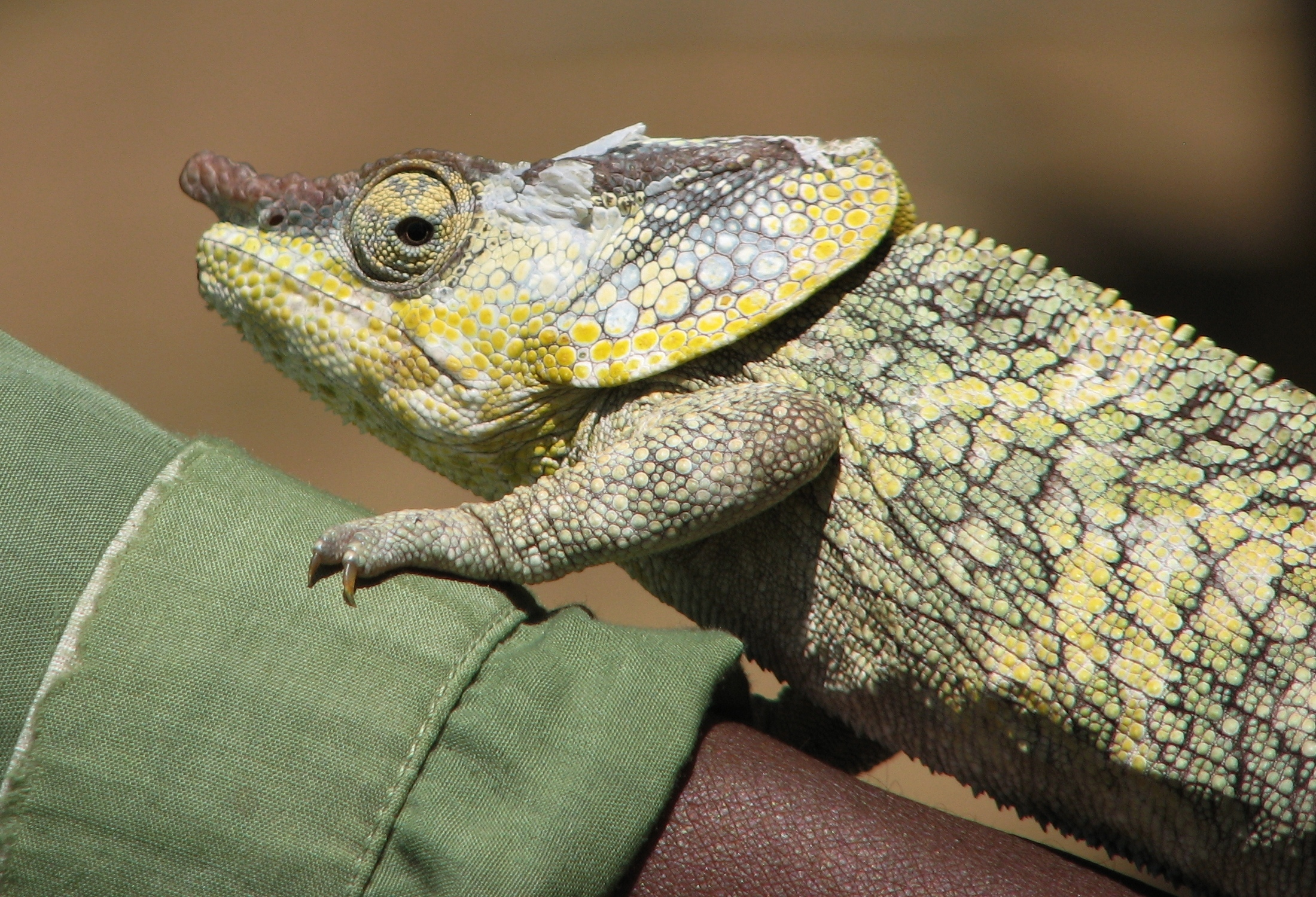

Calumma brevicorne, the short-horned chameleon, is a species of chameleon endemic to Madagascar.

== Description ==
The short-horned chameleon has a compressed body, spindly limbs, grasping feet and a prehensile tail allowing it to negotiate the branches and twigs of its arboreal habitat. The most distinctive features of the short-horned chameleon are its large, ear-like occipital lobes, and the short bony rostral appendage that projects from the snout of the male. When threatened, it raises its ear-like flaps to increase its apparent size and attacks with an open mouth. The short-horned chameleon is generally grayish in color, although there is variation between the sexes and across the species' range, with the slightly larger males having a lighter colored head, and some specimens being greener and having blue legs.

== Distribution ==
The short-horned chameleon is listed as Least Concern by the IUCN, and is calculated to have a population density of 2.4 chameleons ha^{−1} in the forests around Andasibe-Mantadia National Park and Analamazaotra Special Reserve. C. brevicornis is endemic to Madagascar and has a broad latitudinal distribution in eastern Madagascar, between the Anosy Mountains in the south and the Tsaratanana Massif in the north, and has also been confirmed from the Analavory Plateau in the northwest, within a narrow elevation band between 810 and 1,000 m. Most records of this species need to be reevaluated, and therefore its geographic range information is incomplete, however, the few verified records of this species are scattered over an area of at least 38,000 km^{2}.

== Habitat and ecology ==
This species lives within mid-altitude humid forest, where it is more commonly found in open vegetation associated with edges and disturbed areas. It is tolerant of some degree of habitat modification and has been found in agricultural land where trees are present, in roadside vegetation and in trees near buildings. Very little is known about this species' ecology, but in captivity, it is known to feed on a wide variety of insects. Females have been observed laying 10 to 30 eggs, around 40 days after mating. Calumma brevicorne eggs have been reported to be vulnerable to predation by invasive Rattus rattus.
