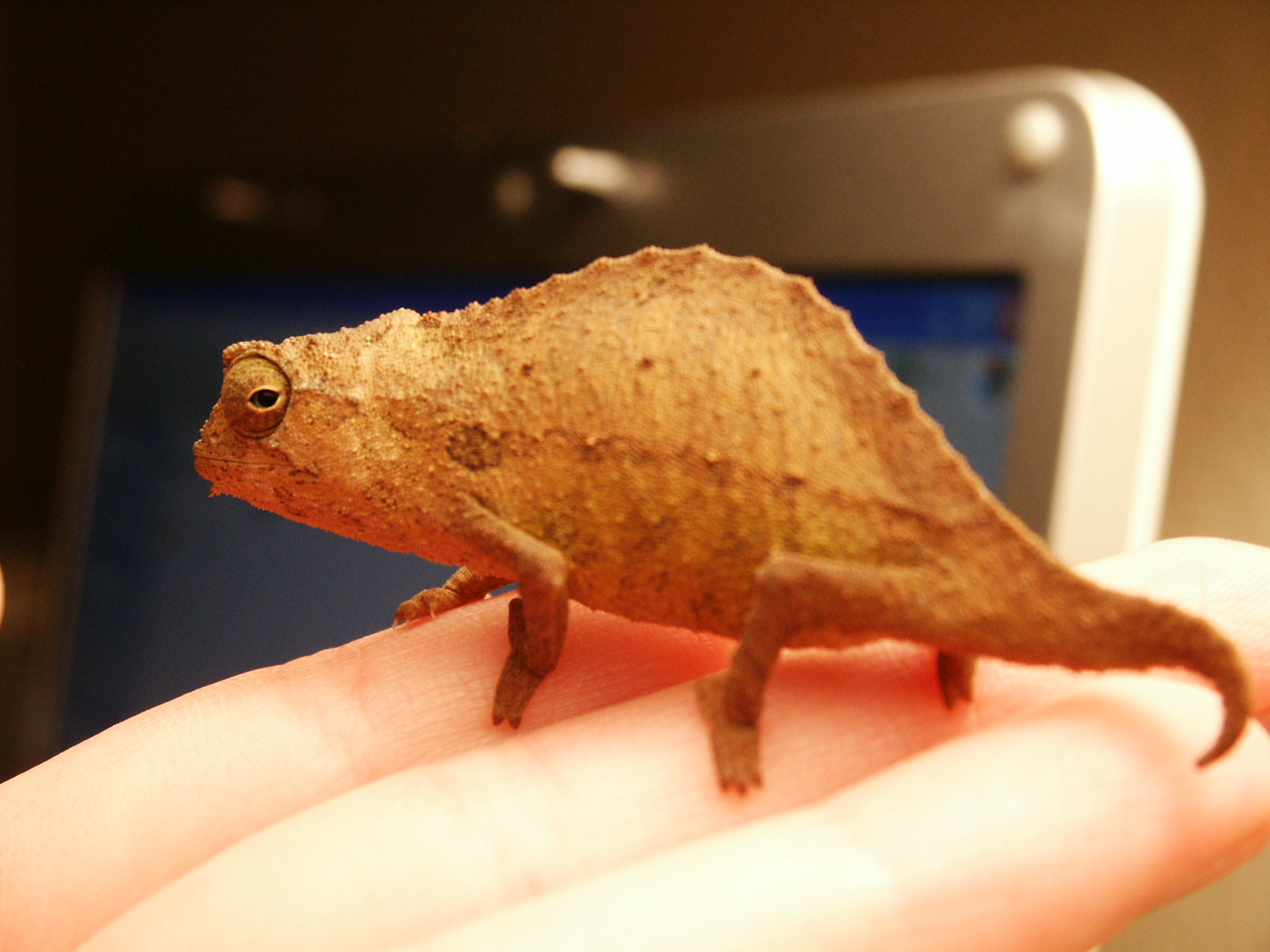

Conservation status
- Least Concern (IUCN 3.1)
- CITES Appendix II

Scientific classification
- Kingdom: Animalia
- Phylum: Chordata
- Class: Reptilia
- Order: Squamata
- Suborder: Iguania
- Family: Chamaeleonidae
- Genus: Rieppeleon
- Species: R. brevicaudatus

Binomial name
- Rieppeleon brevicaudatus (Matschie, 1892)

Synonyms
- Chamaeleon (Brookesia) brevicaudatus Matschie, 1892; Brookesia brevicaudata (Matschie, 1892); Rhampholeon brevicaudatus (Matschie, 1892)

= Rieppeleon brevicaudatus =

Species of lizard

Rieppeleon brevicaudatus, commonly known as the bearded leaf chameleon or bearded pygmy chameleon, is a chameleon originating from the eastern Usambara and Uluguru Mountains in northeastern Tanzania and Kenya. It is easily distinguished from others in the Rieppeleon genus by the presence of a "beard" below the mouth, consisting of a few raised scales. At a full grown length of only 3 in (8 cm), it is marked by somewhat drab coloring in comparison to other chameleons, usually assuming a brown or tan coloring. It is quite capable of changing its coloration, though, often taking on a shade to blend into the background and becoming darker when under stress. It is also capable of compressing its body laterally and producing a stripe down its side, mimicking a dead leaf. It often assumes this form when sleeping in the open. It can adopt a variety of colors, including yellow, green, orange, black, and brown. A common misconception is that these chameleons use their color-changing abilities as camouflage, but they actually use their color-changing skin to court and show stress or emotion. Males are distinguished by a longer tail, more prominent dorsal crest, slimmer body type, and persistent patterning. Like others in the family Chamaeleonidae, it is distinguished by independently rotating eye sockets and a tongue longer than its body.

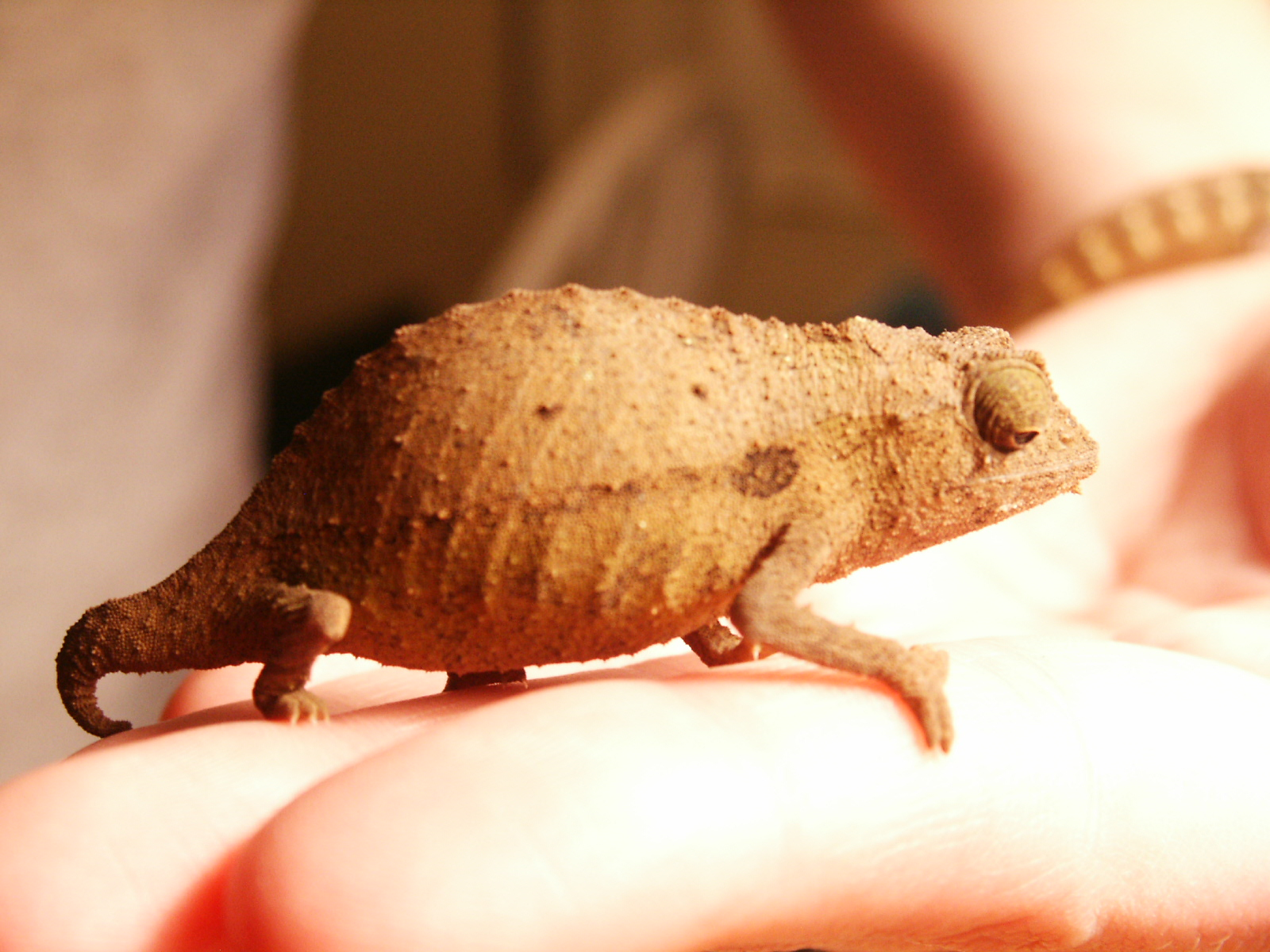
R. brevicaudatus female
