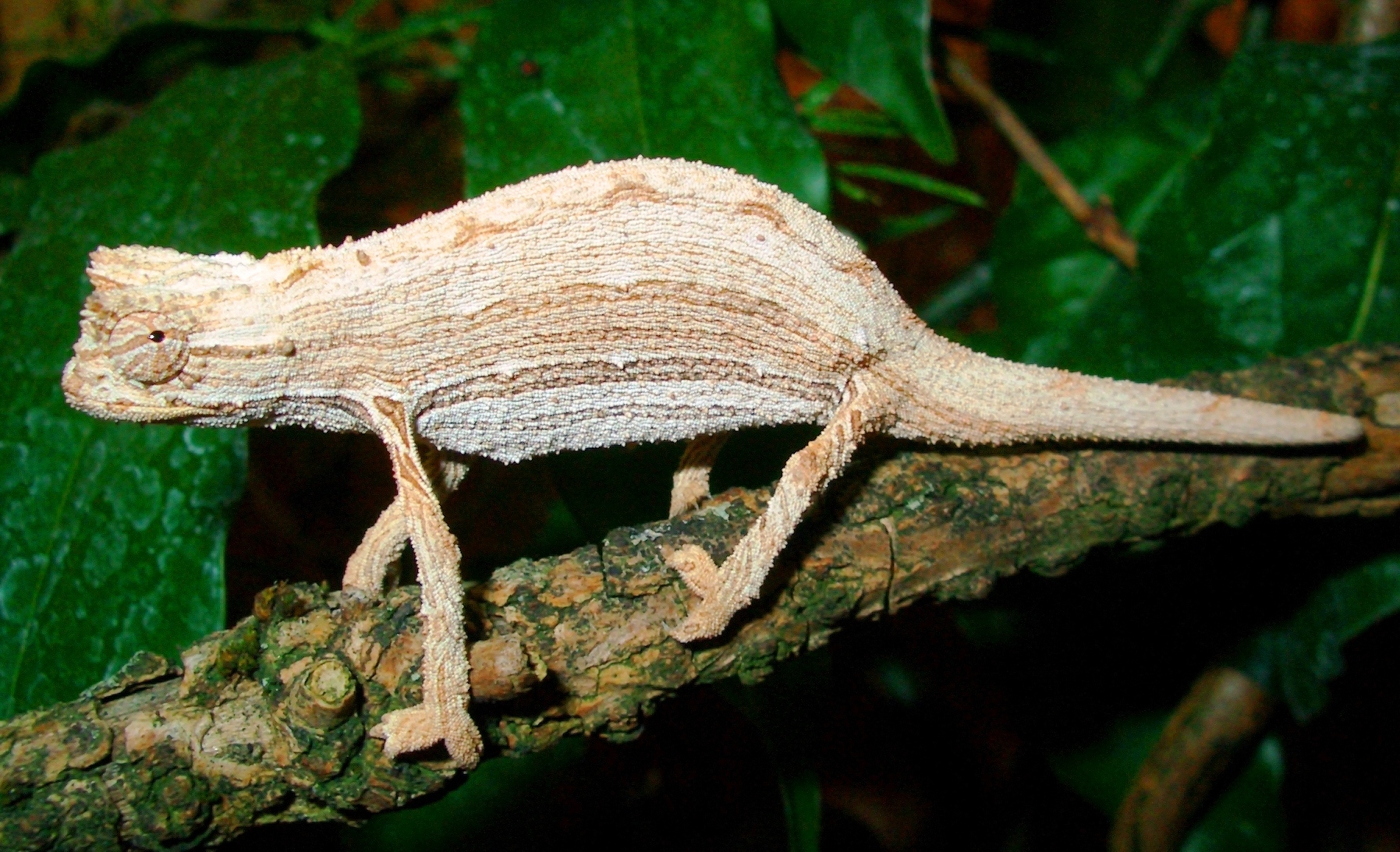

Conservation status
- Least Concern (IUCN 3.1)
- CITES Appendix II

Scientific classification
- Kingdom: Animalia
- Phylum: Chordata
- Class: Reptilia
- Order: Squamata
- Suborder: Iguania
- Family: Chamaeleonidae
- Genus: Rieppeleon
- Species: R. kerstenii

Binomial name
- Rieppeleon kerstenii (W. Peters, 1868)

Synonyms
- Chamaeleo kerstenii W. Peters, 1868; Rhampholeon kerstenii Fischer, 1884; Brookesia kerstenii Loveridge, 1936; Rieppeleon kerstenii Matthee et al., 2004

= Rieppeleon kerstenii =

Species of lizard

Rieppeleon kerstenii is species of chameleon, a lizard in the family Chamaeleonidae. The species is endemic to East Africa. There are two subspecies.

== Geographic range ==
R. kerstenii is found in eastern Ethiopia, Kenya, Somalia, and northeastern Tanzania.

== Habitat ==
R. kerstenii is found at altitudes from sea level to 1,500 m (4,900 ft), in a variety of habitats: shrubland, savanna, and forest.

== Common names ==
Common names for R. kerstenii include Kenya leaf chameleon, Kenya pygmy chameleon, Kenya stumptail chameleon, Kersten's pygmy chameleon, and pygmy grass chameleon.

== Etymologies ==
The specific name, kerstenii, is in honour of Otto Kersten (1839–1900), who was a German chemist and traveler.

The subspecific name, robecchii, is in honour of Luigi Robecchi Bricchetti (1855–1926), who was an Italian geologist and explorer.

== Behaviour ==
R. kerstenii is crepuscular.

== Diet ==
R. kerstenii preys upon insects and other arthropods.

== Reproduction ==
R. kerstenii is oviparous. Clutch size is as large as ten eggs.

== Subspecies ==
The following two subspecies are recognized as being valid, including the nominotypical subspecies.

- Rieppeleon kerstenii kerstenii (W. Peters, 1868)
- Rieppeleon kerstenii robecchii (Boulenger, 1891)
