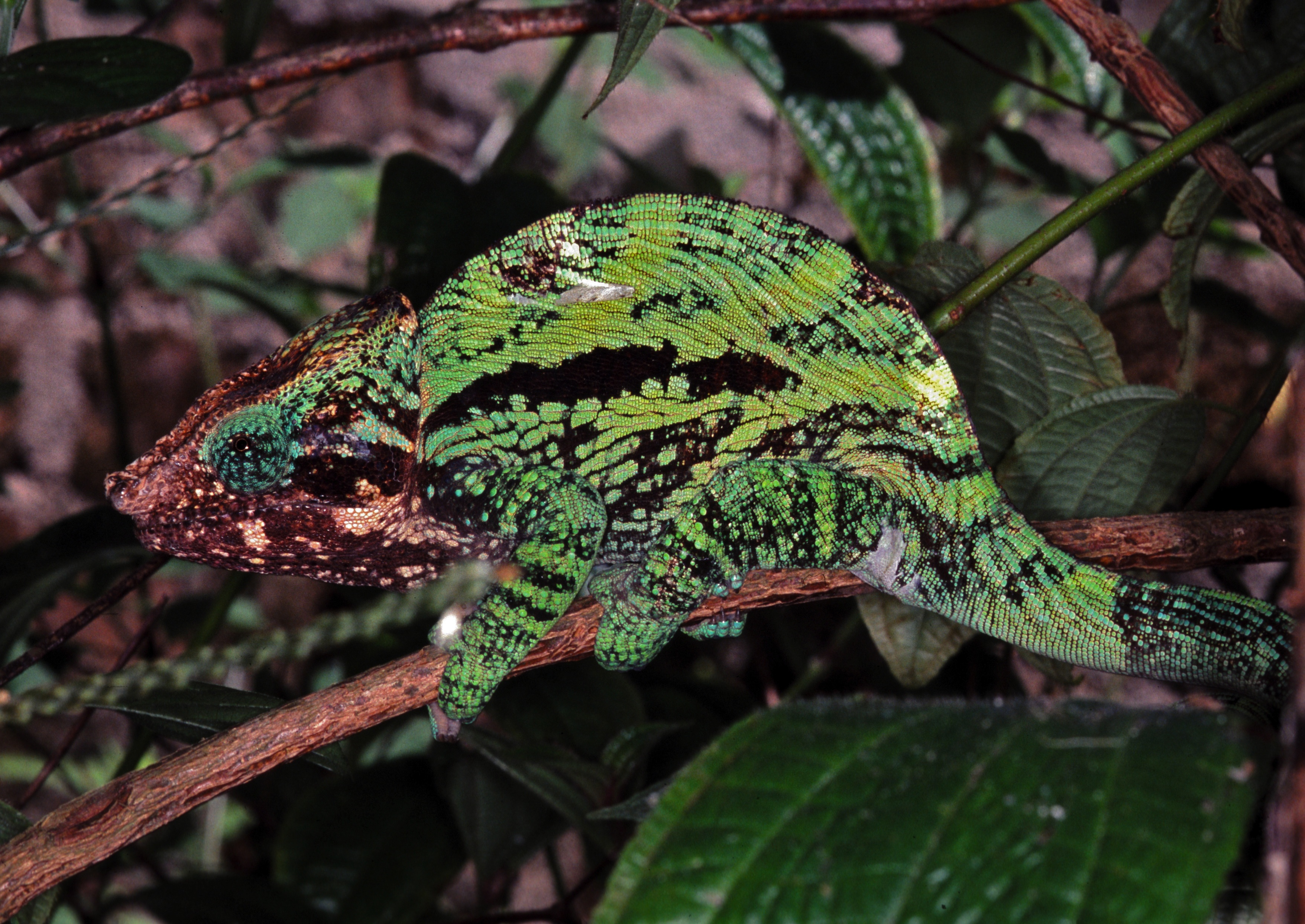

Conservation status
- Endangered (IUCN 3.1)

Scientific classification
- Kingdom: Animalia
- Phylum: Chordata
- Class: Reptilia
- Order: Squamata
- Suborder: Iguania
- Family: Chamaeleonidae
- Genus: Calumma
- Species: C. globifer

Binomial name
- Calumma globifer (Günther, 1879)
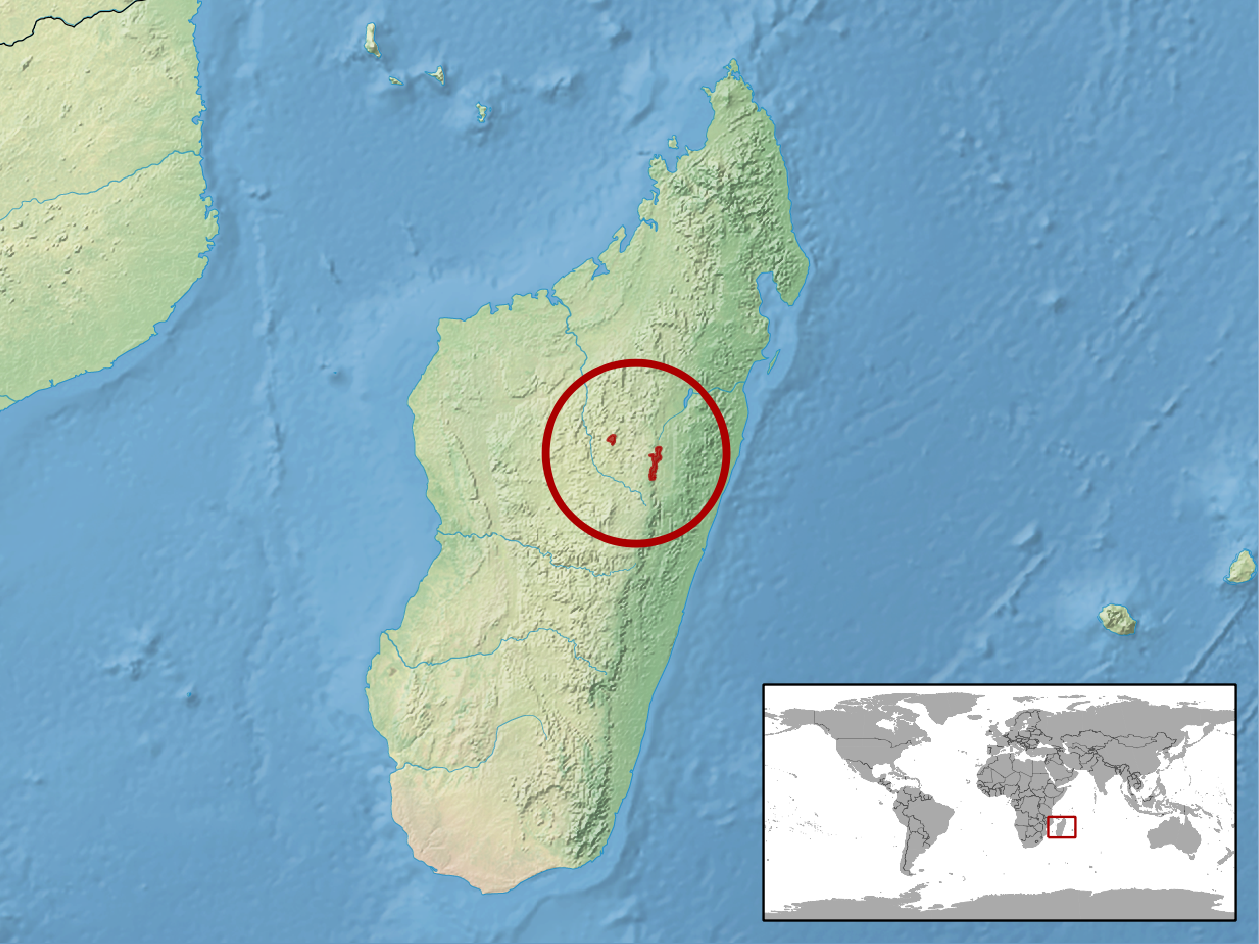

= Globe-horned chameleon =

Species of lizard

The globe-horned chameleon or flat-casqued chameleon (Calumma globifer) is a large species of chameleon endemic to isolated pockets of humid primary forest in eastern and south eastern Madagascar. It is listed on CITES Appendix II, meaning trade in this species is regulated.

== Description ==
Colour variations include red-brown, yellow, black, white, and green.
