= Calumma peyrierasi =

Conservation status
- Vulnerable (IUCN 3.1)

Scientific classification
- Kingdom: Animalia
- Phylum: Chordata
- Class: Reptilia
- Order: Squamata
- Suborder: Iguania
- Family: Chamaeleonidae
- Genus: Calumma
- Species: C. peyrierasi

Binomial name
- Calumma peyrierasi (Brygoo, Blanc & Domergue, 1974)
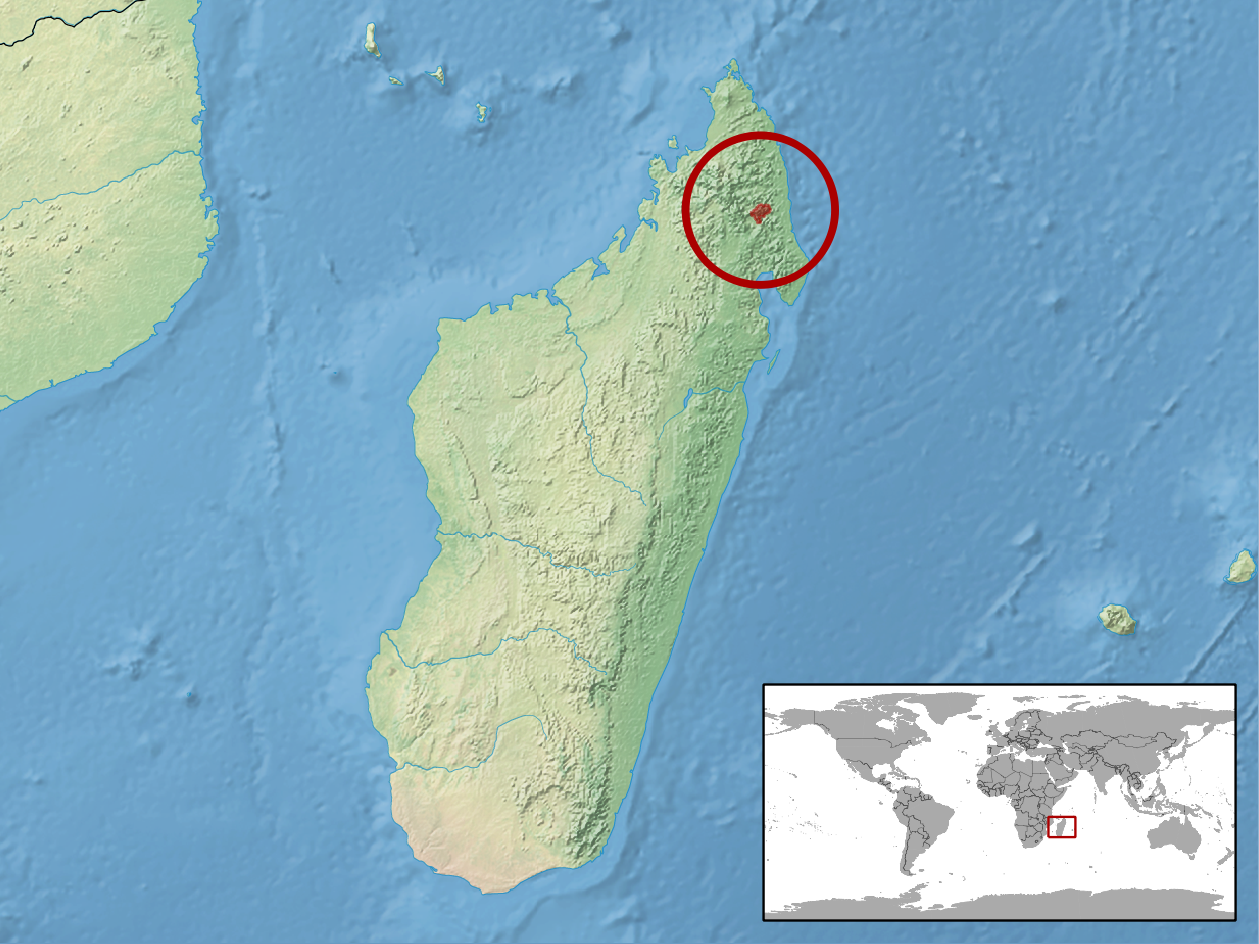

Synonyms
- Chamaeleo peyrierasi Brygoo, Blanc & Domergue, 1974

Species of lizard

Calumma peyrierasi is a species of chameleon, a lizard in the family Chamaeleonidae. The species is endemic to Madagascar.

== Etymology ==
The specific name, peyrierasi, is in honor of French herpetologist André Peyriéras.

== Geographic distribution ==
Calumma peyrierasi is found in northeastern Madagascar.

== Habitat ==
The preferred natural habitat of Calumma peyrierasi is shrubland, at elevations of 1,900–2,000 m (6,200–6,600 ft).

== Reproduction ==
Calumma peyrierasi is oviparous.
