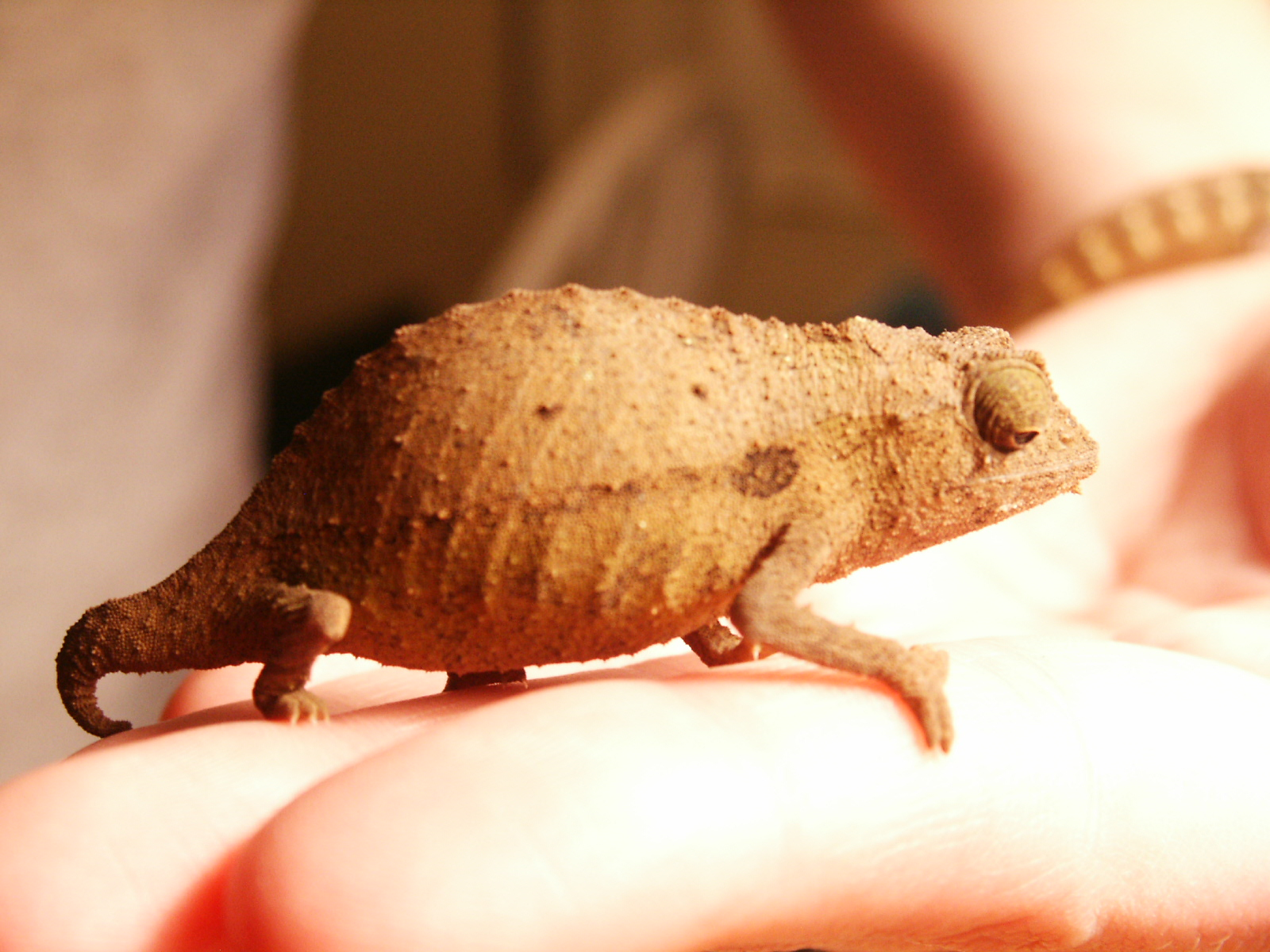
- Male R. brevicaudatus

Scientific classification
- Kingdom: Animalia
- Phylum: Chordata
- Class: Reptilia
- Order: Squamata
- Suborder: Iguania
- Family: Chamaeleonidae
- Subfamily: Chamaeleoninae
- Genus: Rieppeleon; Matthee, Tilbury & Townsend, 2004

= Rieppeleon =

Genus of lizards

Rieppeleon is a genus of small, typically brown chameleons found in forests and savannas in East Africa. Member species are found at low levels in bushes, or on the ground among grass or leaf litter.

== Etymology ==
The genus Rieppeleon was named after Swiss-born American herpetologist Olivier Rieppel (born 1951).

== Taxonomy ==
Until recently, the species in the genus Rieppeleon were commonly included in the genus Rhampholeon instead.

== Species ==
The following species are recognized as being valid.

Image	Scientific name	Common name	Distribution
	Rieppeleon brachyurus (Günther, 1893)	beardless pygmy chameleon	Malawi, Mozambique, and southeastern Tanzania.
	Rieppeleon brevicaudatus (Matschie, 1892)	bearded pygmy chameleon	eastern Usambara and Uluguru Mountains in northeastern Tanzania and Kenya
	Rieppeleon kerstenii (W. Peters, 1868)	Kenya pygmy chameleon	eastern Ethiopia, Kenya, Somalia, and northeastern Tanzania

Nota bene: A binomial authority, or trinomial authority, in parentheses indicates that the species, or subspecies, was originally described in a genus other than Rieppeleon.
