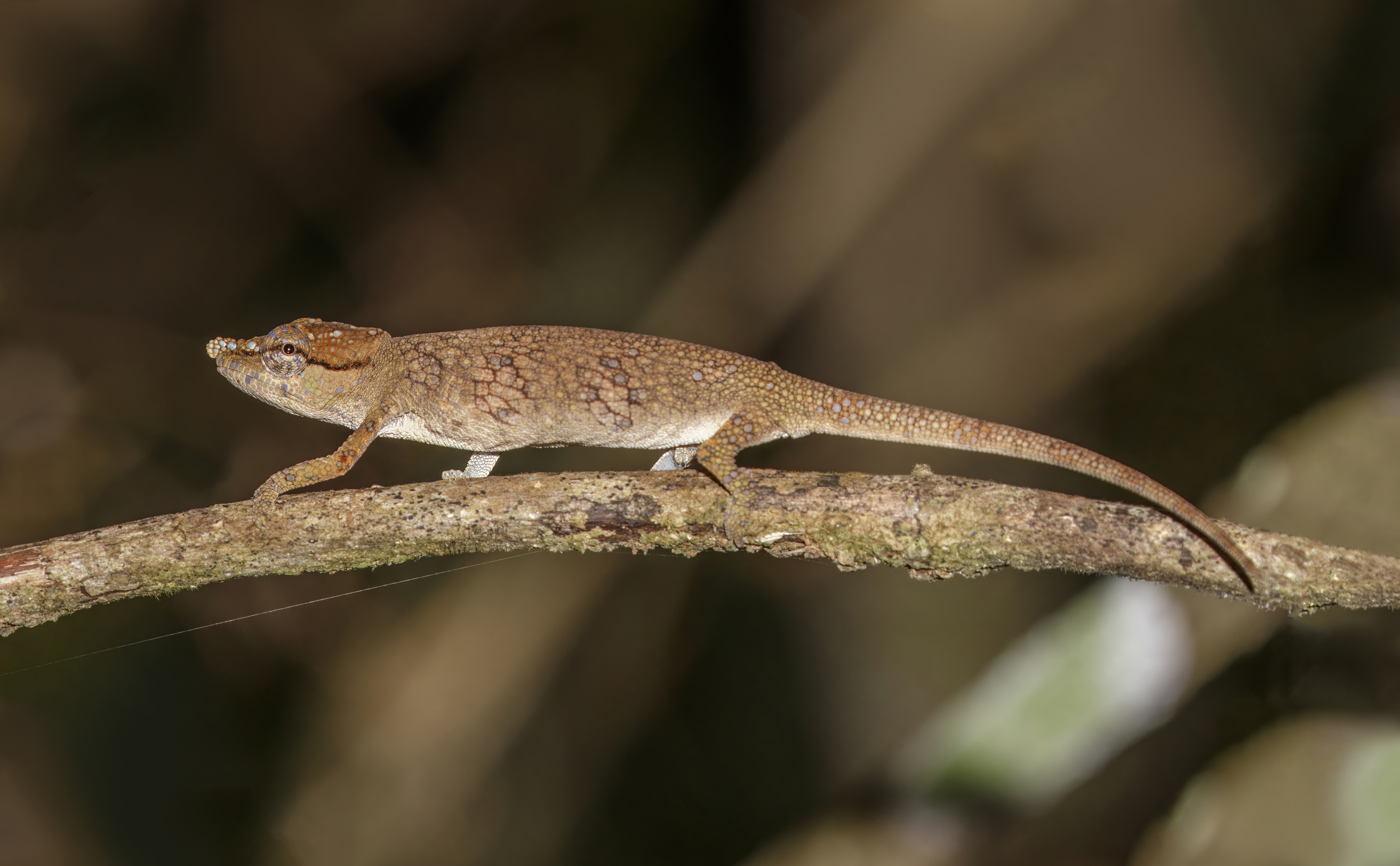

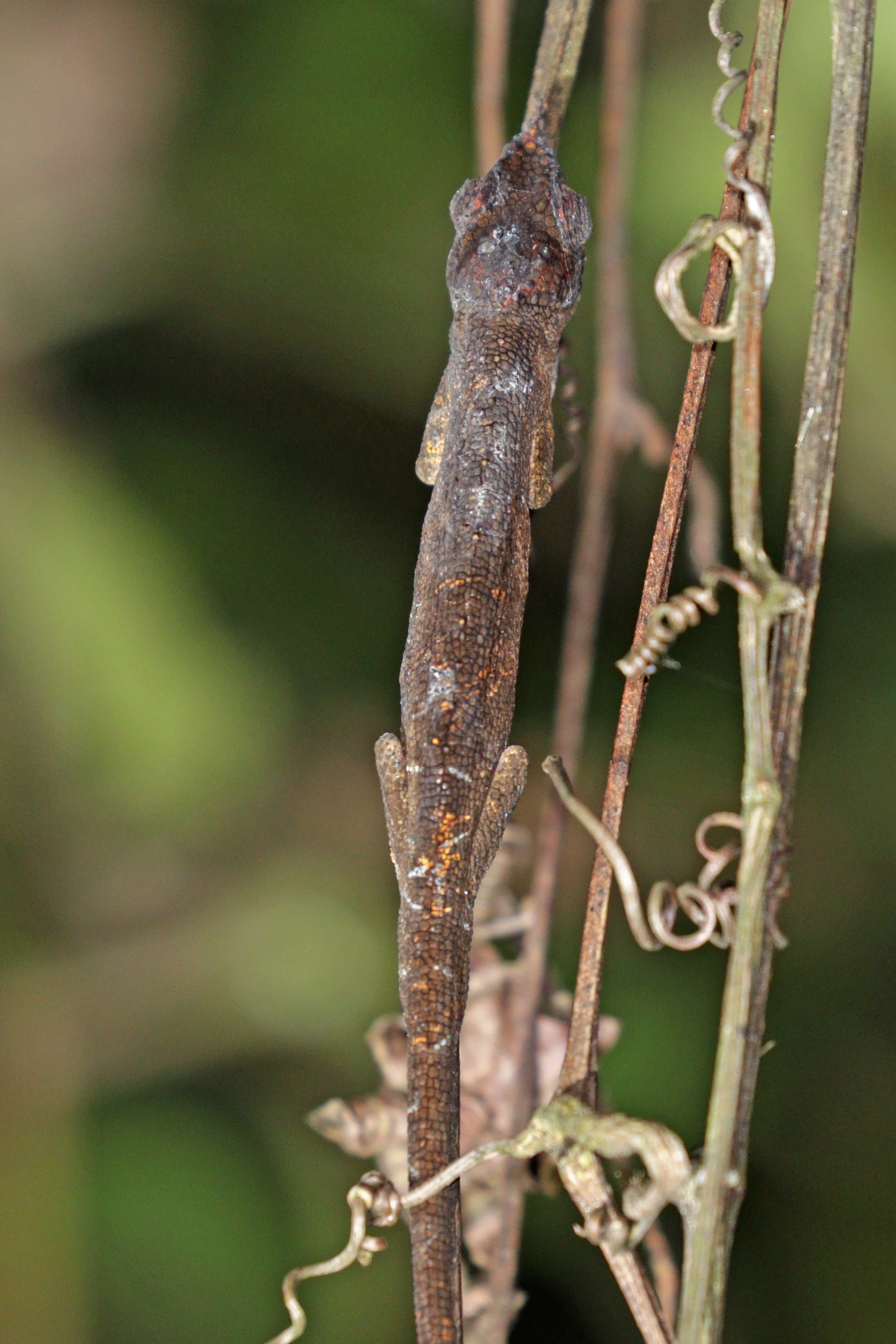
- Both in Ranomafana National Park

Conservation status
- Data Deficient (IUCN 3.1)

Scientific classification
- Kingdom: Animalia
- Phylum: Chordata
- Class: Reptilia
- Order: Squamata
- Suborder: Iguania
- Family: Chamaeleonidae
- Genus: Calumma
- Species: C. fallax

Binomial name
- Calumma fallax (Mocquard, 1900)
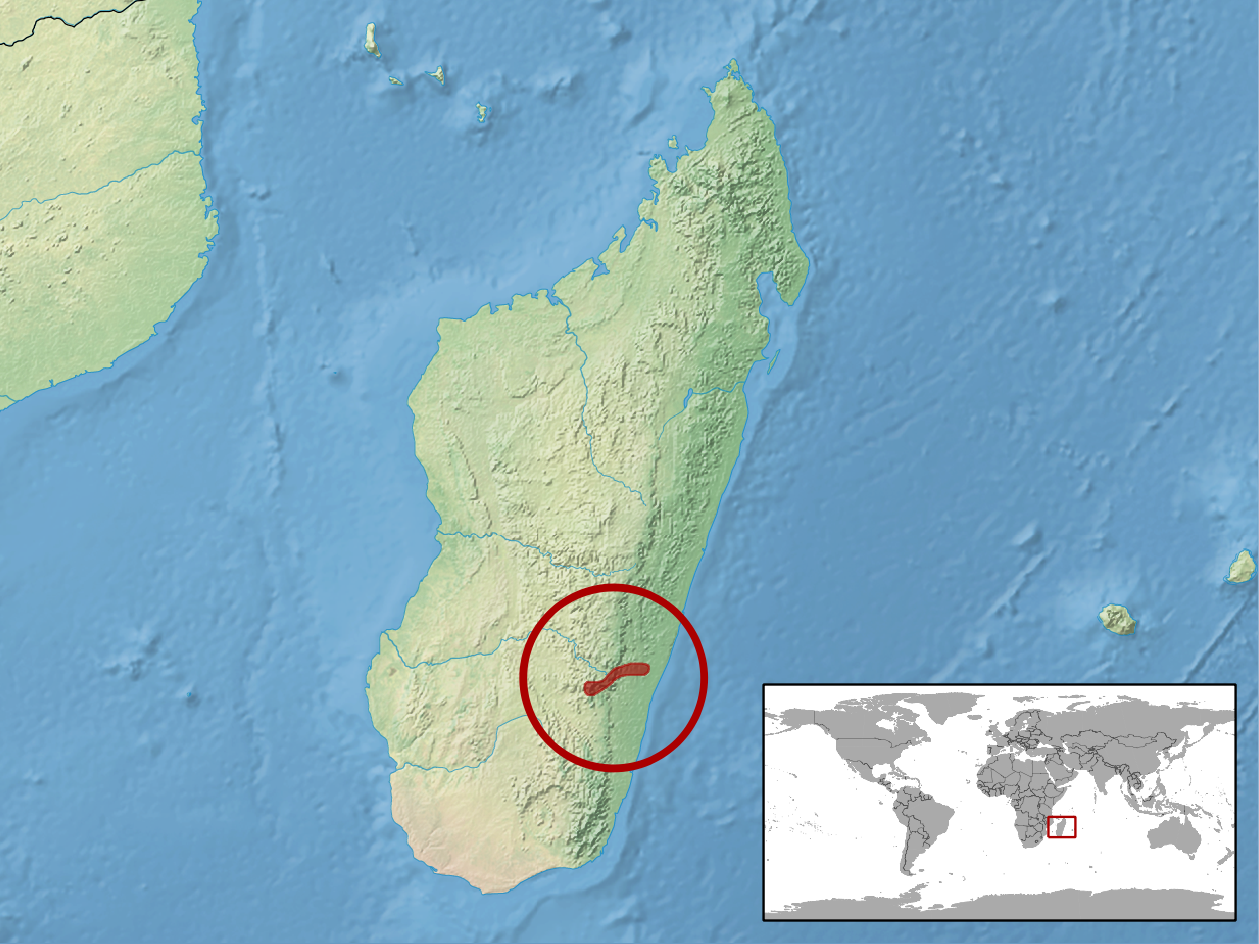

Synonyms
- Chamaeleon fallax Mocquard, 1900

= Calumma fallax =

Species of lizard

Calumma fallax, the deceptive chameleon or short-nosed deceptive chameleon is a species of chameleon endemic to eastern Madagascar, where its type locality is the Ikongo forest. It was first described by François Mocquard in 1900 as Chamaeleon fallax, and it was first recognized as Calumma fallax in 1986. It is a member of the Chamaeleoninae nominotypical subfamily of chameleons, and is believed to be found over an area of 2,057 km^{2} (794 sq mi), although the population is unknown.

== Distribution and habitat ==
Calumma fallax is endemic to eastern Madagascar, and has a type locality of the Ikongo forest, Madagascar. It can be found at a mid-altitude over an area of about 2,057 km^{2} (794 sq mi), although this is not confirmed. The International Union for Conservation of Nature has classed this species as "data deficient", as not enough information on this species is available to correctly classify it. The population of this species is unknown and no population trend is known. It is found in an area where the habitat is affected by the slash-and-burn agricultural method, bushfires, and logging. Calumma fallax is used in the pet industry and is sometimes domesticated.

== Taxonomy ==
It was first described in 1900 by Mocquard as Chamaeleon fallax, and accepted as valid by Werner 11 years later under the same name. In 1986, Klaver and Böhme moved it to the genus Calumma. This combination has been accepted in later studies.

== Description ==
Calumma fallax is a medium-sized chameleon, with males measuring 43–51 mm (1.7–2.0 in) and females 41–51 mm (1.6–2.0 in) in snout–vent length; it can reach a total length of 107 mm (4.2 in).
