= Francisco Antônio de Almeida Júnior =

Brazilian astronomer, engineer, and educator

- Francisco Antônio de Almeida Júnior
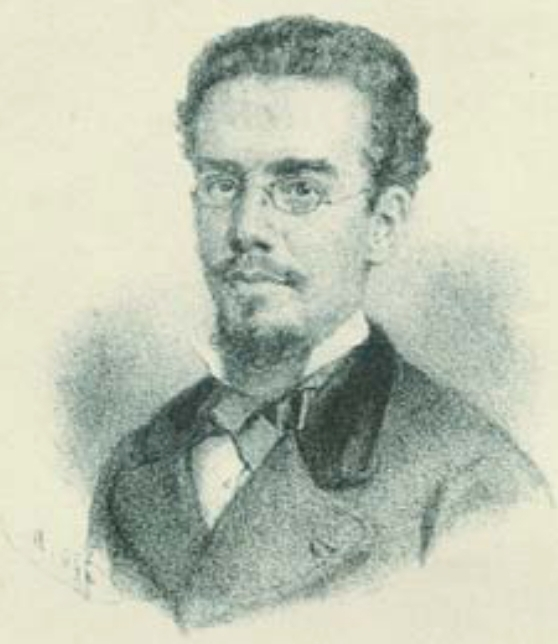
- Born: 4 May 1851
- Died: 12 September 1928 (aged 77)
- Education: National Observatory, Polytechnic School of the Federal University of Rio de Janeiro, University of Bonn
- Occupations: Astronomer, engineer, university teacher, writer, chief of police (1890–), military personnel
- Employers: Guarda Nacional; Diário Oficial da União (1891–1891); Polytechnic School of the Federal University of Rio de Janeiro (1878–)
- Notable work: De motibus aeris, From France to Japan, Map of the Empire of Japan, The Federation and the Monarchy, The Solar Parallax and the Transits of Venus
- Spouse: Mathilde Martins de Almeida
- Children: Francisco Antônio de Almeida Júnior, Abel de Almeida
- Parents: Francisco Antônio de Almeida (father); Joaquina Francisca de Miranda (mother)
- Awards: Knight of the Imperial Order of the Rose (1875)

Signature
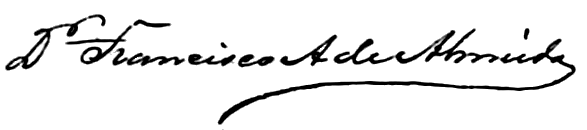

Francisco Antônio de Almeida Júnior (4 May 1851 – 12 September 1928) was a Brazilian astronomer, engineer and university professor during the latter half of the 19th century. Almeida was part of a commission tasked with calculating the stellar parallax of the Sun during the 1874 transit of Venus. Almeida was an important figure in the development of cinematography, and he was the first known Brazilian to visit Japan and publish a book about his sojourn in China and Japan.

== Life ==
=== Early life ===
Almeida was born in the Empire of Brazil on 4 May 1851 in a prominent family of Niterói, the firstborn son of the colonel, politician and money lender Francisco Antônio de Almeida (1820–1889) from his marriage to Joaquina Francisca de Miranda. While young, Almeida was sent to Europe to study engineering in Paris. In 1870, he married Mathilde Martins (1854–1933), at around the same time when Almeida took up the role of "block inspector" in the city of Rio de Janeiro. (Note: A type of police officer in 19th-century Brazil.) In that same year, he requested enrollment as a first year student at the Central School, where he was already attending classes.

=== 1874 expedition ===
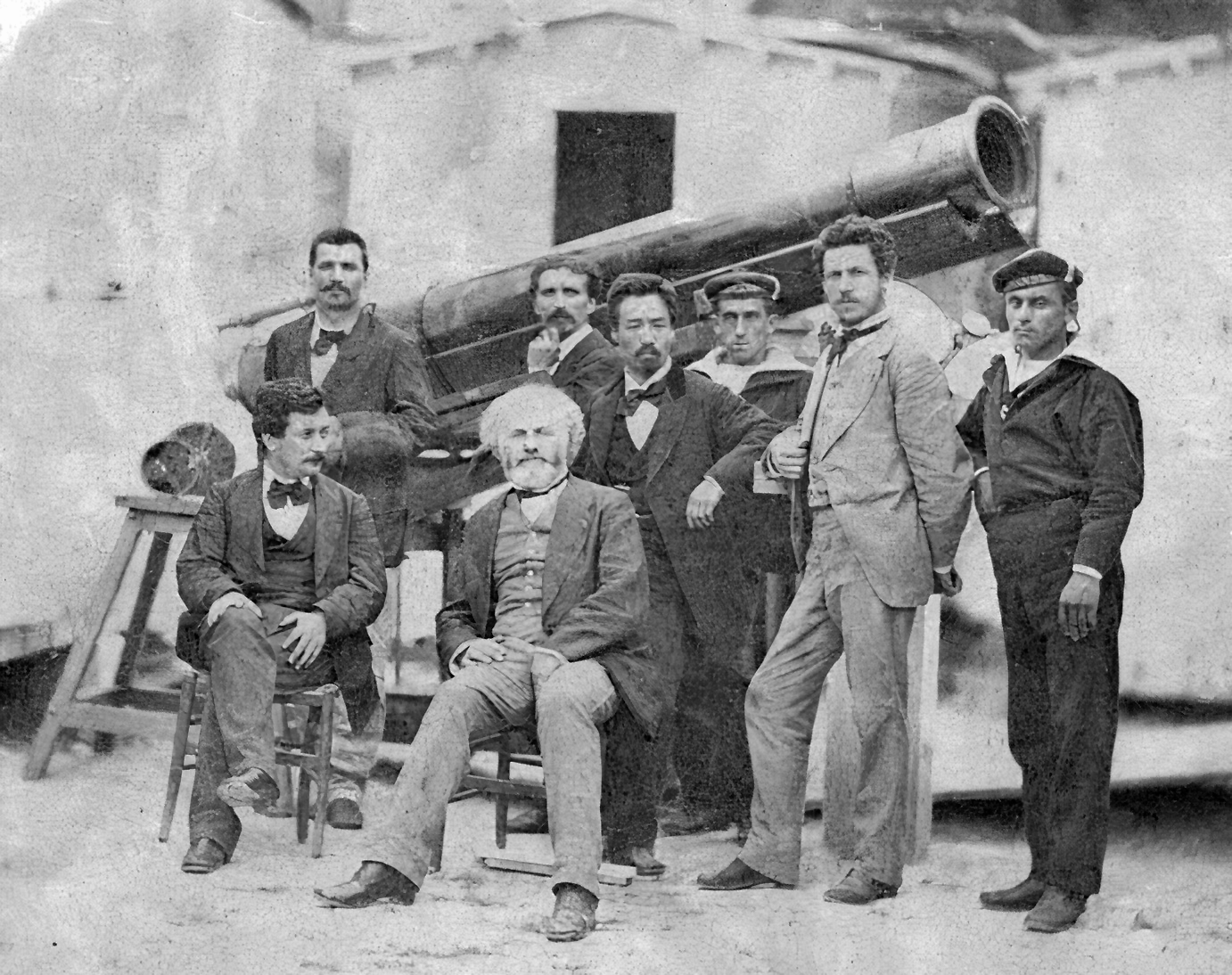
The crew in Paris, 1874. Almeida is the second from right to left, and Janssen is at the center, seated. In the background, the photographic revolver.

Passage de Vénus, the sequence of images of the transit of Venus recorded by the expedition

In 1871, Emperor Pedro II offered to the French scientist Emmanuel Liais the directorship of the Imperial Observatory of Rio de Janeiro, who accepted the invitation on the condition that he be allowed to modernize the institution and train its employees. To that end, on the following year, Interim Director Viscount of Prados requested from the Ministry of War that two of the Observatory's students, Julião de Oliveira Lacaille and Francisco Antônio de Almeida, were sent to France to study astronomy. The request was accepted in June 1872, with the study term set to last for three years.

For the 1874 transit of Venus, Liais advised the French government to include Almeida as an attaché in one of the various scientific expeditions planned by the French to observe the astronomical event, with backing from the Brazilian government. Almeida took part in the commission bound for Japan, led by astronomer Jules Janssen.

He departed on 19 August from the port of Marseille, in France, on board the packet boat Ava, a vessel at service of the French Compagnie des Messageries Maritimes that regularly made the route from France to Japan. In his itinerary, Almeida visited places such as Naples, Port Said, Aden, Sri Lanka, Malacca, Singapore, Cochinchina (now known as Vietnam), Hong Kong, Yokohama, Nagasaki and Tokyo. In his 48-day trip eastward, Almeida stopped by various ports and faced, unharmed, a typhoon in Hong Kong that killed around eight thousand people, according to English newspapers of the time cited in his account. He arrived in Yokohama on 3 October and stayed in Japan for the following three months.

On 8 December, Janssen sent some of the members of his party to Kobe as insurance, in case bad weather made it difficult to observe the transit, but kept Almeida and other collaborators with him in the city of Nagasaki. Atop Mount Konpira, Almeida operated Janssen's photographic revolver, an instrument through which 47 images of the transit of Venus in front of the solar disk were recorded. The resulting work, Passage de Vénus, is seen as one of the first chronophotographic sequences in history.

On the way back from Japan, Almeida and the rest of the crew spent a few days in Shanghai and then, aboard the Messageries Maritimes packet boat La Provence, made the trip home, with stop overs in Saigon, Singapore, Sri Lanka, Aden, Suez, Naples and eventually Paris, after a nine-month sojourn in Asia. On their stop in Egypt, they visited Alexandria.

Based on what he saw and learned during the expedition, Almeida published The Parallax of the Sun and the Transits of Venus (1878) and From France to Japan: Travel narration and historical description, uses and customs of the inhabitants of China, Japan and other Asian countries (1879). While the former is a scientific work on astronomy, the latter describes not only the experiments done in 1874, but also offers an ethnographic and sociopolitical account of regions such as the Persian Gulf, India, Indochina, the Philippines and localities along the coasts of China and Japan.

Itinerary of the places visited by the French scientific commission, according to Almeida's account and other ancillary sources. Interactive map, click to zoom.

=== Return to Brazil ===
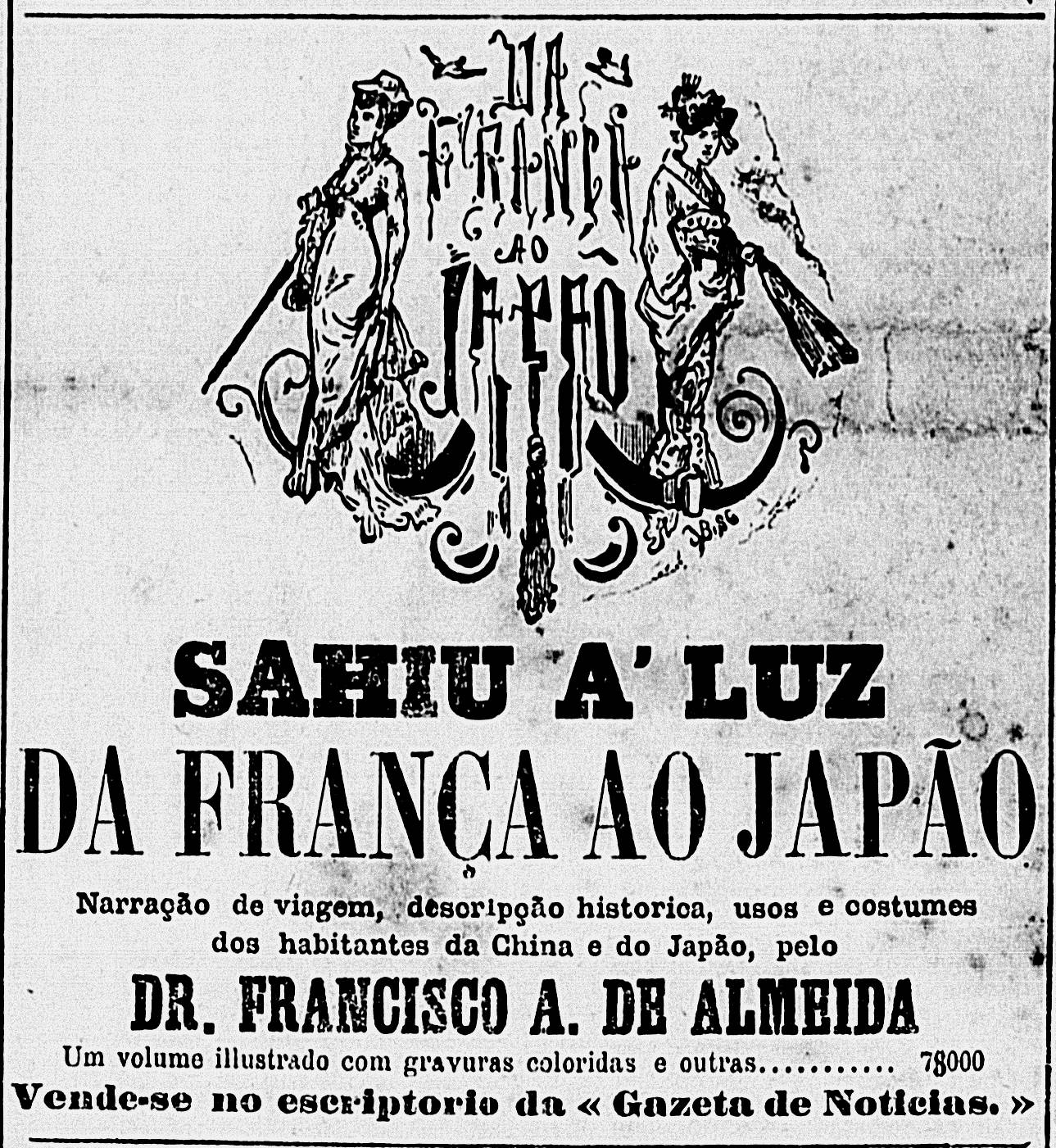
Newspaper advert for the launch of Almeida's From France to Japan (1879)

After his voyage, Almeida remained in Europe for two years. In 1875, he was accepted as a member of the Société de Géographie of Paris, where Janssen served as vice-president, and the following year, he graduated as doctor in Physics and Mathematics, defending his thesis entitled De motibus aeris at the University of Bonn, partly based on data on the 1874 Hong Kong typhoon he experienced. Almeida returned to Brazil in February 1876. Between 1878 and 1881, Almeida served as an interim professor at the Polytechnic School of Rio de Janeiro, after presenting to the then director Viscount of Rio Branco a dissertation on the iron ore mines at Jacupiranguinha River and the basis for an exploitation project. In 1880, he returned to Europe, where he edited a technical publication on engineering, and went to Brazil once more, three years later.

A republican and an abolitionist, Almeida believed that the establishment of the republican form of government in Brazil would take place through the universalization of education and a political awareness from the whole of society. On that topic, he wrote the book The Federation and the Monarchy, in 1889.

With the onset of the First Brazilian Republic, he was nominated for various civil servant positions: director of the 2nd Section of the Statistics Bureau of the State of Rio de Janeiro in March 1890; engineer at the Companhia Cantareira e Viação Fluminense in April 1890; member of the Governance Board of Niterói on the recommendation of Governor Francisco Portela from April to July 1890; director of Brazil's official gazette, the Diário Oficial, between July and November 1891 and chief of police of Niterói.

A critic of President Floriano Peixoto, Almeida was identified as a participant in the Manifesto of the Thirteen Generals of 10 April 1892, and was thus detained for 100 days at the Villegagnon Fortress and, subsequently, at the São João Fortress. (Note: Soares (2017) erroneously asserts that Almeida was initially arrested at the Santa Cruz da Barra Fortress and later deported to the Amazon with José do Patrocínio.) In April of the same year, Rui Barbosa filed for a habeas corpus in the Supreme Federal Court to plead for the release of Senator Admiral Eduardo Wandenkolk and other citizens (among them, Almeida), but had his petition denied. Almeida left prison on his own accord a few months later, on 19 July, while the following month, a general amnesty was granted to all political prisoners.

After his arrest, he traveled to France, but returned soon after due to diseases in his family and disputes among his siblings for his father's inheritance. In 1894, during the Naval Revolt, Almeida volunteered as a civilian to combat, in the name of the Republic, the rebellious sailors led by Admiral Saldanha da Gama. He made a similar offer in 1897, when he presented himself as an "engineer or soldier," to fight against Antônio Conselheiro at the War of Canudos.

By the end of 1894, Floriano Peixoto nominated him consul at the Brazilian Consulate in Montreal, and appointed him as an aide for a consular mission to China, as one of Peixoto's last measures as president. However, since he didn't sign the presidential decrees, Almeida's nomination to the consulate had no effect and was canceled in December. The mission to China, planned since 1892, suffered from delays due to a bubonic plague epidemic in Hong Kong and the outbreak of the First Sino-Japanese War, and was finally terminated. Almeida never left Rio de Janeiro in the interim, but was compensated for his preparatory work.

He also served in the National Guard as lieutenant-colonel commander of the First Battalion of Position Artillery between 1890 and 1892 and captain in 1904. He was also cited as an honorary colonel in the Army in 1894.

=== Personal life ===
From his marriage to Mathilde Martins, he had two sons: Abel de Almeida (1883–1958), a journalist and high-ranking public servant at the Ministry of Agriculture, and Francisco Antônio de Almeida Júnior (1880–1958), a blind teacher at Instituto Benjamin Constant.

== Legacy ==
Frontispiece of the December 1880 issue of the Revista Illustrada, satirizing the observation of the transit of Venus

In his time, Almeida was object of public satire in the anti-monarchist magazine Revista Illustrada, who referred to the observation of the transit of Venus as an 'old thing' in the field of Astronomy and criticized the 1874 expedition as a waste of public money on behalf of the Imperial government, estimated by the newspaper to have cost 100:000$000 (one hundred contos-de-réis, or one hundred million réis), of which 66% were provided by the government, and the remainder by the people through subscriptions. Congressman Ferreira Viana mocked Almeida's role as being that of a mere "[shipper] of instruments for the wise men of France."

Despite the criticism, Francisco Antônio de Almeida acquired some prestige following the publication of From France to Japan, an easy-to-read book filled with exoticisms of countries that were completely unknown to most Brazilian readers. For his contributions, Almeida was awarded in 1875 the title of knight of the Imperial Order of the Rose, and a commemorative medal granted by the French government. Almeida's voyage has, according to researcher Argeu Guimarães, sparked the curiosity of Brazilian authorities and contributed to the dispatch of the first diplomatic mission to Japan and China in 1879–1880.

According to Emmanuel de Macedo Soares, Almeida assisted Rio de Janeiro Governor Francisco Portela in the founding of two charitable associations, namely Isabel Portela, dismantled with the deposition of the governor, and Charitas.

Through the use of Janssen's photographic revolver, Almeida had an important role in the development of film production. Almeida is also credited as the first Brazilian to visit Japan and publish a work about both Japan and China. From France to Japan was the first Western work about Japan since the end of that country's isolationist period, although Pierre Loti's 1887 work Madame Chrysanthème is most often recognized as pioneering and influential in this regard, due to the then predominance of the French language. In 2020, the Embassy of Brazil in Tokyo celebrated Almeida's contributions to science and highlighted the novelty of his visit to Japan.

== Works ==
List of works by Francisco Antônio de Almeida:

- Passage de Vénus (1874)
- De motibus aeris (1876)
- News about the iron mines at Jacupiranguinha and the basis for a mining project (1878)
- The Parallax of the Sun and the Transits of Venus (1878)
- From France to Japan: Travel narration and historical description, uses and customs of the inhabitants of China, Japan and other Asian countries (1879)
  - Map of the Empire of Japan (included in From France to Japan)
- The Federation and the Monarchy (1889) (Note: Sacramento Blake records the work as "The Federation and the Republic," and that has been frequently repeated by several researchers, although the correct title is "The Federation and the Monarchy," as stated on the November 1889 issue of the publication A Epocha, and on the online catalog of the National Library of Brazil.)

== Bibliography ==
- Francisco Antônio de Almeida Júnior, OL 2324610A, Wikidata Q99836778
