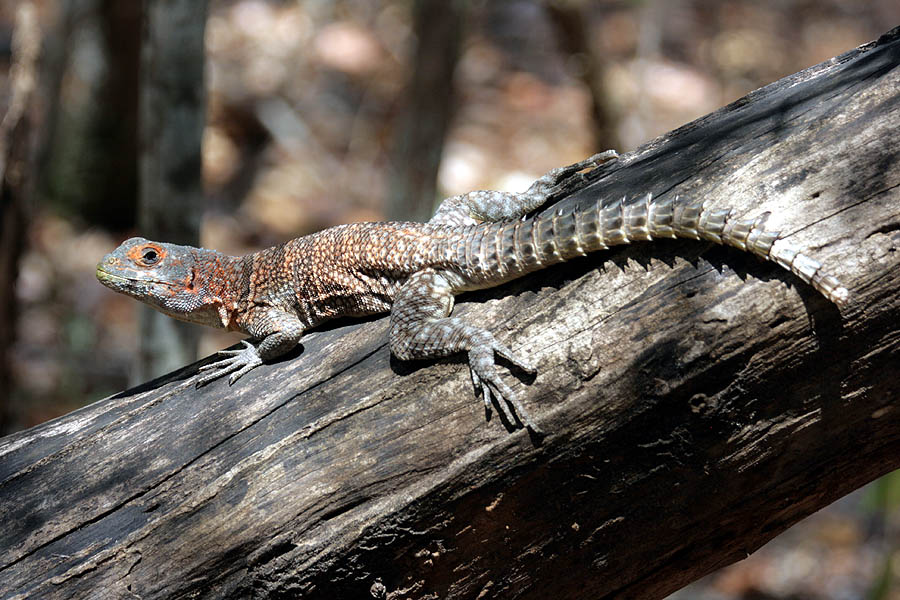

Scientific classification
- Kingdom: Animalia
- Phylum: Chordata
- Class: Reptilia
- Order: Squamata
- Suborder: Iguania
- Family: Opluridae
- Genus: Oplurus; Cuvier, 1829

= Oplurus =

Genus of lizards

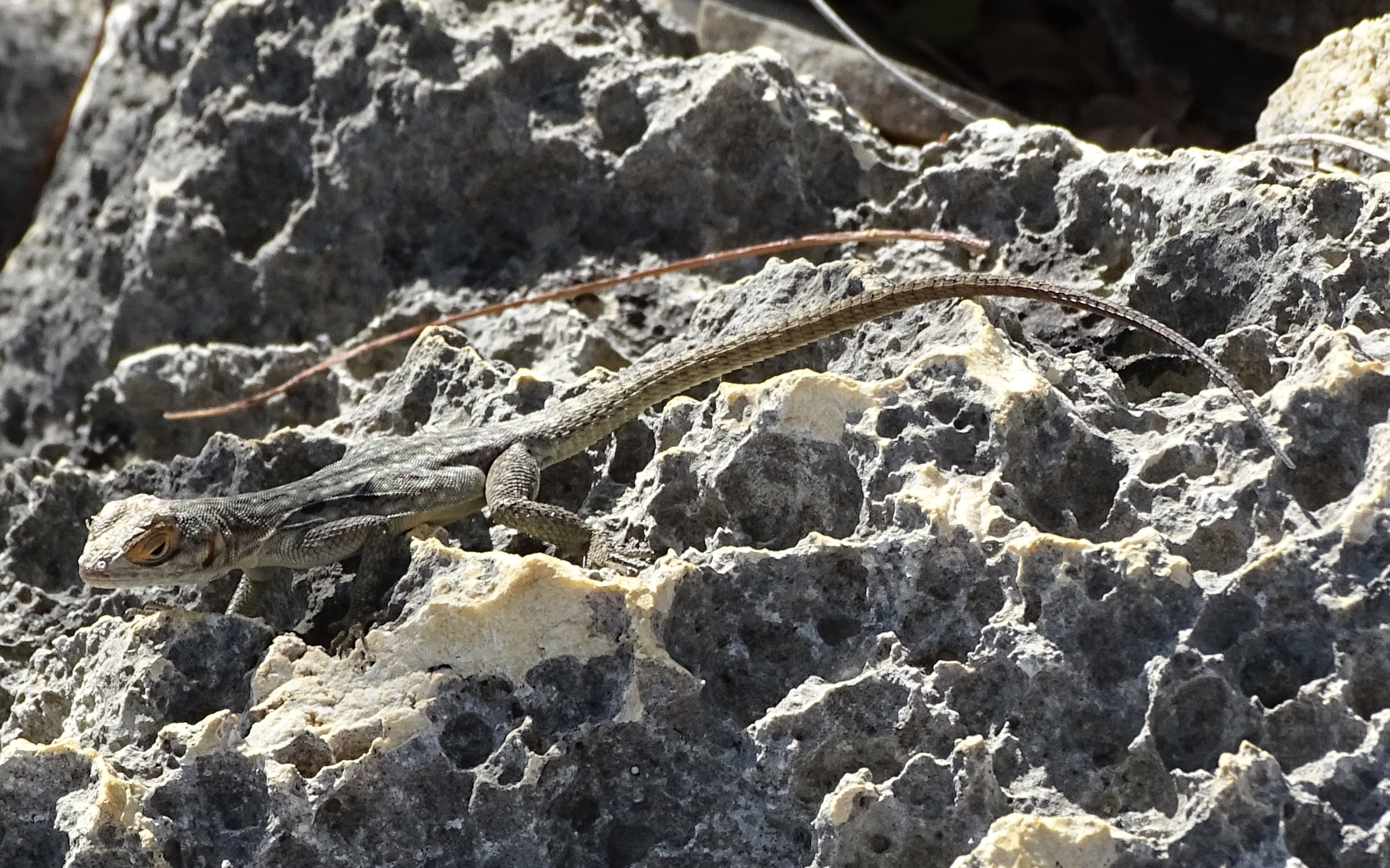
An Oplurus iguana (saxicolous) with tail twice as long as body. Light grey without banding

Oplurus is a genus of Malagasy iguanian lizards, most of which are rock-dwelling terrestrial species.

The sister genus to Oplurus is Chalarodon, which contains two species: Chalarodon madagascariensis and Chalarodon steinkampi, which are terrestrial iguanas and easily distinguished from Oplurus by its smaller size and the presence of a distinct dorsal crest.

== Species ==
The six recognized species in the genus Oplurus comprise two distinct clades.

- Spiny-tailed arboreal clade:
  - Merrem's Madagascar swift (Oplurus cyclurus)
  - Collared iguana (Oplurus cuvieri)
- Saxicolous (rock dwelling) clade:
  - Madagascar blue iguana (Oplurus fierinensis) (greyish-blue without dark dorsal bands)
  - Grandidier's Madagascar swift (Oplurus grandidieri (with light mid-dorsal band)
  - Duméril's Madagascar swift (Oplurus quadrimaculatus) (with four dorsal bands, dorsal scales coarsely granular)
  - Marked Madagascar swift (Oplurus saxicola) (different darker color pattern, dorsal scales finely granular)

Because of differences is appearance (i.e. the lack of a black neck band), possibly a larger body, and its geographic isolation, the form of Oplurus cuvieri species found on the Comoro archipelago has recently been given full species rank, as Oplurus comorensis (Meirte 2004). However the molecular phylogeny research concludes that this full species status is unwarranted.

== Distribution ==
All six species of Oplurus are all found in Madagascar, with five being endemic. Oplurus cuvieri is also found on Grande Comore . Subfossil remains of a large, extinct, species have also been found on Aldabra.

The two spiny-tailed species (Oplurus cuvieri, Oplurus cyclurus) and Oplurus fierinensis are found in the arid parts of the south and west of Madagascar, whilst the other three species are found on the ground and rocks in the central and southern highland regions and the south. Oplurus cuvieri is the most widely distributed, and the only species found in Tsingy de Bemaraha National Park.
