= Guillaume Grandidier =

French geographer, ethnologist, zoologist

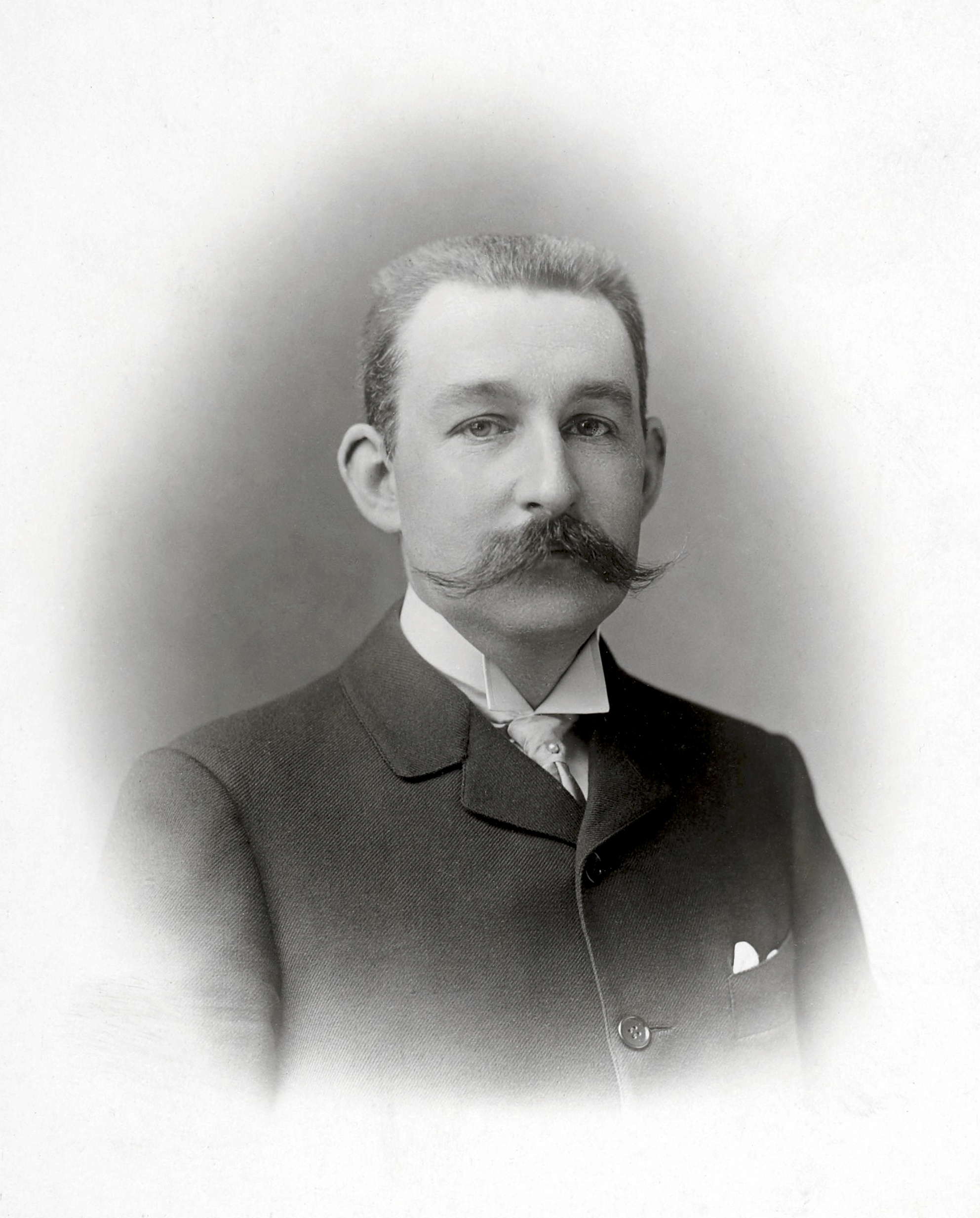
- Born: 1 July 1873; Paris, France
- Died: 13 September 1957 (aged 84); Paris, France
- Known for: Atlas des Colonies Françaises, Protectorats et Territoires sous Mandat de la France
- Father: Alfred Grandidier
- Relatives: Ernest Grandidier (uncle)
- Scientific career
- Fields: Geographer, ethnologist, zoologist
- Author abbrev. (zoology): G. Grandidier

Guillaume Grandidier (1 July 1873 – 13 September 1957) was a French geographer, ethnologist, and zoologist who studied the island of Madagascar.

He was the son of the wealthy industrialist Alfred Grandidier also a zoologist and expert on Madagascar. Guillaume Grandidier was Secretary of the Geographical Society of Paris and a prolific author.

The Atlas des Colonies Françaises, Protectorats et Territoires sous Mandat de la France, simply known as the Atlas Grandidier, was published under his direction in 1934. Among his other works was the monumental Madagascar L'Histoire politique, physique et naturelle de Madagascar. This work was undertaken in cooperation with his father and others such as Alphonse Milne-Edwards and Leon Vaillant. This work ran to 40 volumes.

Liopholidophis grandidieri, a species of snake endemic to Madagascar, was named in his honor by French herpetologist François Mocquard.
