= Passage de Vénus =

Photos of the transit of Venus in 1874

Animated version of a test plate for Passage de Vénus

Passage de Vénus is a series of photographs of the transit of the planet Venus across the Sun on 9 December 1874. They were purportedly taken in Japan by the French astronomer Jules Janssen and Brazilian engineer Francisco Antônio de Almeida using Janssen's 'photographic revolver'.

A 2005 study of the surviving material concluded that all the extant plates made with the photographic revolver are practice plates shot with a model, and if any of the many plates successfully exposed during the eclipse have survived, their whereabouts are unknown.

== Subject of the photos – 1874 transit of Venus ==
The 1874 transit of Venus, which took place on 9 December 1874 (01:49 to 06:26 UTC), was the first of the pair of transits of Venus that took place in the 19th century, with the second transit occurring eight years later in 1882. The previous pair of transits had taken place in 1761 and 1769, and the next pair would not take place until 2004 and 2012. As with previous transits, the 1874 transit would provide an opportunity for improved measurements and observations. Numerous expeditions were planned and sent out to observe the transit from locations around the globe, with several countries setting up official committees to organise the planning.

== Filming the transit ==
Due to the popularity of the event, numerous expeditions to over 80 locations were ventured, and many expeditions considered the best way by which to record the event.

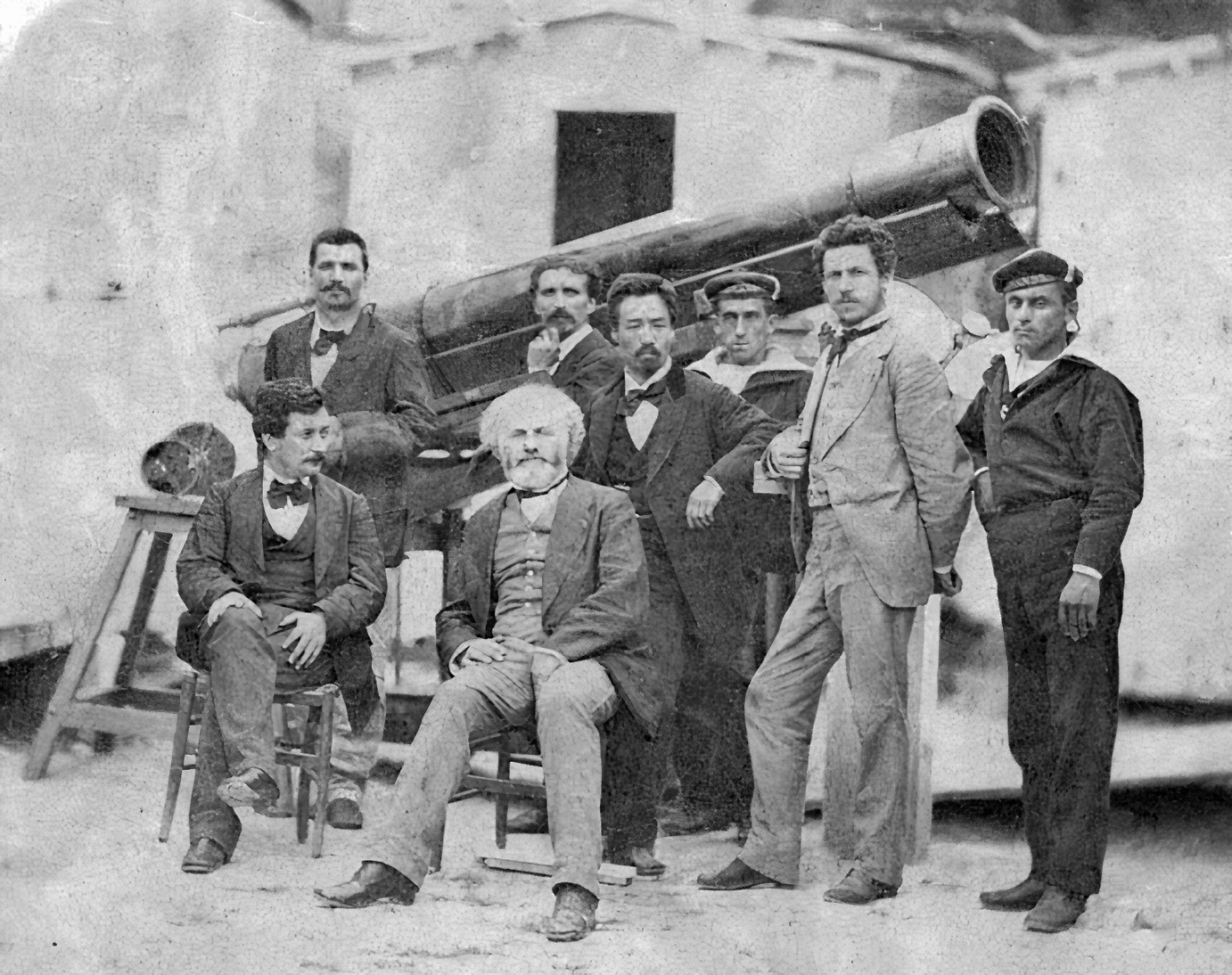
The team that captured the transit of Venus in 1874

Frenchman inventor Janssen came up with the idea for a "revolver photographic". This was a large camera based on the Maltese cross mechanism, which is an important milestone in the development of cameras used to film movies. The revolver could take several dozens of exposures at regulated intervals on a daguerreotype disc.

== See also ==
- The Horse in Motion, 1878 series of photographs
- History of film technology
