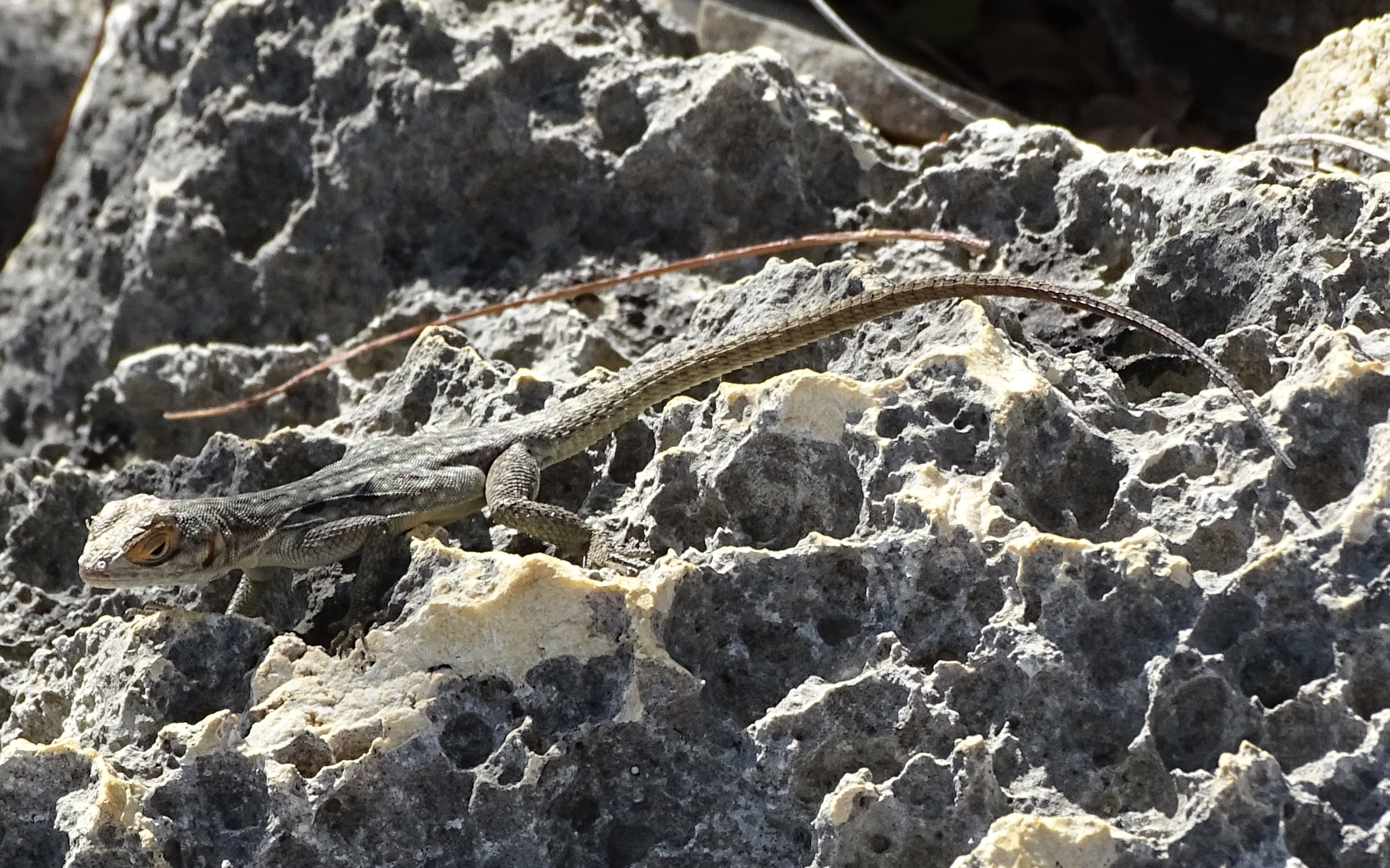
- Opulus saxicola with tail twice as long as body in Tsimanampetsotsa National Park

Conservation status
- Least Concern (IUCN 3.1)

Scientific classification
- Kingdom: Animalia
- Phylum: Chordata
- Class: Reptilia
- Order: Squamata
- Suborder: Iguania
- Family: Opluridae
- Genus: Oplurus
- Species: O. saxicola

Binomial name
- Oplurus saxicola (Grandidier, 1869)

= Oplurus saxicola =

Species of lizard

Oplurus saxicola (marked Madagascar swift) is a saxicolous (rock dwelling) iguana. The name of this species, saxicola, comes from the Latin saxum, meaning stone or rock, as they live within that environment.

== Description ==
Extremely depressed reddish-green body, with marked spots. White abdomen. Large throat. Eyes very large, of triangular form. The scales of the forefeet are webbed; the thighs of rear legs are muscular. Scales on the neck are of similar dimensions to those on the back.

== Distribution ==
The marked Madagascar swift is endemic to the province of Toliara in south-west Madagascar.
