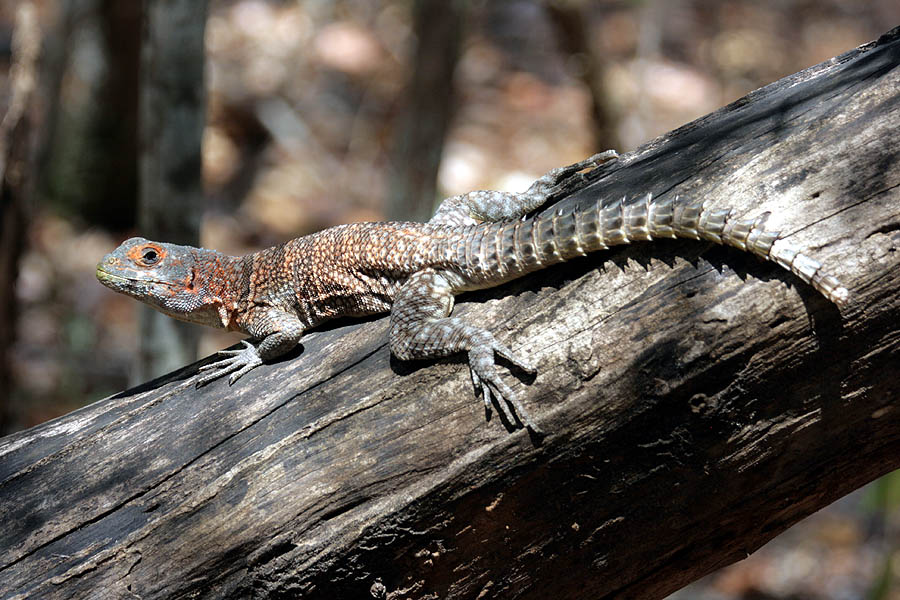
- Oplurus cuvieri

Scientific classification
- Kingdom: Animalia
- Phylum: Chordata
- Class: Reptilia
- Order: Squamata
- Suborder: Iguania
- Infraorder: Pleurodonta
- Family: Opluridae; Titus & Frost, 1996

Genera
- 2 genera (8 recognized species), see article

= Opluridae =

Family of lizards

The Opluridae, or Madagascan iguanas, are a family of moderately-sized lizards native to Madagascar and Grande Comore. There are eight species across two genera, with most of them being under Oplurus. The other genus, Chalarodon, is easily distinguishable from Oplurus as it contains species with a dorsal crest, particularly distinct in males, and has a smoother tail covered in similarly sized scales. Genus Oplurus has large segmented spiny scales, and no dorsal crest along the spine.

The Opluridae, along with the banded iguanas and their kin (family Iguanidae) of Fiji, are the only extant members of the Pleurodonta that are found outside of the Americas. The Opluridae family includes terrestrial species that live amongst rocks and canyons, along with some that are arboreal, and two that prefer sandier habitats. All of the species are oviparous, or egg-layers, and have teeth that resemble those of the true iguanas. A study to identify the primary foraging methods of the Oplurus genus indicated that ambush hunting was preferred due to the reptiles' low movement-per-minute (MPM) and percent-time-spent-moving (PTM) rates, especially during the very rainy and very dry seasons of the Ampijoroa Forest and Ankarafantsika.

Previously, due to their physical isolation from all other iguanids, it was thought that oplurids had very ancient/basal origins; a study of mitochondrial DNA sequences had put the split between Opluridae and Iguanidae—within which Opluridae is occasionally classified as subfamily Oplurinae—at about 165 million years ago (MYA), during the Middle Jurassic. This study supported the monophyly of the expanded Iguanidae, thus placing Oplurinae in the basal position—consistent with a vicariant origin of the Madagascan iguanians, as Madagascar is believed to have separated from Africa some 140 MYA during the breakup of Gondwana. However, a 2022 study found Opluridae to be the sister group to the Leiosauridae, a family of iguanids found only in South America. Both groups were found to have only diverged during the Paleocene, about 60 MYA. As this divergence was too recent to be a result of vicariance, it was proposed that the Opluridae colonized Madagascar via oceanic dispersal, floating on uprooted trees, shrubbery and other amalgamated natural objects directly to Madagascar from South America. Alternate theories see the reptiles reaching mainland Africa first, before later making their way to Madagascar, or floating from South America to Madagascar with Antarctica as a stopping-point (as the continent was not yet glaciated at the time).

== Species ==
Image	Genus	Living species
	Chalarodon Peters, 1854	Chalarodon madagascariensis Peters, 1854; Chalarodon steinkampi Miralles, Glaw, Ratsoavina & Vences, 2015
	Oplurus Cuvier, 1829	Oplurus cuvieri – Collared iguana (Gray, 1831); Oplurus cyclurus – Madagascar swift (Merrem, 1820); Oplurus fierinensis – Anzamala Madagascar swift Grandidier, 1869; Oplurus grandidieri – Grandidier's Madagascar swift (Mocquard, 1900); Oplurus quadrimaculatus – Duméril's Madagascar Swift Duméril & Bibron, 1851; Oplurus saxicola – Marked Madagascar swift (Grandidier, 1869)
