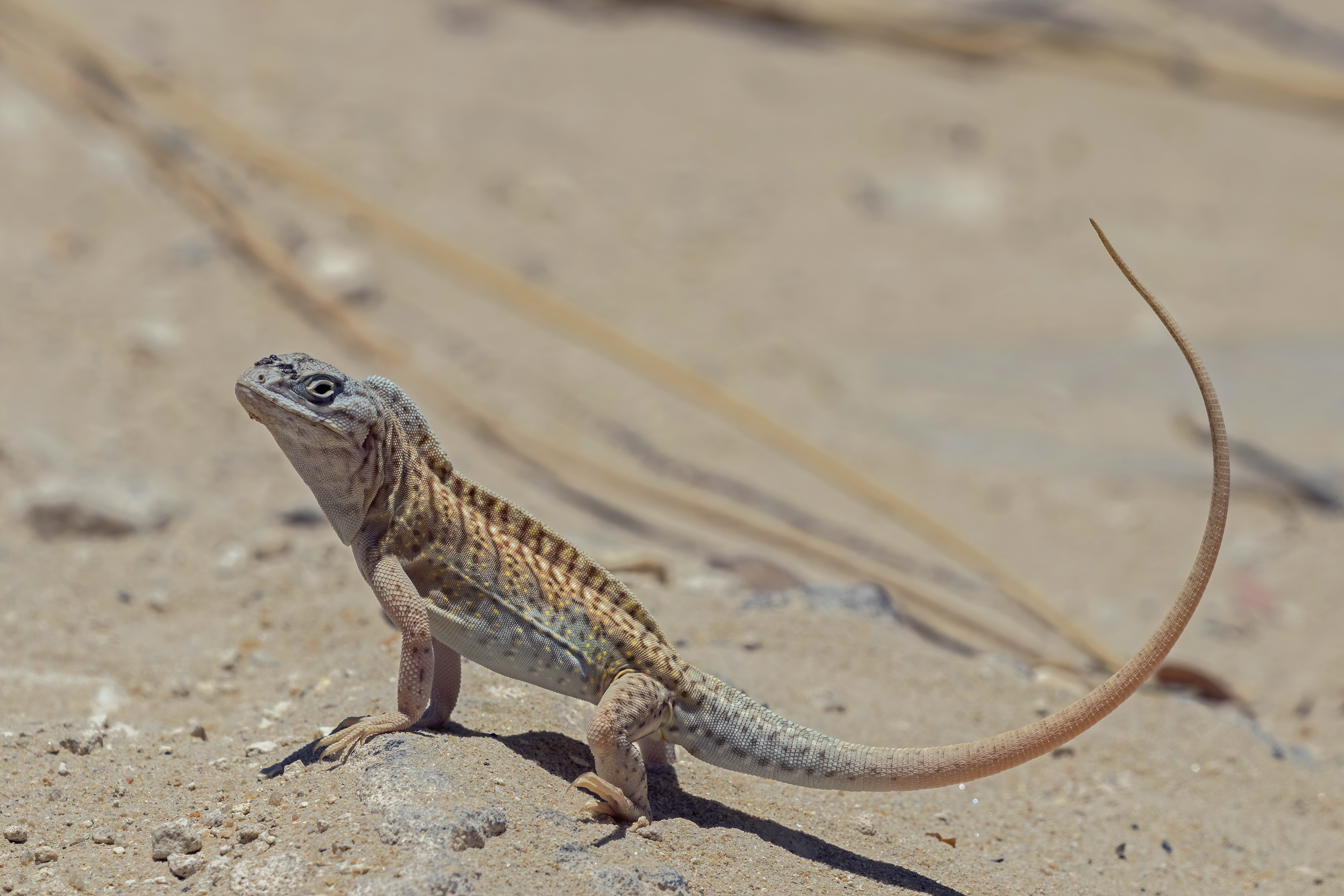
- male, Toliara

Scientific classification
- Kingdom: Animalia
- Phylum: Chordata
- Class: Reptilia
- Order: Squamata
- Suborder: Iguania
- Family: Opluridae
- Genus: Chalarodon; Peters, 1854

= Chalarodon =

Genus of lizards

Chalarodon is a genus of Malagasy terrestrial iguanian lizard. It was considered a monotypic genus, until in 2015 a second species, Chalarodon steinkampi, was recognised based on morphology and DNA sequence data. The common names of this genus include Chalarodon or Dangalia lizard.

Its Malagasy relatives are the iguanians of the genus Oplurus.

== Species ==
Two species of Chalarodon exist:

Image	Scientific name	Distribution
	Chalarodon madagascariensis Peters, 1854	Western, southern, and south eastern Madagascar
	Chalarodon steinkampi Miralles, Glaw, Ratsoavina & Vences, 2015	Eastern Madagascar

== Habitat ==
Members of this genus inhabit semi-arid to arid regions and almost entirely open, or very sparsely vegetated habitats with sandy soil in southern, western, and south eastern Madagascar.

== Nutrition ==
The Madagascar sand lizards are insectivores. In addition to insects, sometimes plants are ingested, particularly in the form of leaves and roots.

== Reproduction ==
During the mating season, males defend territories with threat displays and combat. Copulation is very brief, and females lay pairs of eggs between December and March.
