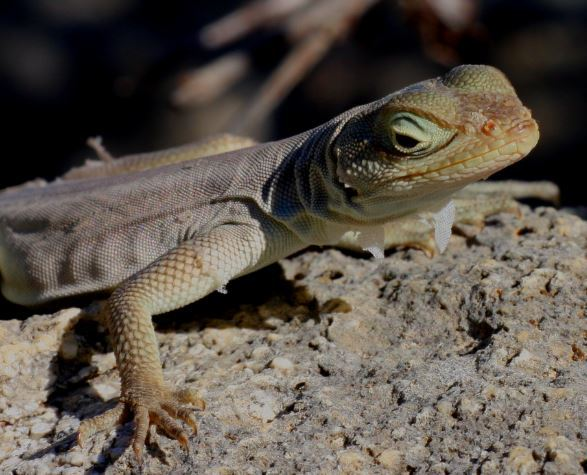
- Oplurus fierinensis

Conservation status
- Least Concern (IUCN 3.1)

Scientific classification
- Kingdom: Animalia
- Phylum: Chordata
- Class: Reptilia
- Order: Squamata
- Suborder: Iguania
- Family: Opluridae
- Genus: Oplurus
- Species: O. fierinensis

Binomial name
- Oplurus fierinensis Grandidier, 1869

Synonyms
- Hoplurus fierinensis (Grandidier, 1869)

= Oplurus fierinensis =

Species of lizard

Oplurus fierinensis, also known as the Anzamala Madagascar swift or Madagascar blue iguana, is a saxicolous (rock dwelling) iguana endemic to Madagascar.

== Description ==
As the name suggests, the Madagascar blue iguana is blue, although can be different shades of blue or grey, depending upon the lighting. The ventral side is plain gray. The coloration provided good camouflage while living among the blue-grey rocks. It can reach a total length of 28 cm.

== Distribution ==
This species is endemic to Madagascar and has been found in the region of Toliara in southwest Madagascar.
