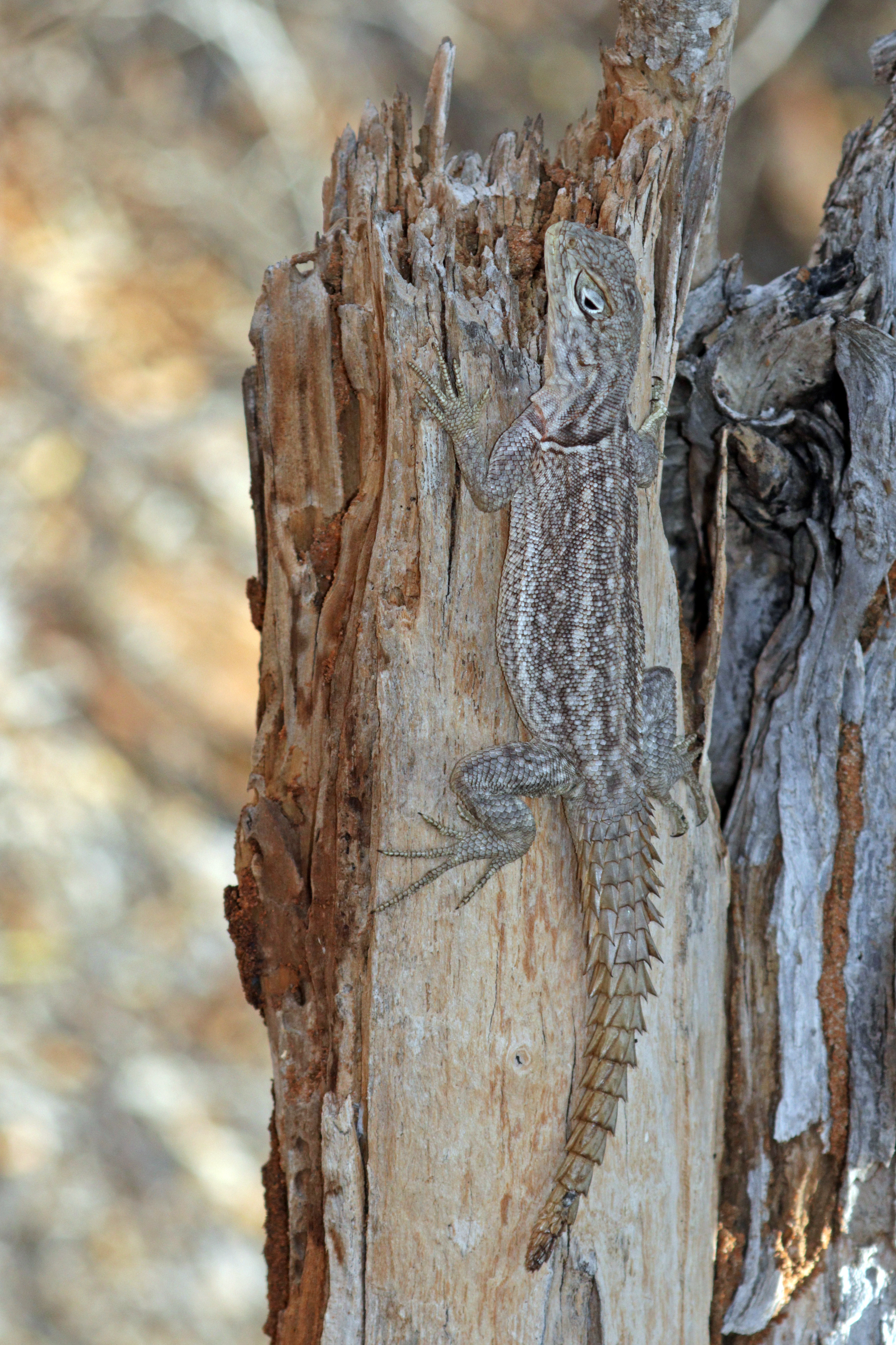
- In Reserve Reniala, Madagascar

Conservation status
- Least Concern (IUCN 3.1)

Scientific classification
- Kingdom: Animalia
- Phylum: Chordata
- Class: Reptilia
- Order: Squamata
- Suborder: Iguania
- Family: Opluridae
- Genus: Oplurus
- Species: O. cyclurus

Binomial name
- Oplurus cyclurus (Merrem, 1820)

Synonyms
- Uromastyx cyclurus Merrem, 1820; Oplurus maximiliani A.M.C. Duméril & Bibron, 1837; Doryphorus maximiliani — Fitzinger, 1843; Tropidurus cyclurus — Gray, 1845; Hoplurus cyclurus — W. Peters, 1882; Oplurus cyclurus — Savage, 1952

= Oplurus cyclurus =

Species of lizard

Oplurus cyclurus, also known commonly as the Madagascar swift and Merrem's Madagascar swift, is a species of lizard in the family Opluridae. The species is endemic to Madagascar. It is arboreal and mostly insectivorous. Its breeding is timed with the rainy season.

== Description ==
Oplurus cyclurus is similar in appearance to Oplurus cuvieri; the two species may be easily confused.

Oplurus cyclurus is slightly smaller than Oplurus cuvieri. Both species have a distinctive large spiny tail, and neither has a dorsal crest. Oplurus cyclurus has a dark brown or black band around the neck and similar paler markings on its back.

== Behavior, habitat, and geographic range ==
O. cyclurus is mostly arboreal, living in the spiny forests of southern and southwestern Madagascar.

== Reproduction ==
O. cyclurus is oviparous.
