= Janssen (Martian crater) =

Crater on Mars

Janssen Crater
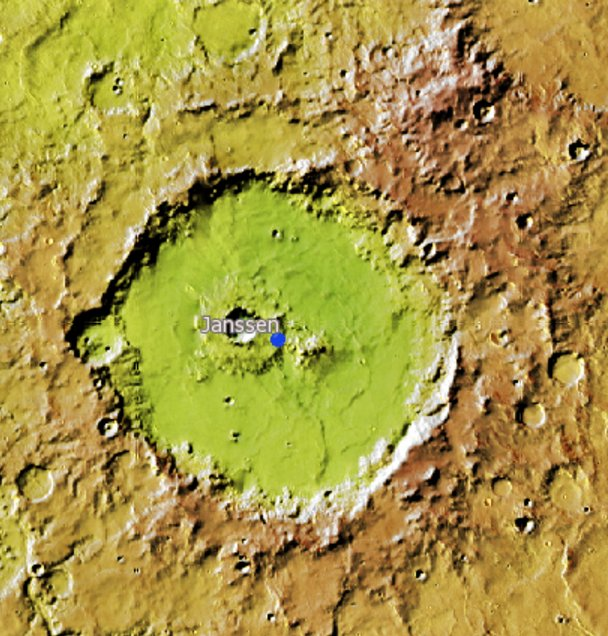
- Location of Janssen Crater
- Planet: Mars
- Region: Arabia quadrangle
- Coordinates: 2.7°N 37.6°E
- Quadrangle: Arabia
- Diameter: 154 km
- Eponym: Pierre Janssen

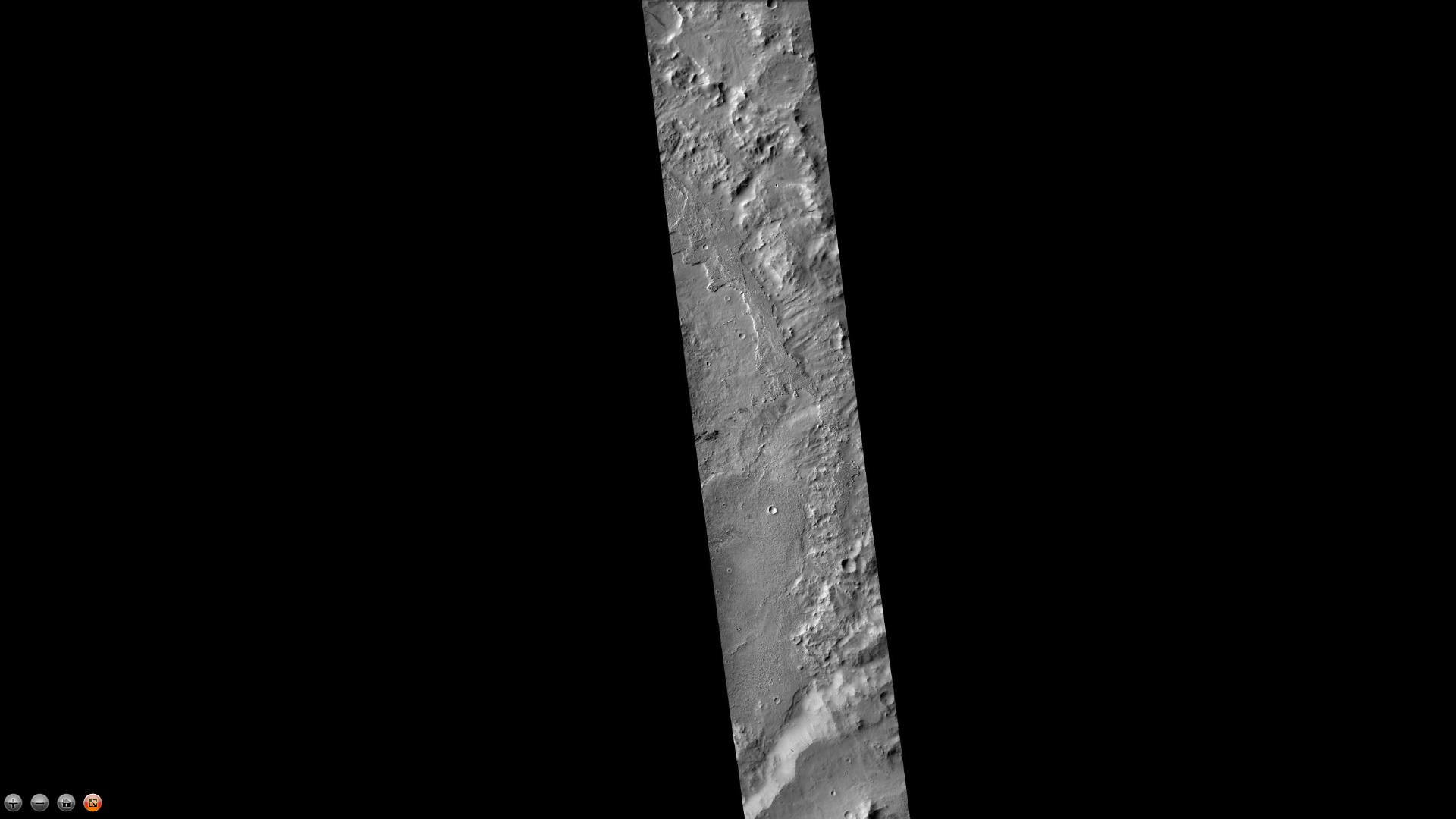
Eastern edge of Janssen Crater, as seen by CTX camera (on Mars Reconnaissance Orbiter).

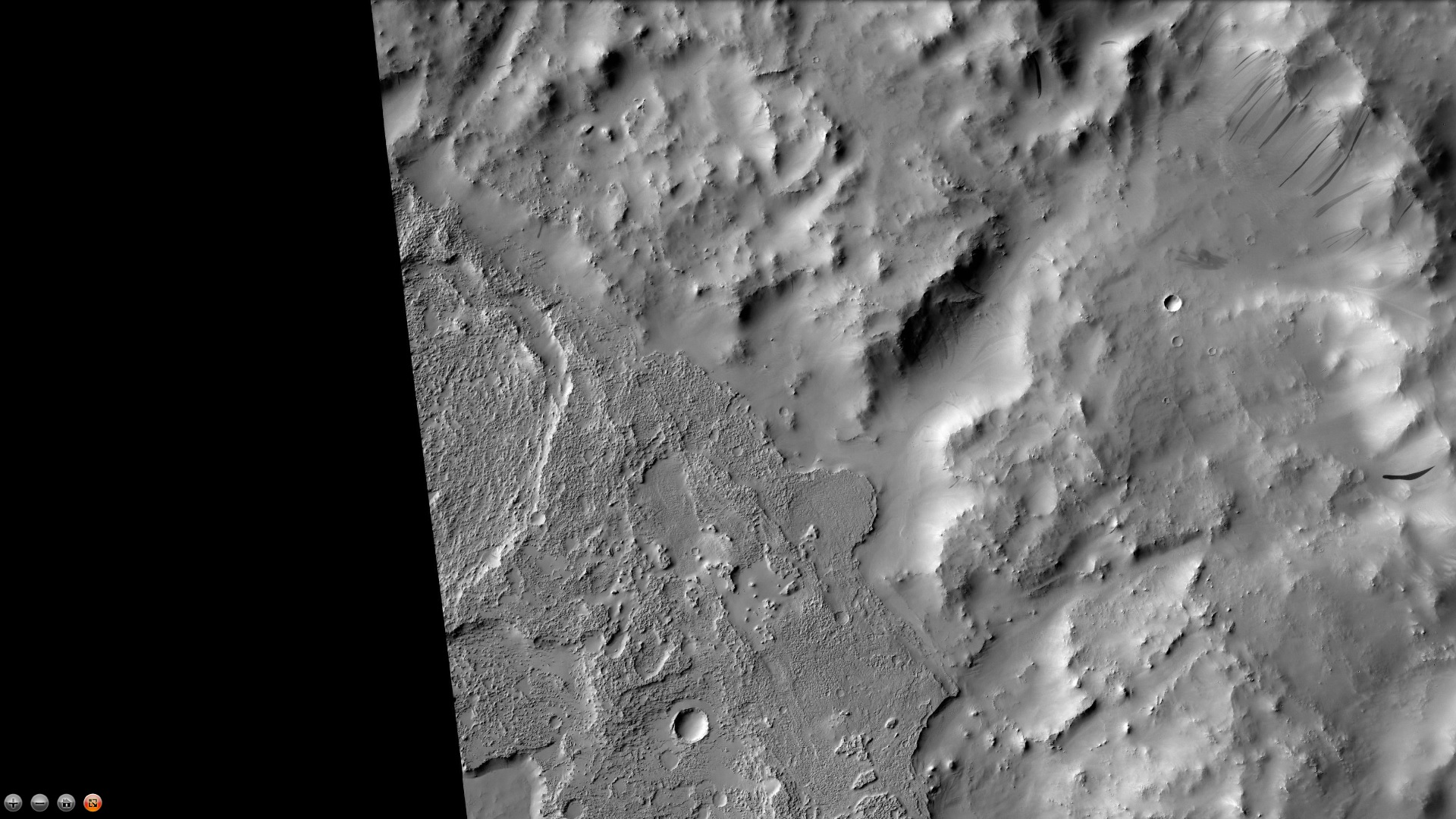
Layers and dark slope streaks in northeastern edge of Janssen Crater, as seen by CTX camera (on Mars Reconnaissance Orbiter). Note: this is an enlargement of the previous image of Janssen Crater.

Janssen Crater is an impact crater in the Arabia quadrangle on Mars at 2.7° N and 322.4° W. and is 154 km in diameter. Its name was approved in 1973, and refers to French astronomer Pierre Janssen. Some close up images of the crater reveal layers in a floor deposit. A picture below show these layers, as well as dark slope streaks. The darker the streak, the younger it is. The layers on the floor of Janssen may have been formed on the bottom of lakes.

== See also ==
- List of craters on Mars
