= 225 Henrietta =

Main-belt asteroid

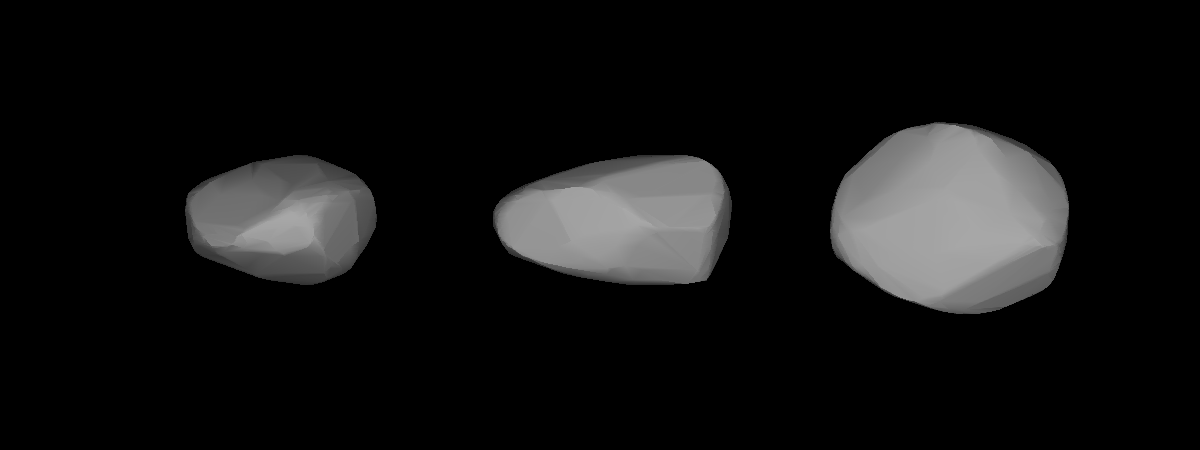
- Lightcurve-based 3D model of 225 Henrietta

Discovery
- Discovered by: Johann Palisa
- Discovery date: 19 April 1882

Designations
- Pronunciation: /hɛnriˈɛtə/
- Named after: Henrietta Jansen
- Alternative designations: A882 HA
- Minor planet category: Main belt (Cybele)

Orbital characteristics
- Epoch 31 July 2016 (JD 2457600.5)
- Uncertainty parameter 0
- Observation arc: 120.87 yr (44,148 d)
- Aphelion: 4.28364 AU (640.823 Gm)
- Perihelion: 2.4945 AU (373.17 Gm)
- Semi-major axis: 3.38907 AU (506.998 Gm)
- Eccentricity: 0.26396
- Orbital period (sidereal): 6.24 yr (2,278.9 d)
- Average orbital speed: 16.2 km/s
- Mean anomaly: 159.155°
- Mean motion: 0° 9^{m} 28.703^{s} / day
- Inclination: 20.872°
- Longitude of ascending node: 197.113°
- Argument of perihelion: 104.149°

Physical characteristics
- Dimensions: 120.49±2.5 km
- Mass: (3.1±3.0)×10^{18} kg (Note: Calculated from its standard gravitational parameter GM = 0.21±0.2 km^{3}/s^{2}.) (SB441)
- Mean density: 3.4±3.3 g/cm^{3} (calculated)
- Synodic rotation period: 7.3556 h (0.30648 d)
- Geometric albedo: 0.0396±0.002
- Spectral type: C
- Absolute magnitude (H): 8.72

225 Henrietta is a very large outer main-belt asteroid. It was discovered by Austrian astronomer Johann Palisa on 19 April 1882, in Vienna and named after Henrietta, wife of astronomer Pierre J. C. Janssen. The asteroid is orbiting at a distance of 3.39 AU from the Sun with a period of 6.24 years and an eccentricity (ovalness) of 0.26. The orbital plane is inclined at an angle of 20.9° to the plane of the ecliptic. 225 Henrietta belongs to Cybele group of asteroids.

This is classified as a C-type asteroid and is probably composed of primitive carbonaceous material. It has a very dark surface, with an albedo of 0.040. Photometric measurements made from the Oakley Southern Sky Observatory during 2012 gave a light curve with a period of 7.352±0.003 h and a variation in brightness of 0.18±0.02 in magnitude. This is consistent with a synodic rotation period of 7.356±0.001 h determined in 2000. In 2001, the asteroid was detected by radar from the Arecibo Observatory at a distance of 1.58 AU. The resulting data yielded an effective diameter of 128±16 km.
