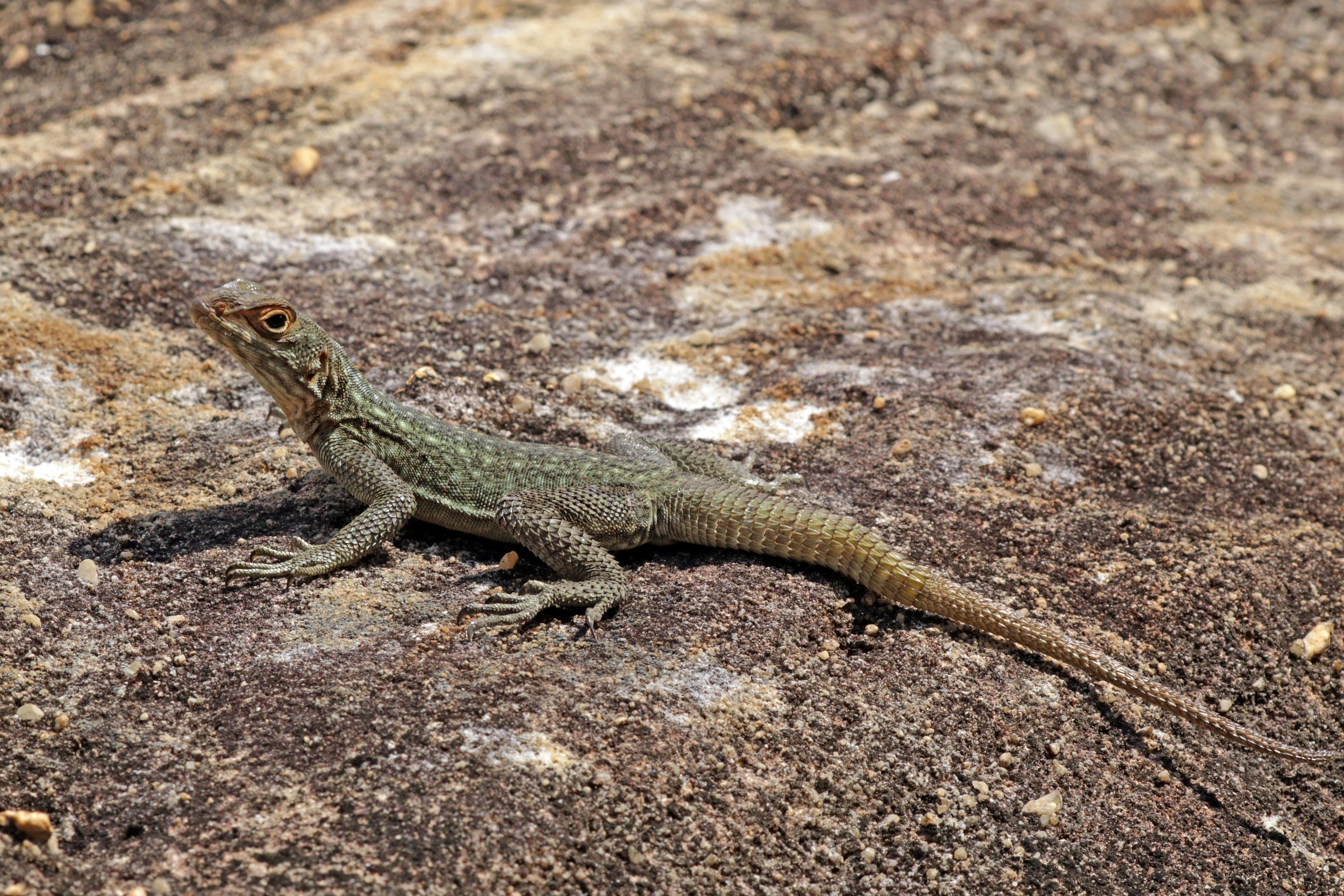
- near Isalo National Park

Scientific classification
- Kingdom: Animalia
- Phylum: Chordata
- Class: Reptilia
- Order: Squamata
- Suborder: Iguania
- Family: Opluridae
- Genus: Oplurus
- Species: O. maculatus

Binomial name
- Oplurus maculatus Duméril & Bibron, 1851

Synonyms
- Centrura quadrimaculatus (Duméril & Bibron, 1851); Hoplurus quadrimaculatus (Duméril & Bibron, 1851); Oplurus montanus Grandidier, 1869

= Oplurus quadrimaculatus =

Species of lizard

Oplurus quadrimaculatus, the Duméril's Madagascar Swift or Madagascar spotted spiny-tailed iguana, is a terrestrial malagasy iguana belonging to the family Opluridae.

== Description ==
Oplurus quadrimaculatus can reach a length of 25–39 centimetres (9.8–15.4 in). This iguana is greyish, with a spotted back and tail and legs covered with enlarged, spinous scales. It spends hours basking in sunlight. It is mainly insectivorous. Mating lasts just a few seconds and the eggs are laid in sheltered areas.

== Distribution ==
This species is endemic to Madagascar. It can be found from the central areas up to the south of the country, at an elevation up to 2,050 metres (6,730 ft) above sea level.

== Habitat ==
Madagascar spotted spiny-tailed iguana lives on loamy slopes, clay expanses and large rocks in various environment, from the arid regions in dry spiny forests to northern wetlands and humid areas close to the rainforest and in shrubland.

== Gallery ==
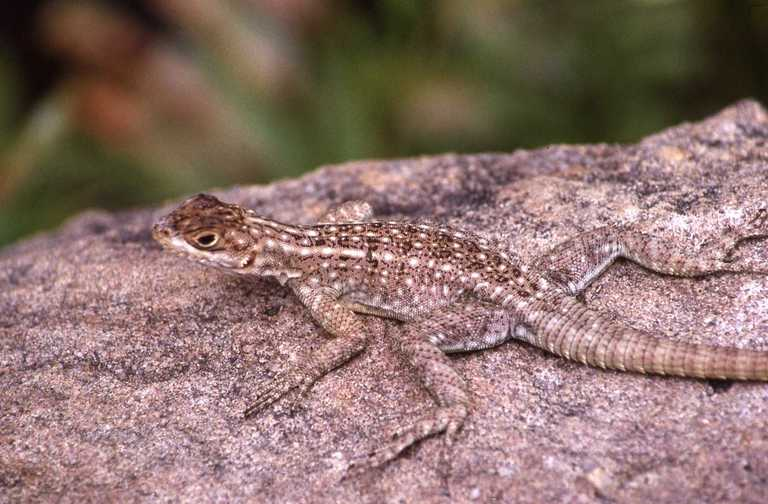
Isalo

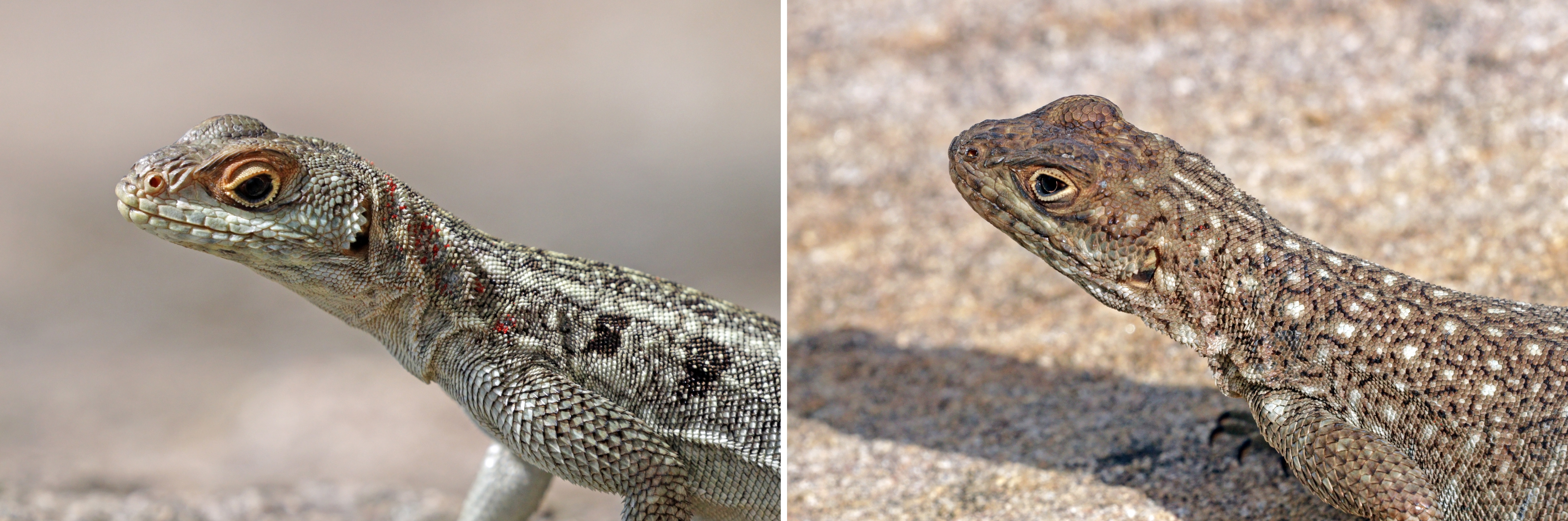
specimens from Anja Community Reserve (left), and near Isalo National Park (right)
