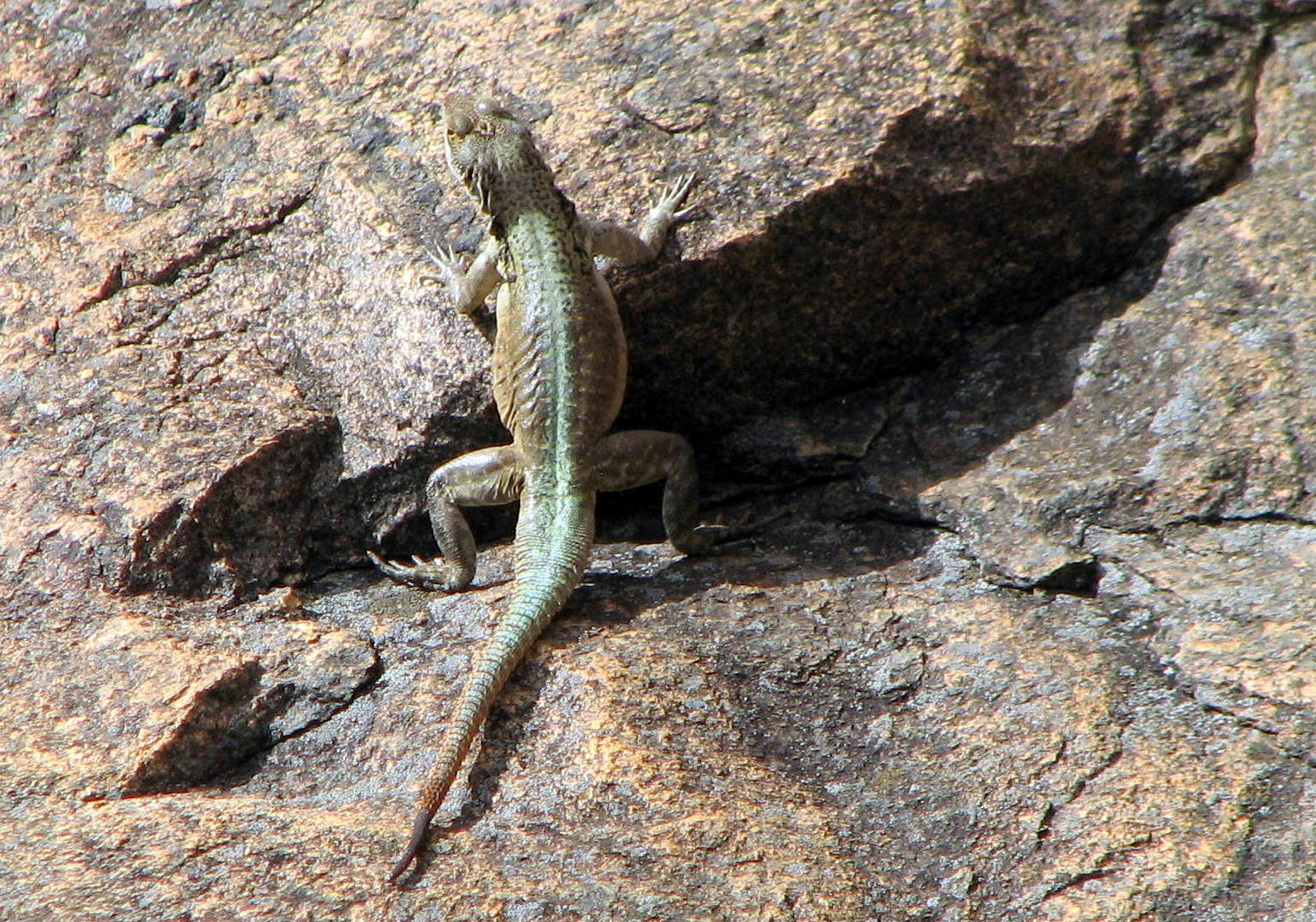
- Oplurus grandidieri, Anja Community Reserve

Conservation status
- Least Concern (IUCN 3.1)

Scientific classification
- Kingdom: Animalia
- Phylum: Chordata
- Class: Reptilia
- Order: Squamata
- Suborder: Iguania
- Family: Opluridae
- Genus: Oplurus
- Species: O. grandidieri

Binomial name
- Oplurus grandidieri (Mocquard, 1900)

Synonyms
- Hoplurus grandidieri Mocquard, 1900; Oplurus grandidieri — Savage, 1952

= Oplurus grandidieri =

Species of lizard

Grandidier's Madagascar swift (Oplurus grandidieri) is a species of saxicolous (rock dwelling) lizard in the family Opluridae. The species is endemic to Madagascar.

== Etymology ==
The specific name grandidieri, is in honor of French naturalist Alfred Grandidier.

== Description ==
Grandidier's Madagascar swift has a distinctive light mid-dorsal stripe.

== Geographic range ==
On the island of Madagascar, O. grandidieri has been found in a number of localities in the southern central highlands.

== Habitat ==
The preferred natural habitat of O. grandidieri is rocky areas in forest, shrubland, or grassland.

== Reproduction ==
O. grandidieri is oviparous.
