= Ernest Grandidier =

French industrialist (1833–1912)

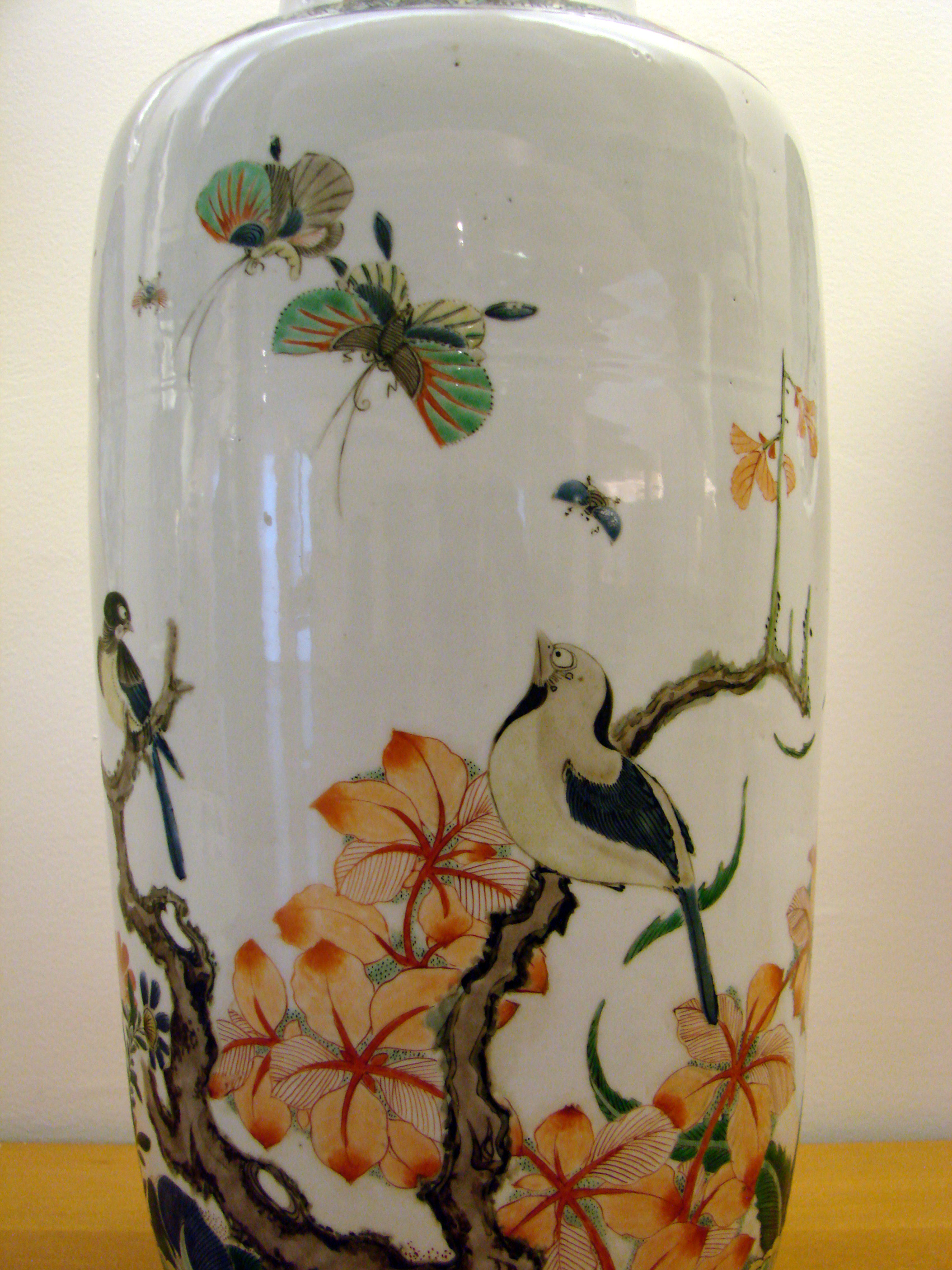
Vase, dynastie Qing, période Kangxi (1662-1722), 18ème siècle. Musée Guimet, Paris

Ernest Grandidier (2 December 1833 – 1 July 1912) was a French industrialist, naturalist and art collector.

The Grandidier family was very wealthy and in 1857 Ernest Grandidier, with his brother Alfred (1836–1921) and tutor Jules Janseen, went on a voyage to the Americas. Leaving Paris they travelled to Liverpool, then to North America, travelling in Canada then crossing the United States to New Orleans. After the five months M. Janssen fell ill and returned to France but the two brothers continued their journey going on to South America in 1858 and 1859. They went to Bolivia and Peru, where they explored the mineral mining regions and Inca sites, Chile and the passes between Santiago and Buenos Aires. They returned to France with extensive geological, zoological and botanical collections. Ernest published an account of their travels and collections in 1861 as Voyages dans Amerique du Sud, Perou et Bolivie (Paris, J. Claye for Michel Levy Freres).

Ernest Grandidier was later appointed Auditeur at the Conseil d'État. After 1870, he travelled to Asia and India and became a specialist of Chinese art. He donated a large portion of his collection of porcelains to the Louvre Museum in 1894. It is now in the Guimet Museum in Paris.

He wrote La Ceramique Chinoise, Porcelain Orientale Paris Librairie De Firmin-Didto Et Cie (1894) and many articles on Chinese ceramics.

He was a very keen photographer, taking pictures of all of his travels and the peoples he encountered. The Guimet holds his photographic archive.

== Bibliography ==
- Xavier Besse, 2001 A passion for Chinese ceramics : The story of the Ernest Grandidier collection or Une passion pour la céramique chinoise : L'histoire de la collection Ernest Grandidier Chinese department of the Musée Guimet, FRANCE ISSN 0030-5448
