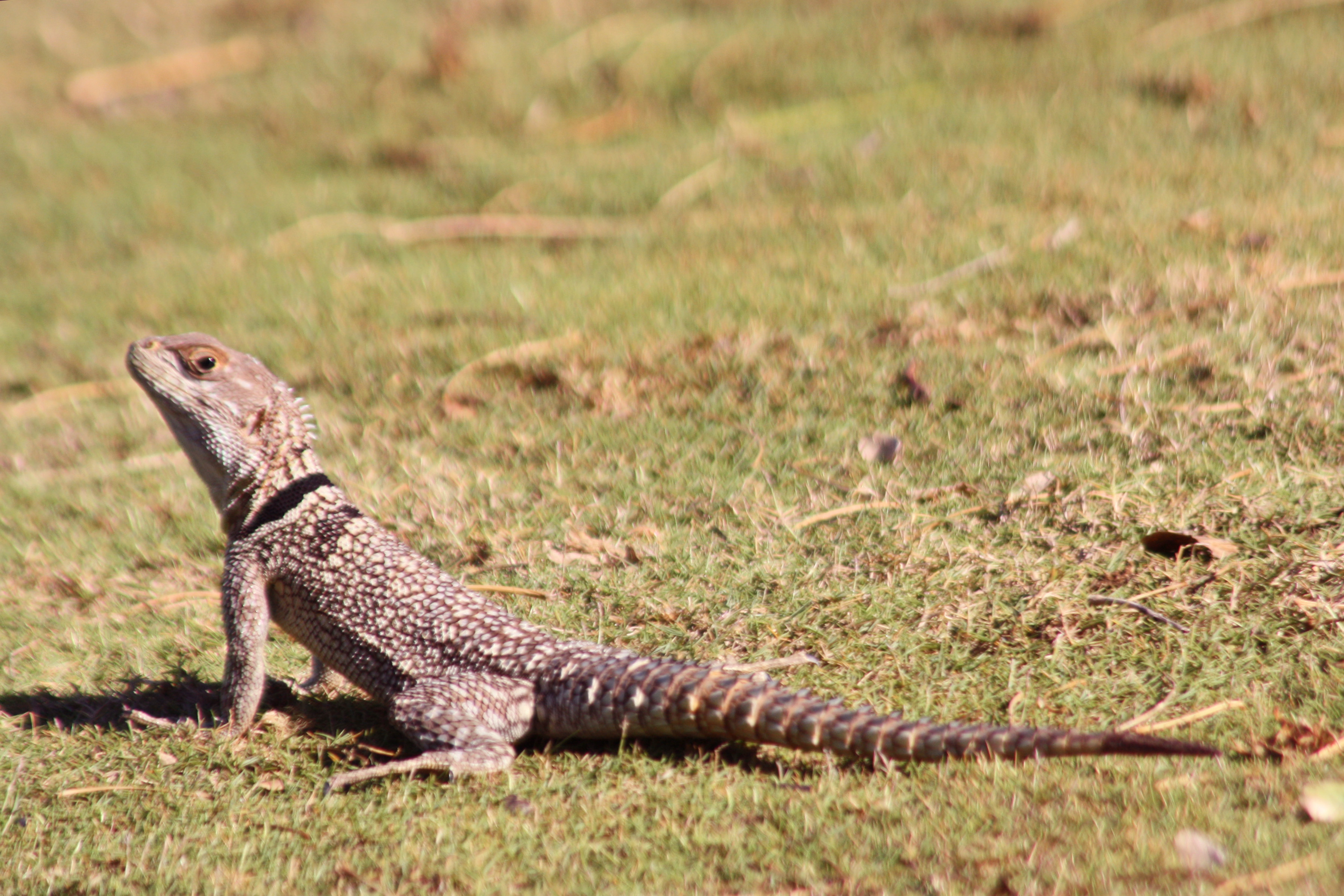
- At Anjajavy Forest, Madagascar

Conservation status
- Least Concern (IUCN 3.1)

Scientific classification
- Kingdom: Animalia
- Phylum: Chordata
- Class: Reptilia
- Order: Squamata
- Suborder: Iguania
- Family: Opluridae
- Genus: Oplurus
- Species: O. cuvieri

Binomial name
- Oplurus cuvieri (Gray, 1831)

Synonyms
- Oplurus torquatus Cuvier, 1829 (nomen oblitum); Tropidurus cuvieri Gray, 1831 (nomen substitutum); Oplurus sebae A.M.C. Duméril & Bibron, 1837; Hoplurus sebae — Fitzinger, 1843; Oplurus cuvieri — Savage, 1952

= Oplurus cuvieri =

Species of lizard

Oplurus cuvieri, commonly known as the collared iguana, the collared iguanid lizard, Cuvier's Madagascar skink, Cuvier's Madagascar swift, and the Madagascan collared iguana, is a species of arboreal lizard in the family Opluridae. The species is native to Madagascar and the island of Grande Comore, Comoros. There are two recognized subspecies. O. cuvieri is the largest of six species in the genus Oplurus.

== Etymology ==
The specific name, cuvieri, is in honor of French naturalist Georges Cuvier.

== Description ==
As some of the common names suggest, O. cuvieri has a distinctive black collar that stands out against the body which is speckled with lighter spots. It has a large head, and the relatively short tail has spiny scales. The female is a duller brown colour.

The average length of O. cuvieri is 16 in. and the average weight is 160 – 190 g.

The images below show considerable variation in markings and coloration.

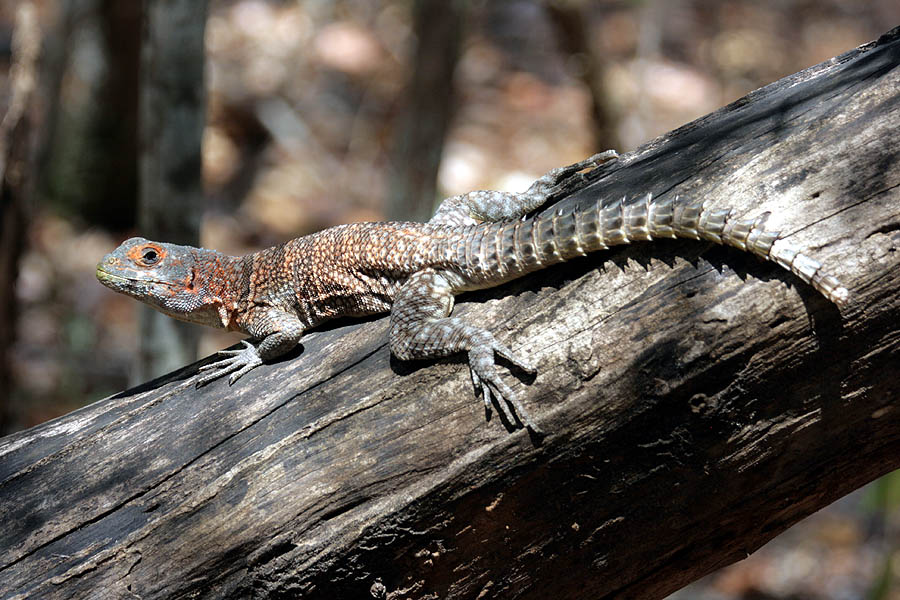
At Kirindy Forest

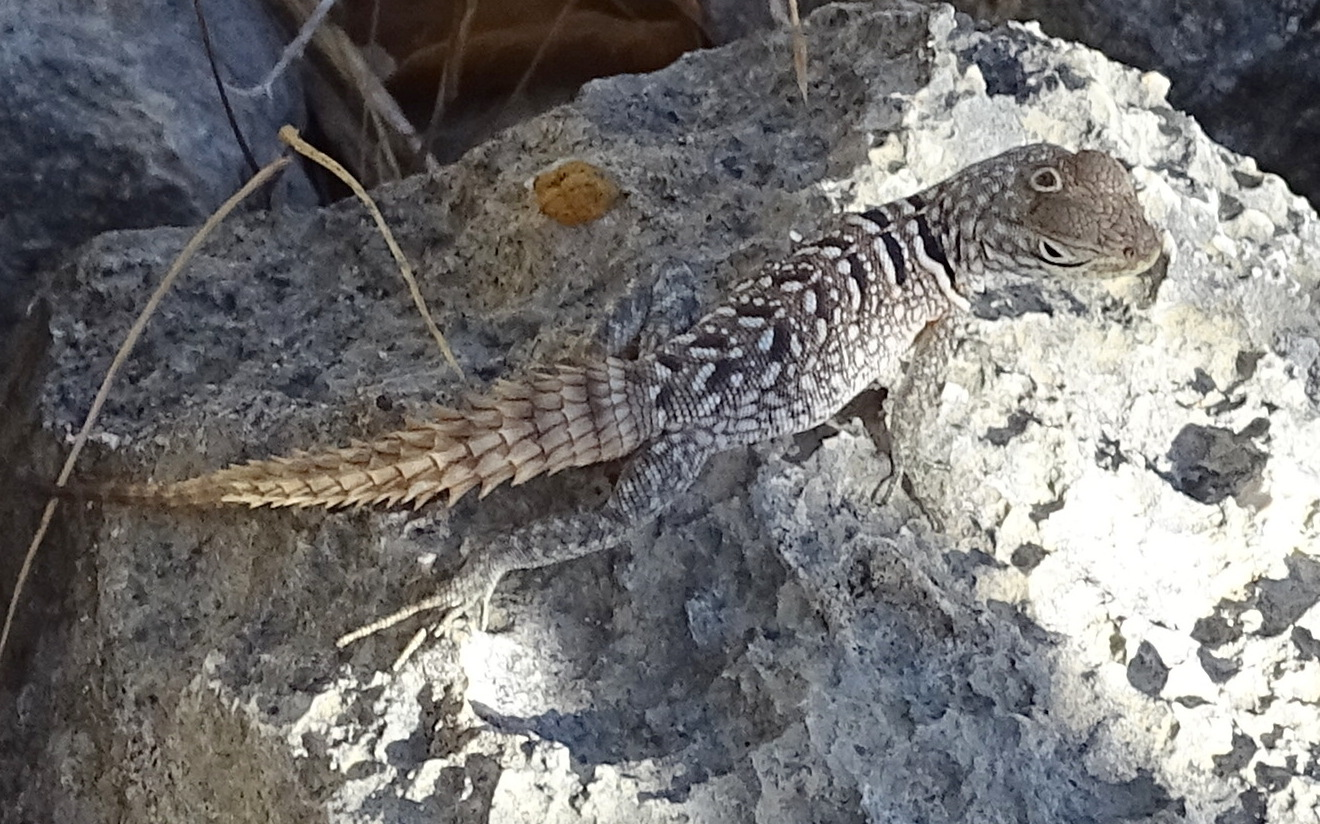
At Tsimanampetsotsa National Park, showing a false eye on top of head

== Geographic range ==
The collared iguana is found in the western tropical forests of Madagascar and on the island of Grand Comore in Comoros.

== Subspecies ==
Two subspecies are recognized as being valid, including the nominotypical subspecies.

- Oplurus cuvieri cuvieri (Gray, 1831) – Madagascar
- Oplurus cuvieri comorensis Angel, 1942 – Grand Comore Island

Nota bene: A trinomial authority in parentheses indicates that the subspecies was originally described in a genus other than Oplurus.

== Diet ==
O. cuvieri has a mostly carnivorous and insectivorous diet, consuming an array of invertebrates such as arachnids, beetles, crickets, grasshoppers and other insects, as well as isopods and various larvae, earthworms, etc. Opportunistically, they may prey upon very small juvenile lizards, snakes or amphibians, as well as occasional hatchling birds, bird eggs or newborn rodents.

== Behavior ==
This diurnal iguana species is primarily arboreal and spends much of its time gripping trunks and branches where it remains motionless while it scans the surrounding area for insects.

Once It sees the prey, the lizard will run rapidly to capture it before it can escape. Madagascar Collared Lizards have also been observed positioning themselves near an ant trail where they can gain an easy meal by picking up the ants one by one. Occasionally, they may also eat plant matter such as flowers.

This lizard is territorial, found alone or in an area with one male and a few females.

When threatened, it will retreat into a crack or crevice in a tree trunk, and use its armored tail to form a barrier between itself and the predator.

== Reproduction ==
The Madagascar collared iguana is estimated to reach sexual maturity around 2-3 years of age. The breeding season of the species is in-accordance with the arrival of the rainy season, and nesting typically occurs just after the first heavy rains. Males spar with one another over the females, often leading to injury or even death. The females dig shallow burrows, about 10 cm (4") deep, in exposed areas where there is no major vegetation, so as to provide maximum sunlight and warmth to the nest (often on or adjacent to a man-made or animal-worn forest trail). After laying her clutch (typically 2-5 eggs), the female lizard backfills her nest with the loose, excavated soil for insulation; she covers the nest area with sand, leaves and twigs for further concealment. Like many reptiles, she then leaves the nest permanently, with neither parent providing any degree of care for the hatchlings.

After incubating for 60-70 days, the young lizards hatch from their eggs, leave the nest and immediately seek cover, as they are at their most vulnerable when small. Nevertheless, the hatchlings are self-sufficient, finding sustenance in small, appropriately-sized invertebrates, such as ants and termites, before gradually advancing to larger prey species. Females may lay several clutches per year.

== Conservation ==
There is no data on the number of individuals in the wild and no known conservation measures in place for this species. Its habitat in the forests of Madagascar, however, faces a number of threats which may impact this iguana; this includes the burning of forests for agricultural expansion and the exploitation of trees for timber and charcoal.

In addition, because of their shallow, unprotected nesting sites, the eggs are heavily preyed upon by other reptiles, most notably the Malagasy giant hognose snake.
