= Chalarodon steinkampi =

Scientific classification
- Kingdom: Animalia
- Phylum: Chordata
- Class: Reptilia
- Order: Squamata
- Suborder: Iguania
- Family: Opluridae
- Genus: Chalarodon
- Species: C. steinkampi

Binomial name
- Chalarodon steinkampi Miralles, Glaw, Ratsoavina & Vences, 2015

Species of lizard

Chalarodon steinkampi is a species of Malagasy terrestrial iguanian lizards. It was recognised as a new species in 2015, which is probably microendemic to a small area in south eastern Madagascar.

== Habitat ==
The species inhabits areas very similar to its sister species, Chalarodon madagascariensis: semi-arid to arid regions with sandy soil that are mostly open.

== Distribution ==
This species is currently only known from two locations: a locality 30 km north of Amboasary, and Esomony.

== Morphology ==
Calarodon steinkampi is a cryptic species. It is easiest distinguished from C. madagascariensis by its unkeeled gular and ventral scales, which are keeled in the latter species. Other subtle differences include the mental scale being in contact with four postmentals (rather than 5–8), slightly shorter limbs, and fewer spines in its dorsal crest.

== Nutrition ==
The Madagascar sand lizards are insectivores. In addition to insects, sometimes plants are ingested, particularly in the form of leaves and roots.
