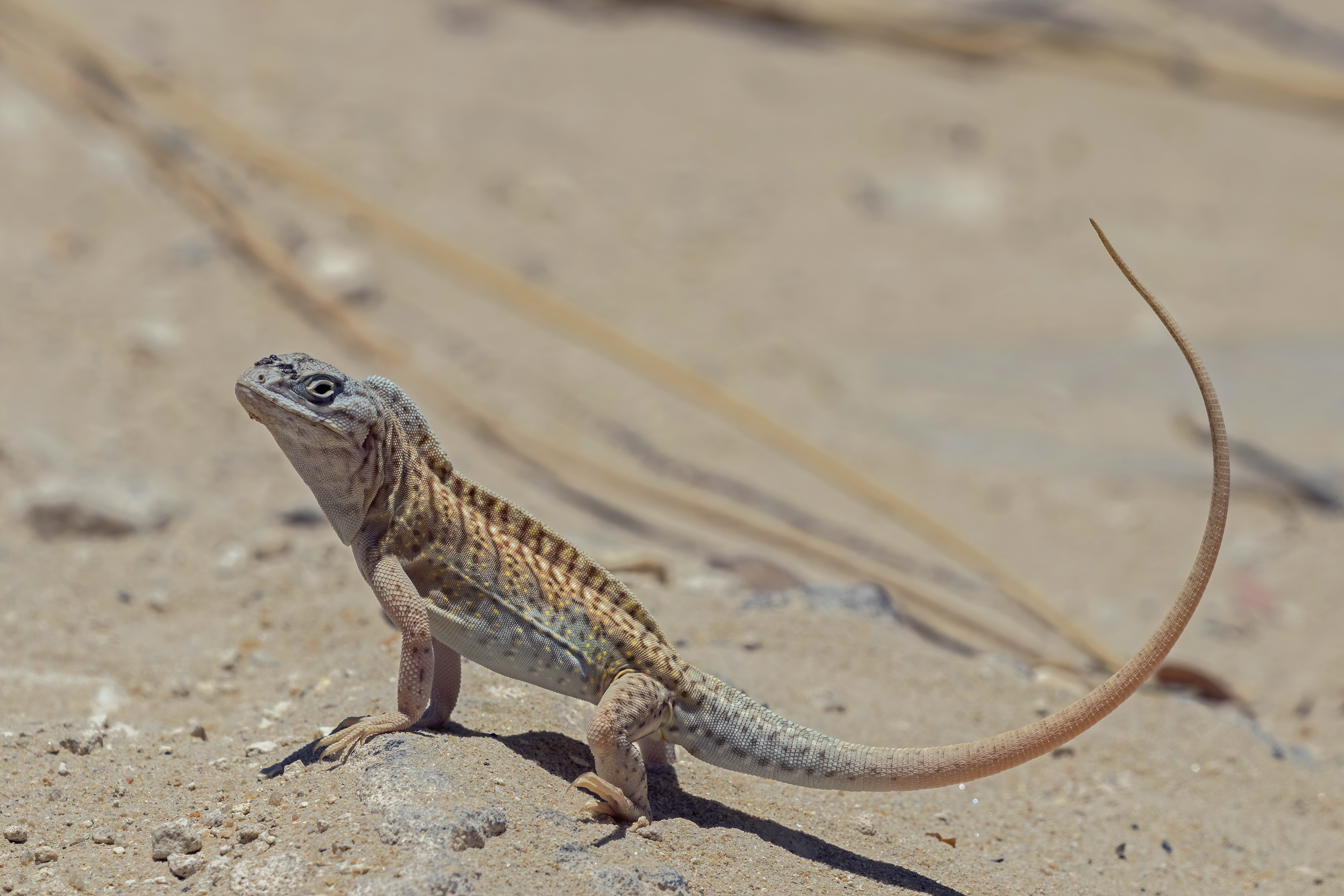
- male
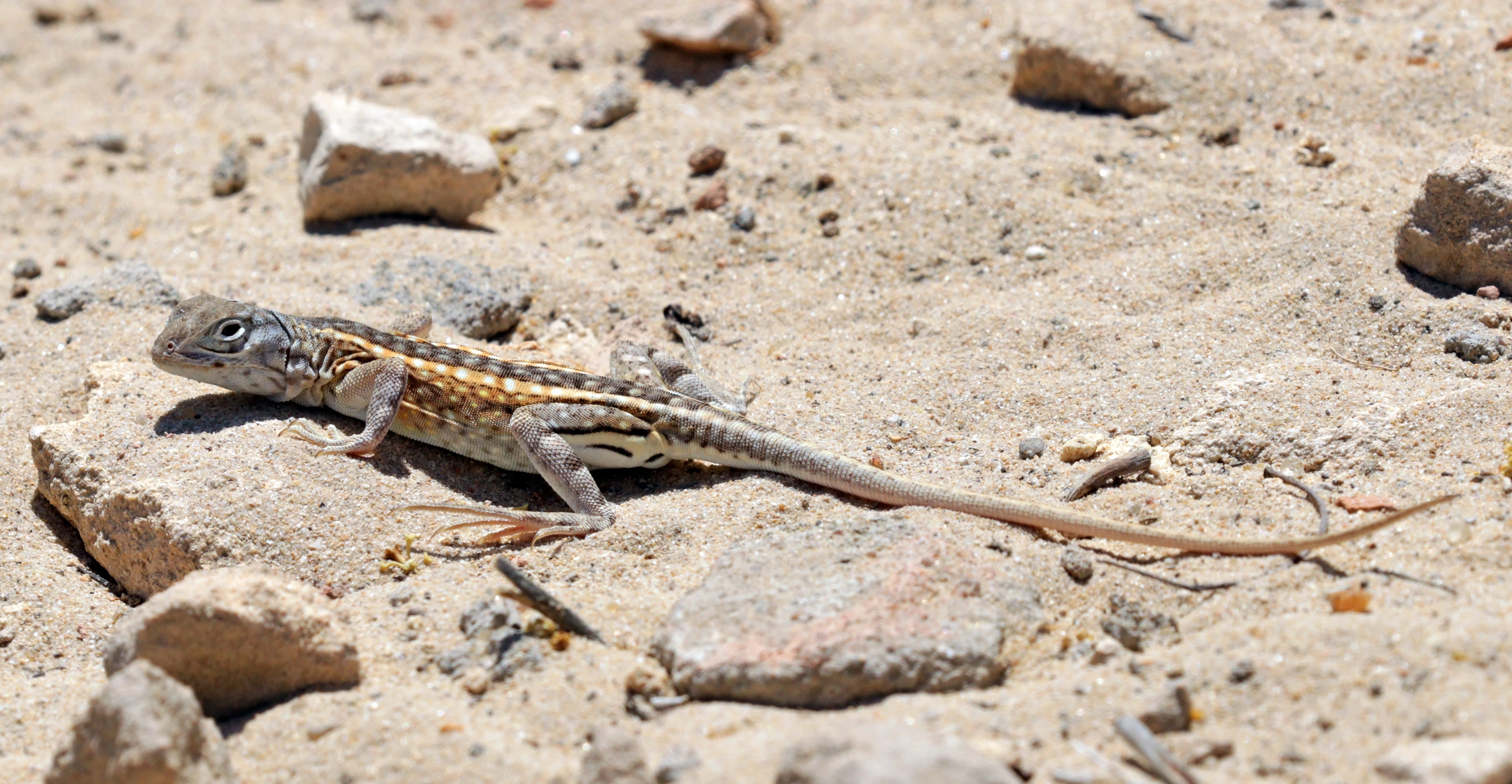
- female both Toliara, Madagascar

Conservation status
- Least Concern (IUCN 3.1)

Scientific classification
- Kingdom: Animalia
- Phylum: Chordata
- Class: Reptilia
- Order: Squamata
- Suborder: Iguania
- Family: Opluridae
- Genus: Chalarodon
- Species: C. madagascariensis

Binomial name
- Chalarodon madagascariensis Peters, 1854

= Chalarodon madagascariensis =

Species of lizard

Chalarodon madagascariensis is a species of Malagasy terrestrial iguanian lizard native to western, southern, and south eastern Madagascar. Until 2015, it was thought to be the only member of its genus, but a second species, C. steinkampi was recognised in 2015. It is not yet clear if the distributional range of these two species overlaps.

== Habitat ==
The species inhabits mainly coastal, semi-arid to arid regions and almost entirely open, or very sparsely vegetated habitats with sandy soil in the province of Toliara, and in the southwestern provinces of Fianarantsoa and Majunga in the southwest of Madagascar.

== Distribution ==
This species is widespread in western, southern, and eastern Madagascar.

== Morphology ==
Calarodon madagascariensis is most easily distinguished from C. steinkampi by its keeled gular and ventral scales, which are unkeeled in the latter species. Total length is up to 223mm, usually about 200mm.

== Nutrition ==
The Madagascar sand lizards are insectivores. In addition to insects, sometimes plants are ingested, particularly in the form of leaves and roots.
