= Janssen revolver =

Early astronomical camera system

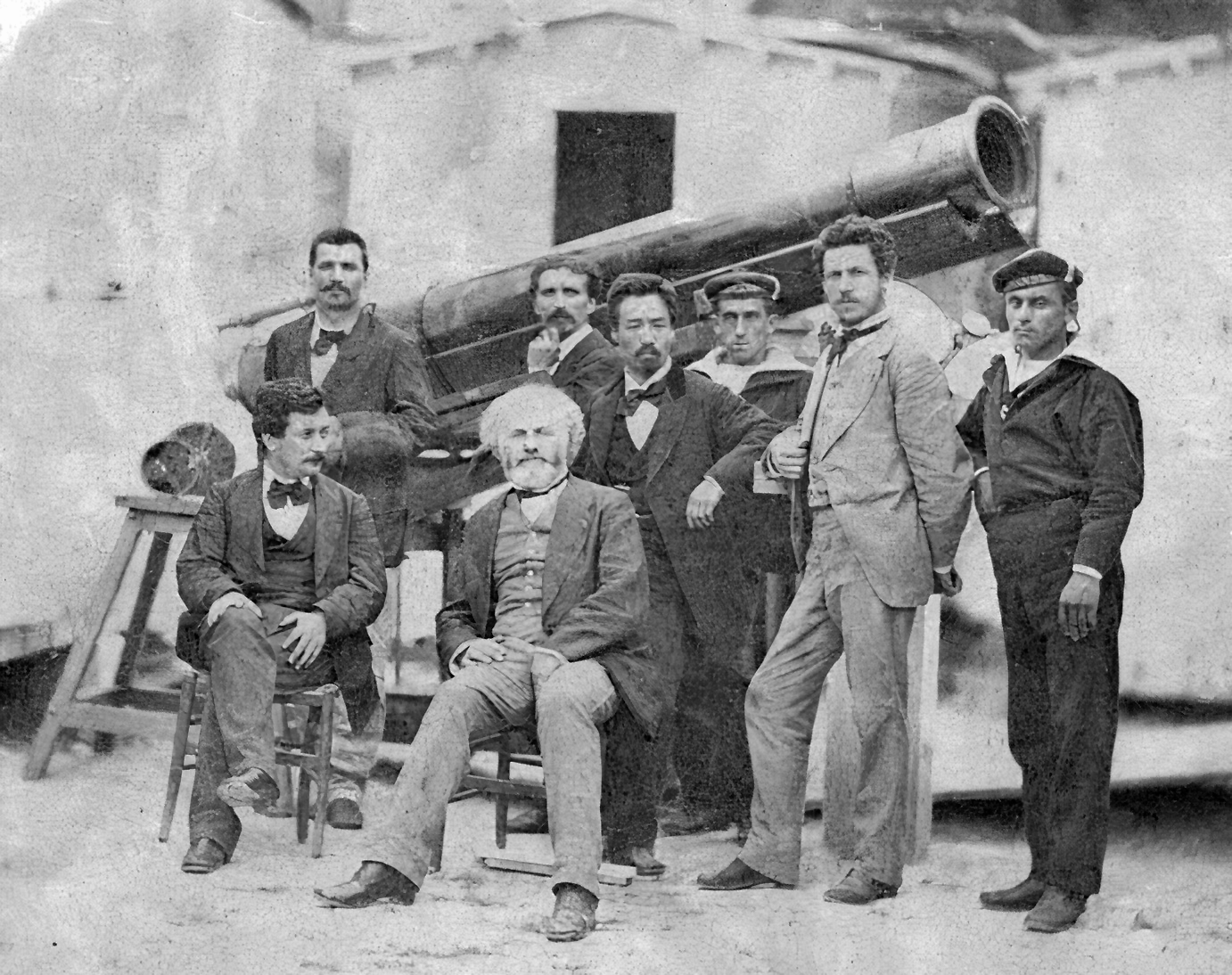
Janssen (center, sitting) and his 1874 crew, with the revolver in the background

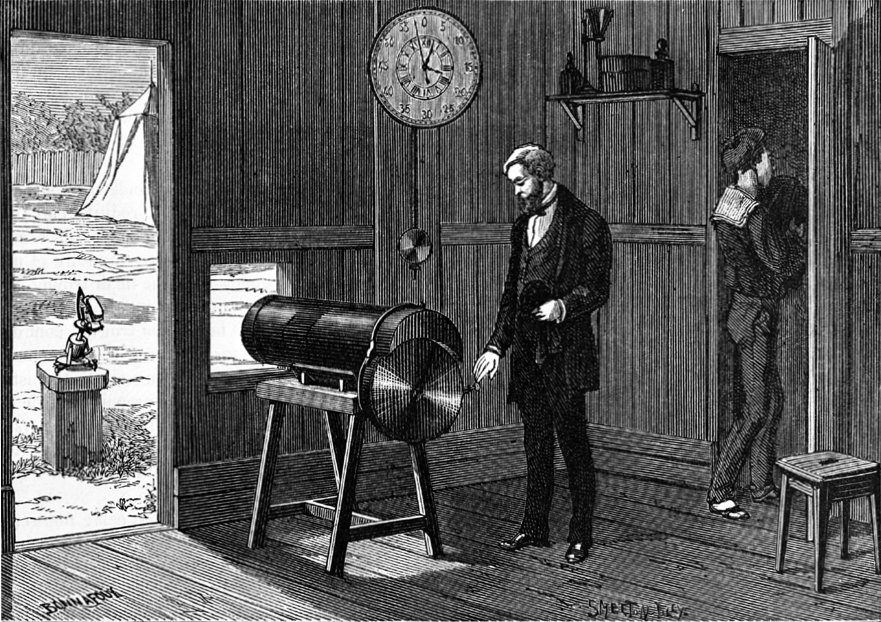
The revolver in action in a 1874 illustration

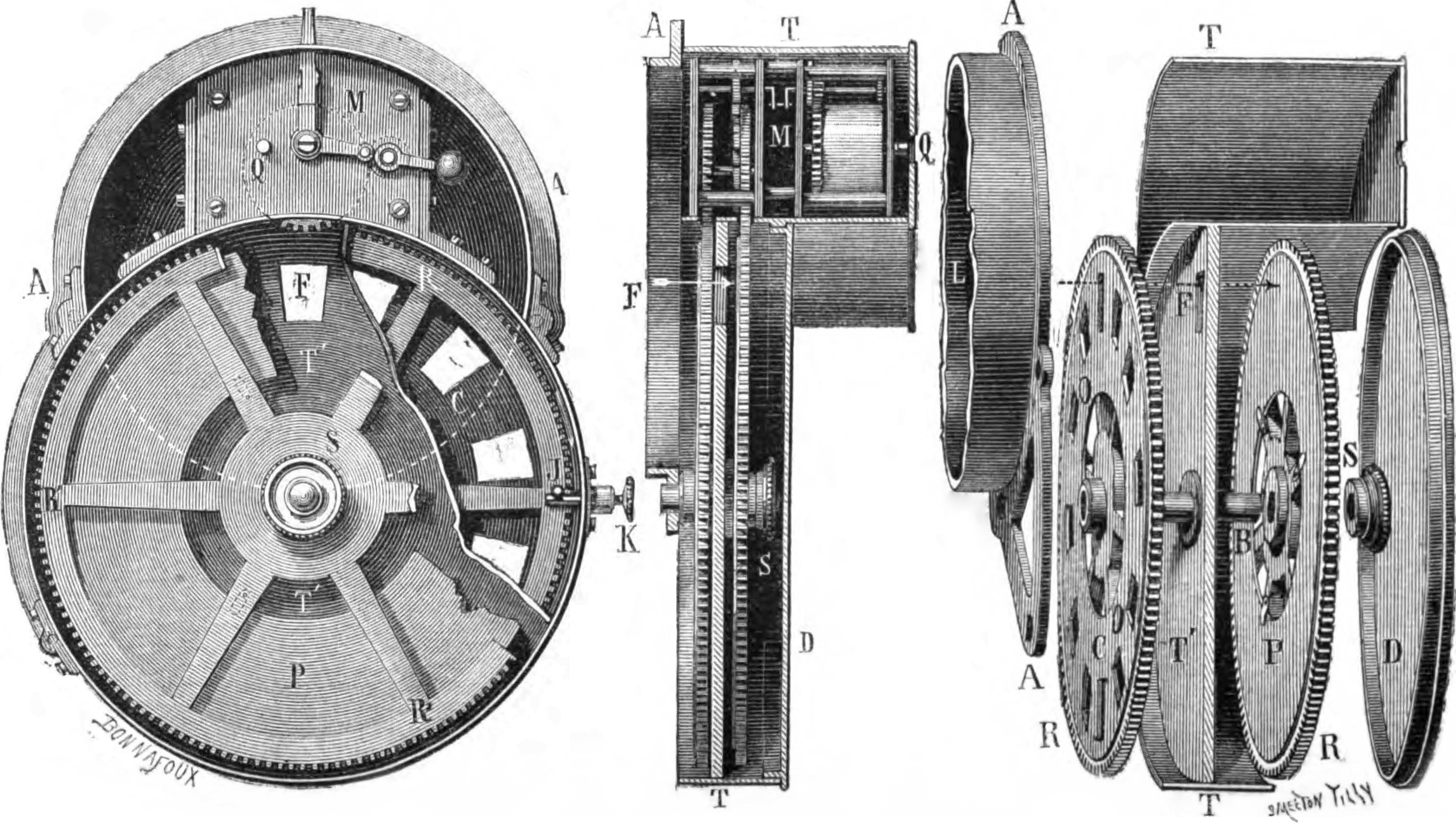
Detailed view of the instrument

The Janssen revolver (French: revolver photographique) was invented by the French astronomer Pierre Jules César Janssen in 1874. It was the instrument that originated chronophotography, a branch of photography based on capturing movement from a sequence of images. To create the apparatus Pierre Janssen was inspired by the revolving cylinder of Samuel Colt's revolver.

== Usage ==
The revolver used two discs and a sensitive plate, the first with twelve holes (shutter) and the second with only one, on the plate. The first one would take a full turn every eighteen seconds, so that each time a shutter window passed in front of the window of the second (fixed) disk, the sensitive plate was discovered in the corresponding portion of its surface, creating an image. In order for the images not to overlap, the sensitive plate rotated with a quarter of the shutter speed. The Shutter Speed was one and a half seconds. A mirror on the outside of the apparatus reflected the movement of the object towards the lens that was located in the barrel of this photographic revolver. When the revolver was in operation it was capable of taking forty-eight images in seventy-two seconds.

== History ==
In the mid-nineteenth century, one of the scientific challenges of the moment was to determine with the greatest accuracy possible the distance between the Earth and the Sun, the so-called Astronomical Unit, which indicates the size of the Solar System. At that time, the only way to know it was through the astronomical phenomenon of Venus transit: the passage of Venus ahead of the Sun, which required two simultaneous observations being made at a time from different land latitudes and measure the total duration of the event. With this data and applying the laws of Kepler, which describe the behavior of planetary orbits, the distance with the rest of the planets of the Solar System could be obtained.

The method had two drawbacks: the frequency of the phenomenon and technical problems of getting the start and end of the transit. The Venus transit in 1874 was a unique opportunity, which was why more than sixty co-ordinated expeditions from up to ten countries were dispatched to locations in China, Vietnam, New Caledonia, some Pacific islands and Japan. The distortion caused by the terrestrial atmosphere, the diffraction of the telescopes, the subjectivity of the observer and the "black drop effect" (an optical effect that distorts the silhouette of Venus just in the instant that enters and leaves the solar disk) meant the attempt faced huge technical challenges, which had previously been insurmountable. Janssen's invention of the photographic revolver was designed in an attempt to overcome these difficulties.

== Application ==
Janssen tested the device with the support of the French government in Nagasaki (Japan). As the exact moment in which the transit of Venus would take place was impossible to predict, he added a watch set to create a sequence of images. The revolver recorded 48 photographs in 72 seconds in a daguerreotype, material that was no longer used but was ideal for the sunlight that was presented in the situation, since it could capture the light in a great time of exposure and obtain clearer results.

The British expeditions photographed the transit from different geographic points by using apparatuses inspired by the revolver of Janssen. Unfortunately, the quality of the resulting images of the two expeditions was not sufficient to accurately calculate the Astronomical Unit, and the observations were more reliable at eye. Even so, Janssen introduced his revolver to the Société Francaise de Photographie in 1875 and the Académie des Sciences in 1876, to which he suggested the possibility of using his apparatus for the study of the animal movement, especially of the birds, because of the rapidity of the movement of their wings.

== Legacy ==
In 1882, the physiologist Etienne-Jules Marey concluded that a galloping horse would have four legs in the air at a certain moment. Four years previously, Eadweard Muybridge was the first to record the movement of living beings, in The Horse in Motion, with 12 serialized cameras that allowed him to play and even project those photographs in a row. The action was not being reconstructed from the point of view of an observer, but from a camera that accompanied the subject - such as a tracking shot - and in which, in each photograph, the action had a different viewpoint. Marey, based on the invention of Janssen, managed to solve these problems with his 1882 photo gun, which captured 12 small photos on a circular plate and at regular intervals. This improvement allowed the image to be captured by a fragile glass plate, so that it was no longer used by the impractical daguerreotype, thus reducing the exposure time. It was, therefore, the first camcorder, although it still had certain differences of conception with the later camcorders: On one hand, the obtained images had as a goal the decomposition of the movement for its study, and not for their projection; and on the other hand, being obtained on a glass disk, the duration of the action that could be recorded was necessarily very short.

Both inventions were a first step in the development of the first film cameras, but they can not be considered as such because their main objective was not the projection of films, but to study movement as a result of its decomposition.
