= Pierre Janssen =

French astronomer (1824–1907)

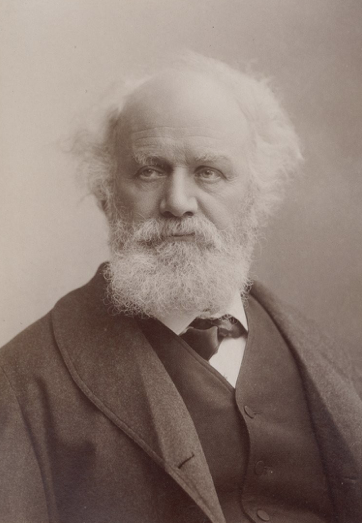
- Jules Janssen; photograph by Nadar (date unknown)
- Born: 22 February 1824; Paris, France
- Died: 23 December 1907 (aged 83); Meudon, France
- Scientific career
- Fields: Astronomy
- Thesis: Sur l'absorption de la chaleur rayonnante obscure dans les milieux de l'oeil (1860)

Pierre Jules César Janssen (22 February 1824 – 23 December 1907), usually known as Jules Janssen, was a French astronomer who, along with English scientist Joseph Norman Lockyer, is credited with discovering the gaseous nature of the solar chromosphere, and with some justification the element helium.

== Life, work, and interests ==
Passage de Venus (1874)

Janssen was born in Paris (During Bourbon Restoration in France) into a cultivated family. His father, César Antoine Janssen (born in Paris, 1780 – 1860) was a well known clarinettist from Dutch/Belgian descent (his father, Christianus Janssen, emigrated from Walloon Brabant to Paris). His mother Pauline Marie Le Moyne (1789 – 1871) was a daughter of the architect Paul Guillaume Le Moyne.

Pierre Janssen studied mathematics and physics at the faculty of sciences. He taught at the Lycée Charlemagne in 1853, and in the school of architecture 1865 – 1871, but his energies were mainly devoted to various scientific missions entrusted to him. Thus in 1857 he went to Peru in order to determine the magnetic equator; in 1861–1862 and 1864, he studied telluric absorption in the solar spectrum in Italy and Switzerland; in 1867 he carried out optical and magnetic experiments at the Azores; he successfully observed both transits of Venus, that of 1874 in Japan, that of 1882 at Oran in Algeria; and he took part in a long series of solar eclipse-expeditions, e.g. to Trani, Italy (1867), Guntur, India (1868), Algiers (1870), Siam (1875), the Caroline Islands (1883), and to Alcossebre in Spain (1905). To see the eclipse of 1870, he escaped from the Siege of Paris in a balloon. Unfortunately the eclipse was obscured from him by cloud.

In the year 1874, Janssen invented the Revolver of Janssen or Photographic Revolver, the instrument that originated chronophotography. Later this invention was of great use for researchers like Etienne Jules Marey to carry out exhibitions and inventions.

== Discovery of helium ==
In 1868 Janssen discovered how to observe solar prominences without an eclipse. While observing the solar eclipse of 18 August 1868, at Guntur, Madras State (now in Andhra Pradesh), British India, he noticed bright lines in the spectrum of the chromosphere, showing that the chromosphere is gaseous. Present in the spectrum of the Sun, though not immediately noticed or commented upon, was a bright yellow line later measured to have a wavelength of 587.49 nm. This was the first observation of this particular spectral line, and one possible source for it was an element not yet discovered on the earth. From the brightness of the spectral lines, Janssen realized that the chromospheric spectrum could be observed even without an eclipse, and he proceeded to do so.

On 20 October, Joseph Norman Lockyer in England set up a new, relatively powerful spectroscope. He also observed the emission spectrum of the chromosphere, including the same yellow line. Within a few years, he worked with a chemist and they concluded that it could be caused by an unknown element, after unsuccessfully testing to see if it were some new type of hydrogen. This was the first time a chemical element was discovered on an extraterrestrial body before being found on the earth. Lockyer and the English chemist Edward Frankland named the element after the Greek word for the Sun, ἥλιος (helios).

== Observatories ==
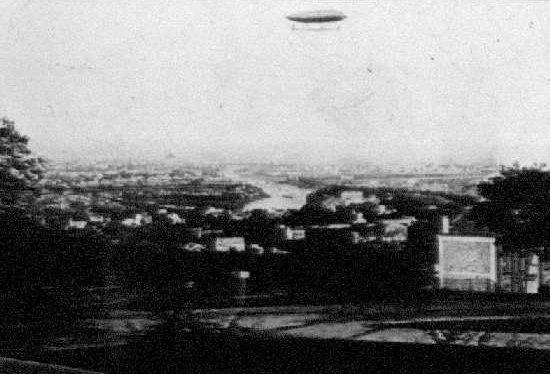
Photo taken by Janssen, from the Meudon observatory, of Renard and Krebs' La France dirigible (1885)

At the great Indian eclipse of 1868 that occurred in Guntur, Janssen also demonstrated the gaseous nature of the red prominences, and devised a method of observing them under ordinary daylight conditions. One main purpose of his spectroscopic inquiries was to answer the question whether the Sun contains oxygen or not. An indispensable preliminary was the virtual elimination of oxygen-absorption in the Earth's atmosphere, and his bold project of establishing an observatory on the top of Mont Blanc was prompted by a perception of the advantages to be gained by reducing the thickness of air through which observations have to be made. This observatory, the foundations of which were fixed in the hard ice that appeared to cover the summit to a depth of over ten metres, was built in September 1893, and Janssen, in spite of his sixty-nine years, made the ascent and spent four days making observations.

In 1875, Janssen was appointed director of the new astrophysical observatory established by the French government at Meudon, and set foot on there in 1876 the remarkable series of solar photographs collected in his great Atlas de photographies solaires (1904). The first volume of the Annales de l'observatoire de Meudon was published by him in 1896. (see also Meudon Great Refractor)

Janssen was the President of the Société Astronomique de France (SAF), the French astronomical society, from 1895 to 1897.

== International Meridian Conference ==
In 1884 he took part in the International Meridian Conference.

== Death, honors, and legacy ==
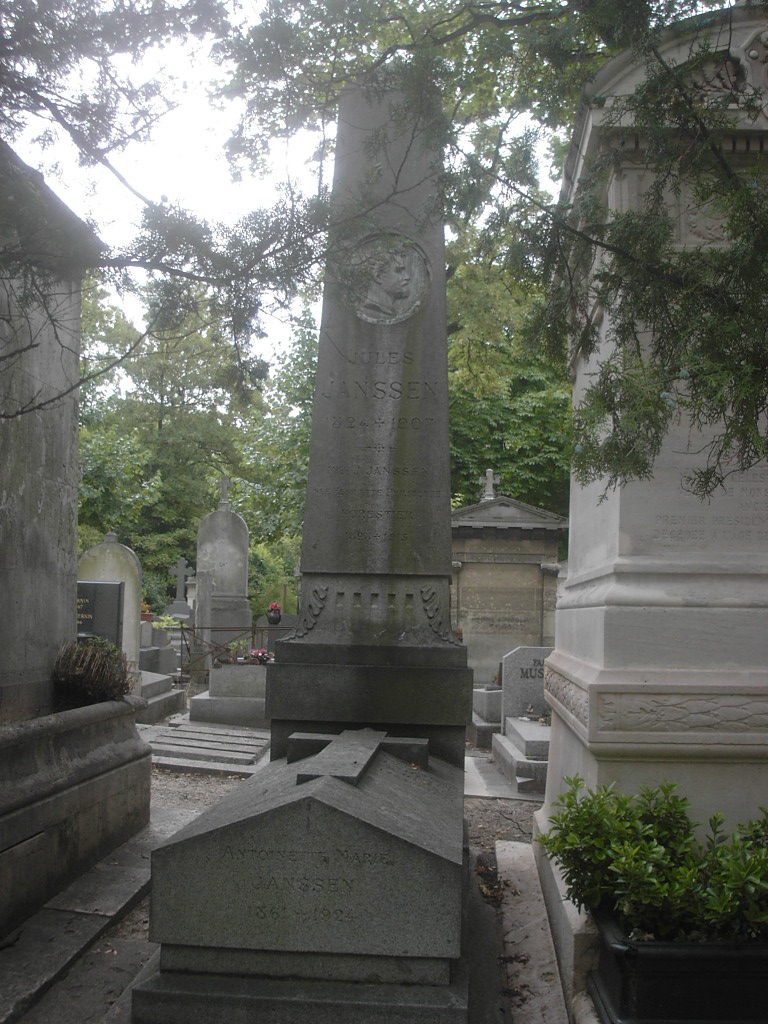
Janssen's grave in Paris

Janssen died at Meudon on 23 December 1907 and was buried at Père Lachaise Cemetery in Paris, with the name "J. Janssen" inscribed on his tomb. During his life he was made a Knight of the Legion of Honor and a Foreign Member of the Royal Society of London.

Craters on both Mars and the Moon are named in his honor. The public square in front of Meudon Observatory is named Place Jules Janssen after him. Two major prizes carry his name: the Prix Jules Janssen of the French Astronomical Society, and the Janssen Medal of the French Academy of Sciences.

Janssen named minor planet 225 Henrietta discovered by Johann Palisa, after his wife, Henrietta.
