= Alfred Grandidier =

French naturalist and explorer (1836–1921)

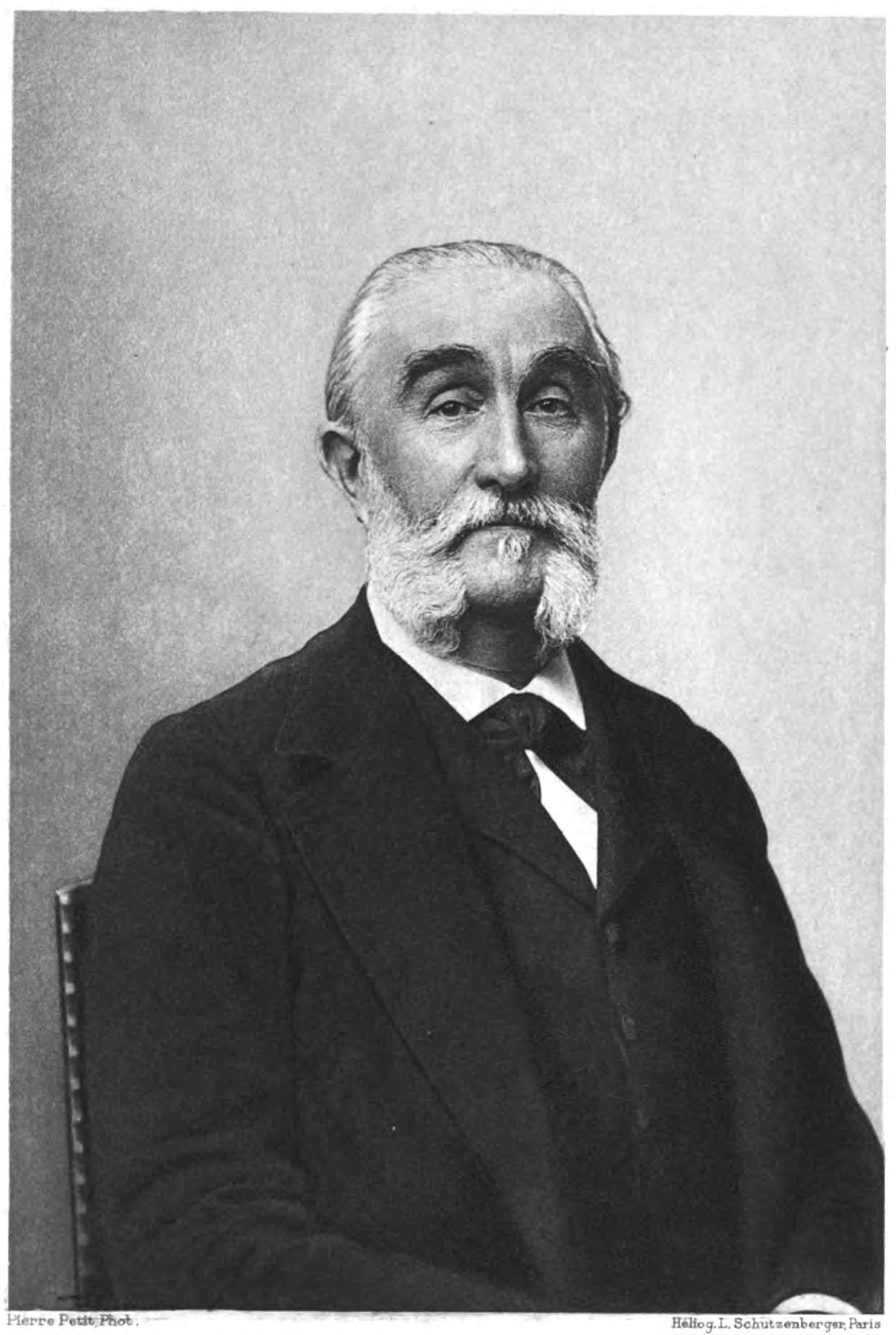
- Born: 20 December 1836; Paris, France
- Died: 13 September 1921 (aged 84); Paris, France
- Known for: Studies of Madagascar, L'Histoire physique, naturelle et politique de Madagascar
- Children: Guillaume Grandidier
- Relatives: Ernest Grandidier (brother)
- Awards: French Academy of Sciences, Founder's Medal of the Royal Geographical Society
- Scientific career
- Fields: Natural history
- Author abbrev. (botany): Grandid.
- Author abbrev. (zoology): A. Grandidier

Alfred Grandidier (French pronunciation: [alfʁɛd ɡʁɑ̃didje]; 20 December 1836 – 13 September 1921) was a French naturalist and explorer from a very wealthy family.

At the age of 20, he and his brother, Ernest Grandidier (1833–1912), undertook a voyage around the world. At first they were led by the astronomer and physicist Pierre Jules César Janssen (1824–1907), but when Janssen fell sick and had to return to France after about six months, the brothers continued the journey.

They visited South America in 1858 and 1859 and in particular the Andes, Peru, Chile, Bolivia, Argentina and Brazil. During this voyage they gathered a significant collection of specimens which were analyzed, in 1860, by Ernest.

The two brothers parted ways after this. Ernest Grandidier went to China and collected a vast number of specimens which are now in the Louvre and the Guimet museum. Alfred travelled to India, reaching it in 1863. He had intended to explore the high plateau of Tibet, but was prevented by a severe attack of fever.

Grandidier travelled to Zanzibar to recuperate, remaining some time and making important collections and publishing an account of his findings. He then visited the island of Réunion and in 1865 made his first visit to Madagascar. He became devoted to the study of the island, revisiting in 1866 and 1868. He finally returned permanently to France in 1870. During his explorations he crossed the island three times, travelling 3,000 kilometers in the interior and 2,500 along the coast. He made observations which resulted in the production of a map of the island used in future expeditions.

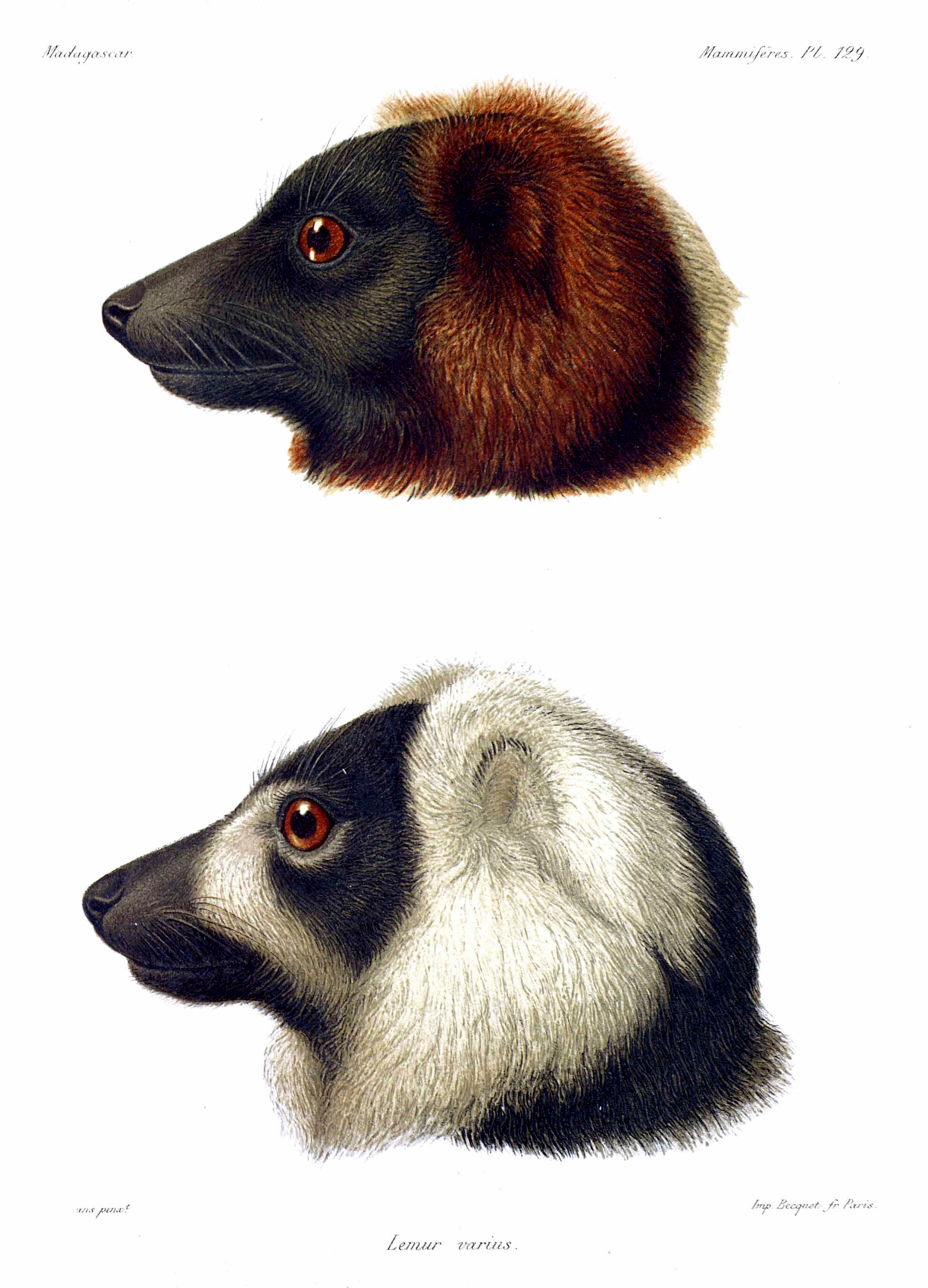
Ruffed lemur

After returning to France he began to work on his great work, L'Histoire physique, naturelle et politique de Madagascar. This work was undertaken in cooperation with others such as Alphonse Milne-Edwards and Leon Vaillant. This work ran to 40 volumes, the final volumes published posthumously by his son Guillaume Grandidier. He described about 50 new species of reptiles and amphibians.

Alfred Grandidier's work drew the attention of the French government to Madagascar, which it would annex at the end of 1890.

He was elected to the French Academy of Sciences in 1885 and was the president of the French Geographical Society from 1901 to 1905. The Royal Geographical Society awarded him their Founder's Medal in 1906.

== Honours ==
Oplurus grandidieri, a species of lizard, and Xenotyphlops grandidieri, a species of snake, were named in his honour by French herpetologist François Mocquard. The mineral grandidierite, discovered in Madagascar, was also named in his honour, as is the giant Grandidier baobab. Also, Grandidiera boivinii a flowering shrub from Africa was named after him in 1866 by French botanist Hippolyte François Jaubert. The plant genus Didierea is also named after him.

== Works ==
Partial list.

- Grandidier A (1867). "Description de quatre espèces nouvelles de Lepidopteres decouvertes sur la cote sud-oust de Madagascar ". Revue et Magasin de Zoologie Pure et Appliquee 19: 272–275.
- Grandidier A (1887). Histoire physique, naturelle et politique de Madagascar. Volumes 18 & 19. Paris: Imprimerie Nationale.
- Grandidier A (1885–1887). "Histoire naturelle des lepidopteres ". Histoire Physique, Naturelle et Politique de Madagascar 18 [1887]: i-v, 1–364; 19 [1885].

== See also ==
- Category:Taxa named by Alfred Grandidier
