= Ambesisika =

- Location in Madagascar
- Coordinates: 16°31′S 46°52′E
- Country: Madagascar
- Region: Boeny
- District: Ambato-Boeni
- Established: 2015
- Elevation: 98 m (322 ft)

Population
  - Total: 15,000
- Time zone: UTC3 (EAT)
- Postal code: 403

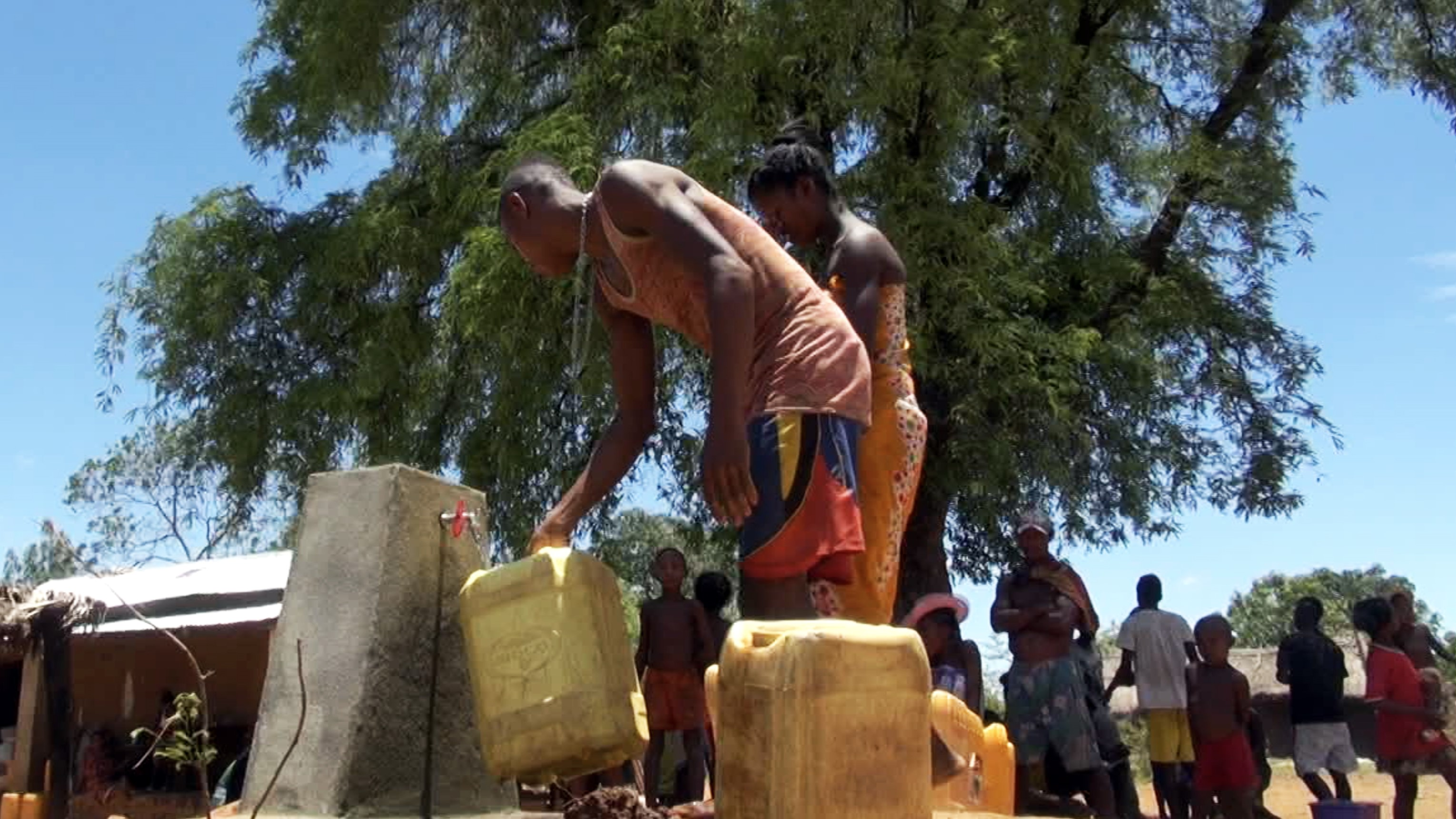
A water project of Objectif 2030 in Ambesisika

Ambesisika is a rural municipality in Madagascar. It belongs to the district of Ambato-Boeni, which is a part of Boeny Region. The population of the municipality was 15.000.

This municipality formerly belonged to Ambato Ambarimay, from which it had been split off in 2015.
