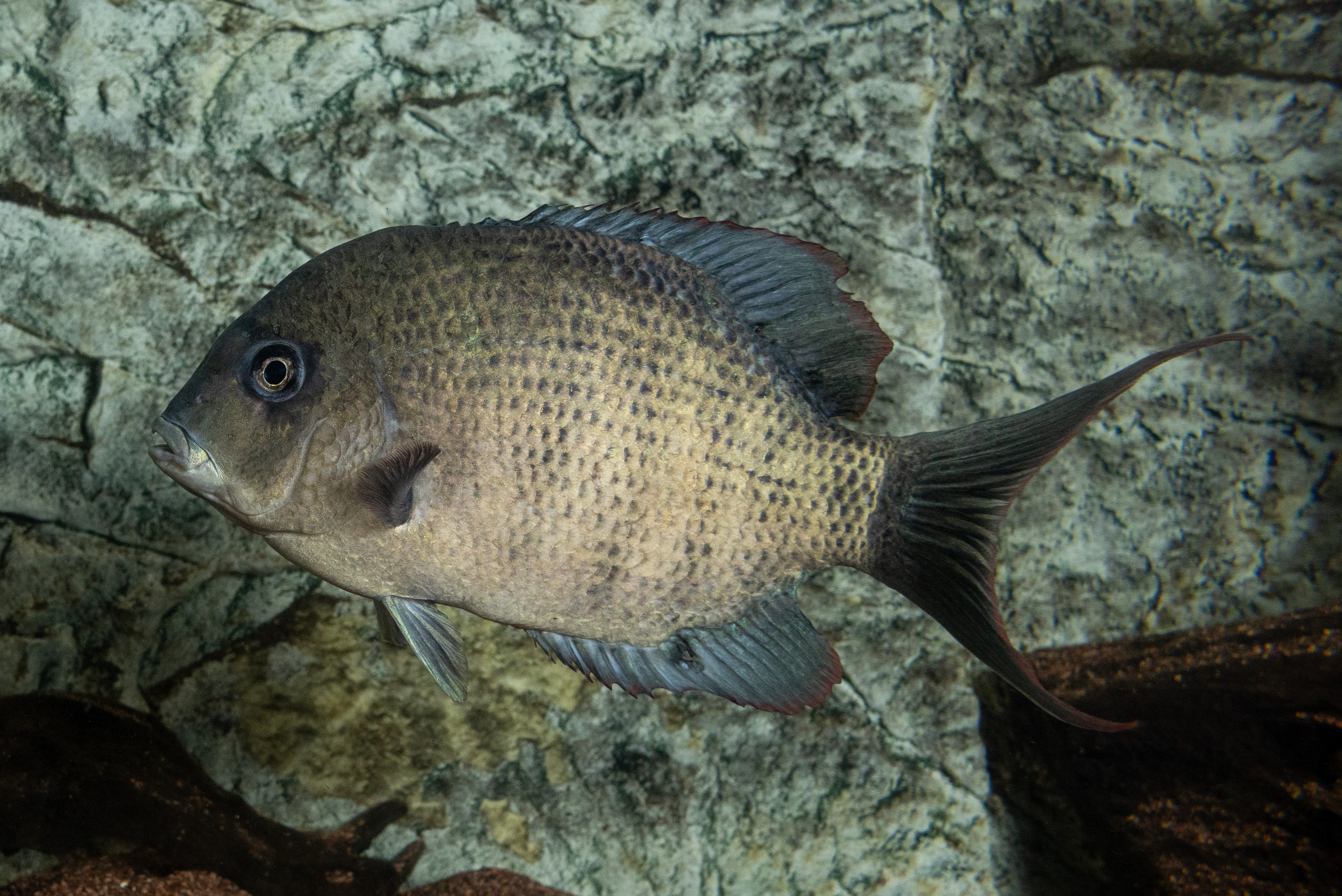

Conservation status
- Critically Endangered (IUCN 3.1)

Scientific classification
- Kingdom: Animalia
- Phylum: Chordata
- Class: Actinopterygii
- Order: Cichliformes
- Family: Cichlidae
- Genus: Paretroplus
- Species: P. menarambo

Binomial name
- Paretroplus menarambo Allgayer, 1966

= Paretroplus menarambo =

Species of fish

Paretroplus menarambo (pinstripe menarambo or pinstripe damba) is a species of cichlid fish.

It is threatened by invasive species and over-fishing. It is part of a captive breeding program by public institutions like London Zoo and Bolton Museum and among fishkeeping hobbyists.

== Description ==
The pinstripe menarambo is a relatively deep-bodied Paretroplus that reaches 12.8–25 centimetres (5.0–9.8 in) in length. Body is very laterally compressed. The coloration is brown-gray with vertical darker bands. The fins are gray with reddish-brown border. The tail fin is crescent-shaped.

== Distribution ==
This species is present in the floodplain lakes in the Sofia River system in northwestern Madagascar. It was formerly classified as extinct in the wild by the IUCN, but a remnant population has recently been discovered in Lake Tseny. The same lake also has populations of the related P. kieneri and P. lamenabe, and the round herring Sauvagella robusta.

== Bibliography ==
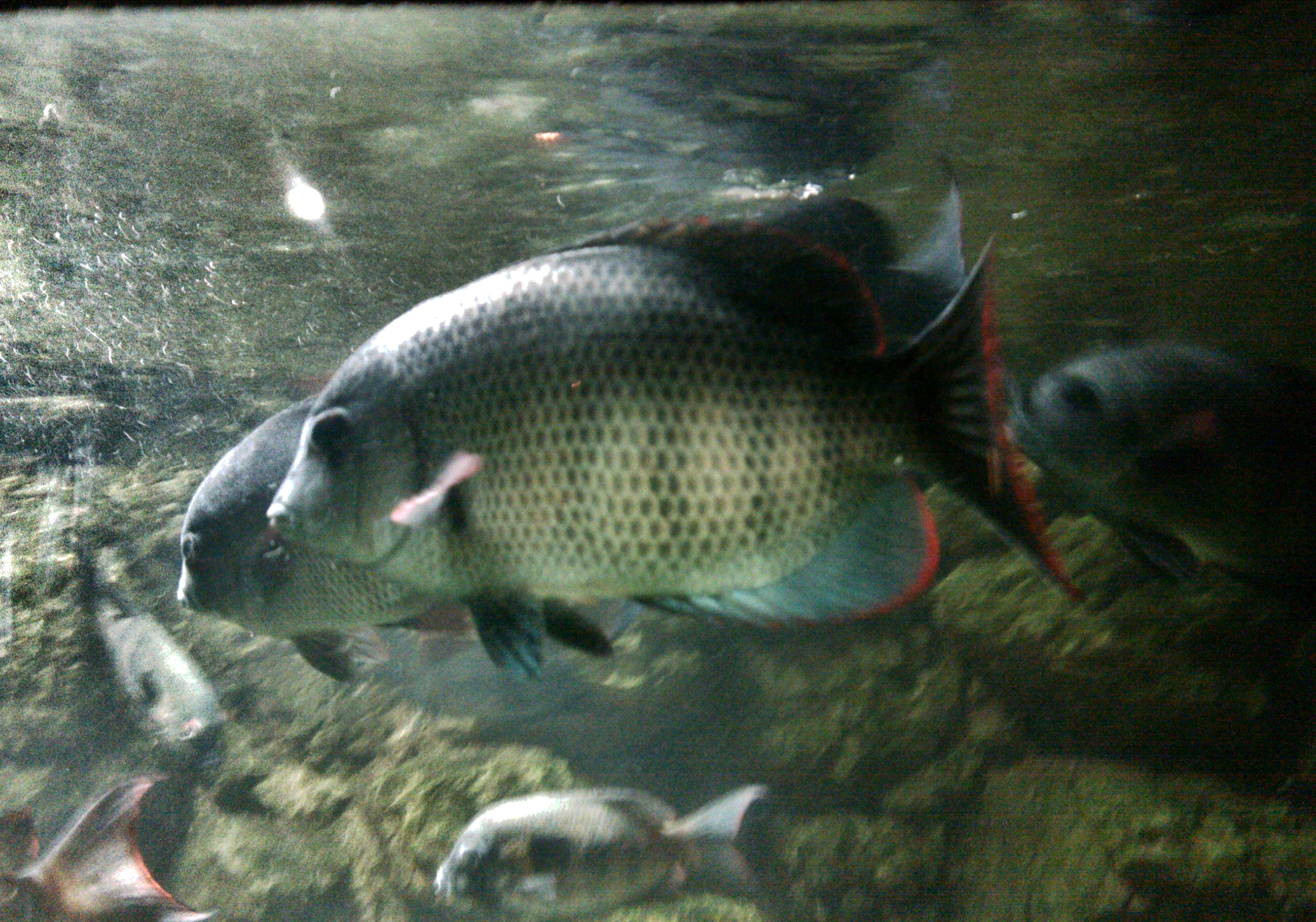
Paretroplus menarambo

- Andriafidison D et al., Preliminary fish survey of Lac Tseny in northwestern Madagascar in Madagascar Conservation & Development, vol. 6, nº 2, 2011, p. 83
- Axelrod, H. R., 1993. The most complete colored lexicon of cichlids. T.F.H. Publications, Neptune City USA.
- Goldstein, R.J.: Cichlids of the world.T.F.H. Publications Inc. Neptune City, New Jersey, USA. Any 1988.
- Helfman, G., B. Collette i D. Facey: The diversity of fishes. Blackwell Science, Malden, Massachusetts USA, 1997.
- Moyle, P. i J. Cech.: Fishes: An Introduction to Ichthyology, 4a. edició, Upper Saddle River, New Jersey, USA: Prentice-Hall. Any 2000.
- Nelson, J.: Fishes of the World, 3a. ed. New York, USA: John Wiley and Sons. Any 1994.
- Poll, M. & J.P. Gosse 1995: Genera des poissons d'eau douce de l'Afrique. Mémoire de la Classe des Sciences. Académie royale de Belgique. 9: 1–324.
- Römer U.: Cichliden Atlas, Bd. 1. Melle. 1311 p. Any 1998.
- Sparks, J. 2008. Phylogeny of the cichlid subfamily Etroplinae and taxonomic revision of the malagasy cichlid genus Paretroplus (Teleostei: Cichlidae). Bulletin of the American museum of Natural history, 314: 1–151.
- Wheeler, A.: The World Encyclopedia of Fishes, 2nd. Ed., London: Macdonald. Any 1985.
