= Ankijabe =

- Location in Madagascar
- Coordinates: 16°22′S 46°37′E
- Country: Madagascar
- Region: Boeny
- District: Ambato-Boeni
- Elevation: 114 m (374 ft)

Population (2001)
  - Total: 19,000
- Time zone: UTC3 (EAT)
- Postal code: 403

Ankijabe is a rural municipality in Madagascar. It belongs to the district of Ambato-Boeni, which is a part of Boeny Region. The population of the commune was estimated to be approximately 19,000 in 2001.

Only primary schooling is available. The majority 55% of the population of the commune are farmers, while an additional 32% receives their livelihood from raising livestock. The most important crop is rice, while other important products are peanuts, maize and sweet potatoes. Services provide employment for 3% of the population. Additionally fishing employs 10% of the population.

== Roads ==
Ankijabe is situated on the National road 33b between Andranofasika (RN4) and Ambato Ambarimay.
