= Tsaramandroso (disambiguation) =

Tsaramandroso may refer to:

- Tsaramandroso, Rural municipality in Madagascar
- Tsaramandroso, Neighbourhood of Antsiranana city
