= Madirovalo =

- Location in Madagascar
- Coordinates: 16°26′S 46°32′E
- Country: Madagascar
- Region: Boeny
- District: Ambato-Boeni
- Elevation: 12 m (39 ft)

Population (2001)
  - Total: 66,000
- Time zone: UTC3 (EAT)
- Postal code: 403

Madirovalo is a rural municipality in Madagascar. It belongs to the district of Ambato-Boeni, which is a part of Boeny Region. The population of the commune was estimated to be approximately 66,000 in 2001.

Madirovalo has a riverine harbour on the Betsiboka River.

Primary and junior level secondary education are available in town. The town provides access to hospital services to its citizens.

The majority 85% of the population of the commune are farmers, while an additional 8% receives their livelihood from raising livestock. The most important crop is rice, while other important products are peanuts, maize and sweet potatoes. Services provide employment for 2% of the population. Additionally fishing employs 5% of the population.
