= Ambato-Boeni District =

Ambato-Boeni
- District
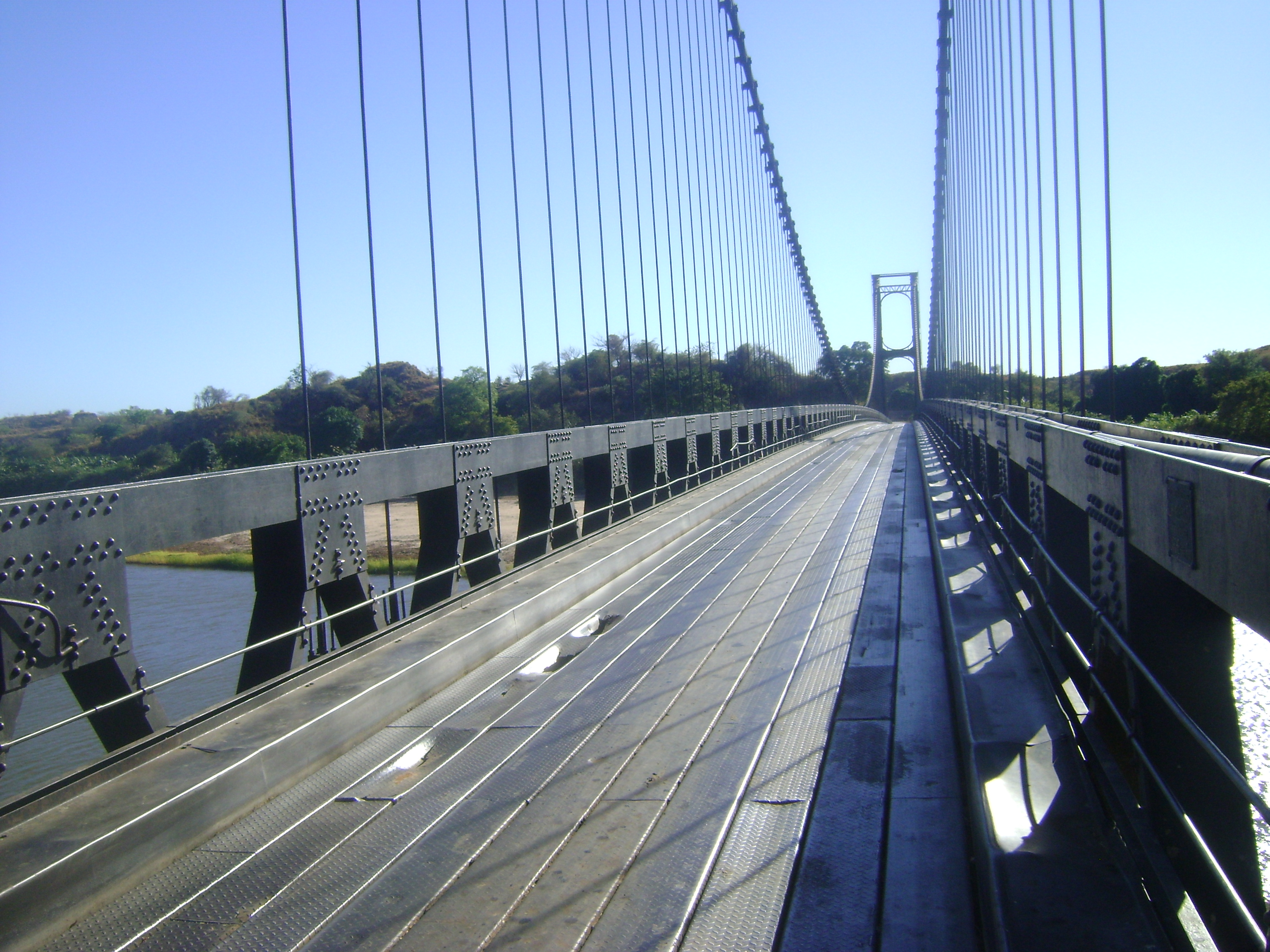
- Country: Madagascar
- Region: Boeny

Population (2018)
  - Total: 264,170
- Postal code: 403

Ambato-Boeni is a district of Boeny in Madagascar.

== Communes ==
The district is further divided into 11 communes:

- Ambato Ambarimay
- Ambondromamy
- Andranofasika
- Andranomamy
- Anjiajia
- Ankijabe
- Ankirihitra
- Madirovalo
- Manerinerina
- Sitampiky
- Tsaramandroso

== Roads ==
The district is crossed by the National road 33b from Andranofasika to Ambato Ambarimay.

== Rivers ==
- The Betsiboka River.

== Protected area ==
- Part of Ankarafantsika national park.
