= Ptychochromis mainty =

Conservation status
- Data Deficient (IUCN 3.1)

Scientific classification
- Domain: Eukaryota
- Kingdom: Animalia
- Phylum: Chordata
- Class: Actinopterygii
- Order: Cichliformes
- Family: Cichlidae
- Genus: Ptychochromis
- Species: P. mainty

Binomial name
- Ptychochromis mainty Martinez, Arroyave & Sparks, 2015

Species of fish

Ptychochromis mainty is a species of cichlid from the subfamily Ptychochrominae, a subfamily which is endemic to the freshwaters of Madagascar. It has only been recorded from forested streams in the vicinity of Fort Dauphin in the south eastern part of the island. Its closest relative is Ptychochromis grandidieri.

== Etymology ==
The species name comes from the Malagasy word for the color black, referring to its uniform dark pigmentation pattern in a specimen preserved in alcohol and the large black midlateral blotch in a live specimen.
