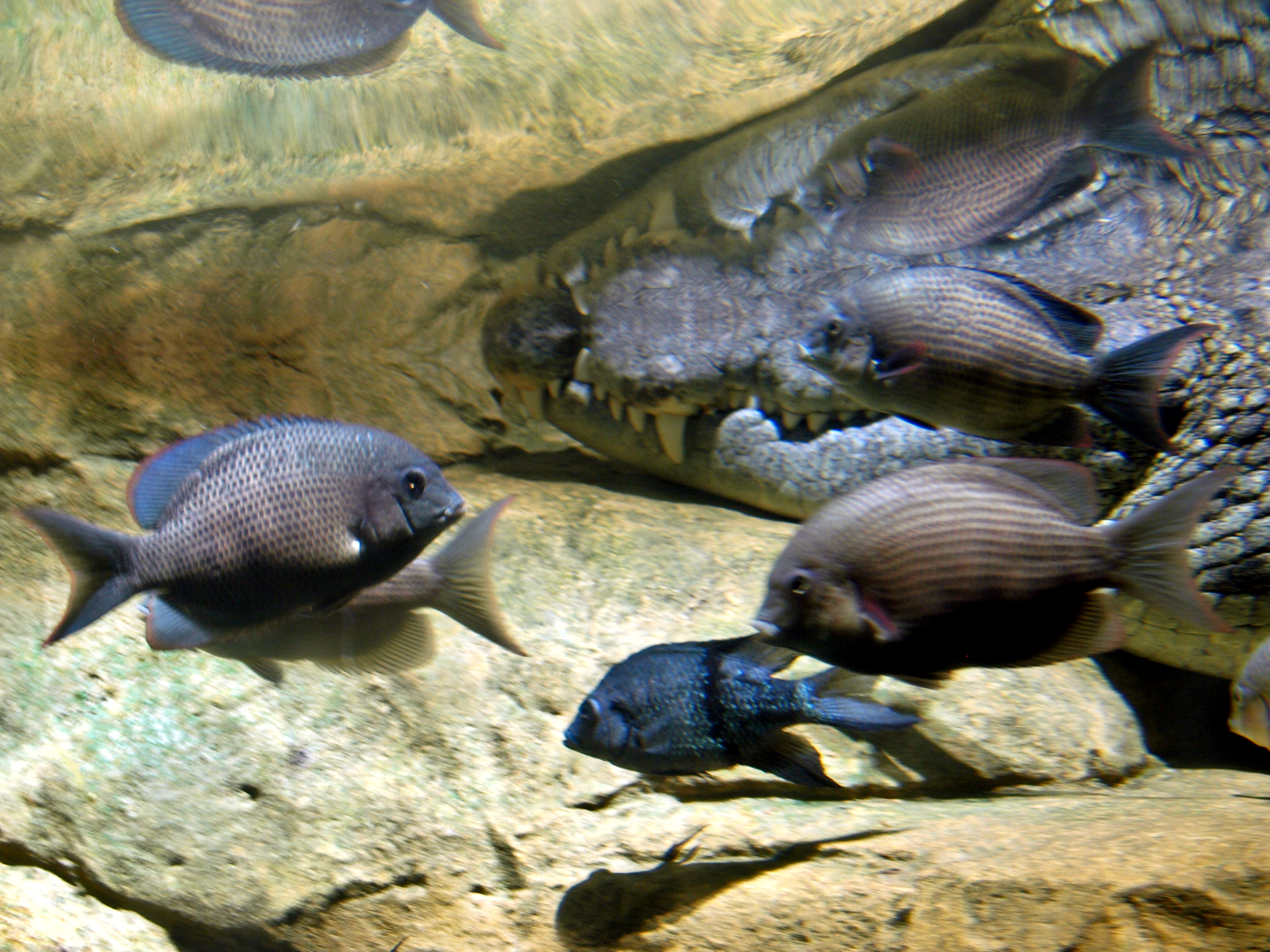
- A single Ptychochromis oligacanthus (lowermost fish with a dark bar on its body) and four Paretroplus menarambo

Conservation status
- Endangered (IUCN 3.1)

Scientific classification
- Kingdom: Animalia
- Phylum: Chordata
- Class: Actinopterygii
- Order: Cichliformes
- Family: Cichlidae
- Genus: Ptychochromis
- Species: P. oligacanthus

Binomial name
- Ptychochromis oligacanthus (Bleeker, 1868)

Synonyms
- Tilapia oligacanthus Bleeker, 1868

= Ptychochromis oligacanthus =

Species of fish

Ptychochromis oligacanthus is a species of cichlid endemic in fresh water habitats in the western part of the Antsiranana Province in Madagascar. The population on the island of Nosy Be appears to be stable, but the mainland populations are threatened by habitat loss. It reaches a length of 25 centimetres (9.8 in) TL.
