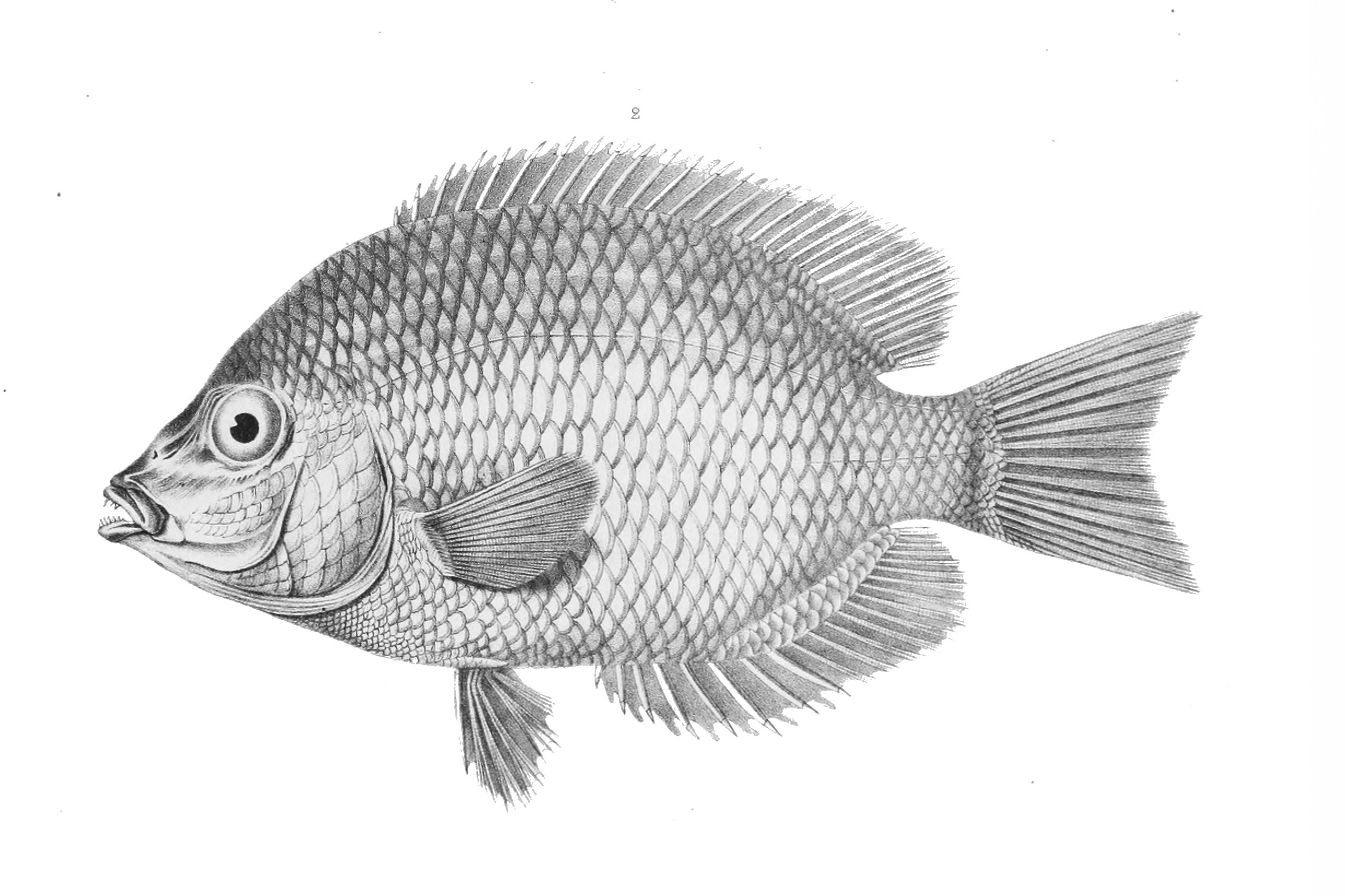

Conservation status
- Least Concern (IUCN 3.1)

Scientific classification
- Kingdom: Animalia
- Phylum: Chordata
- Class: Actinopterygii
- Order: Cichliformes
- Family: Cichlidae
- Genus: Paretroplus
- Species: P. polyactis

Binomial name
- Paretroplus polyactis (Bleeker, 1878)

Synonyms
- Chromis madagascariensis Guichenot, 1866

= Paretroplus polyactis =

Species of fish

Paretroplus polyactis is a vulnerable species of cichlid found widely in fresh and brackish water in coastal regions and associated river basins in eastern Madagascar. It is the only Paretroplus found in the southern half of Madagascar, and one of only two found in eastern drainages (the other is the far more restricted P. loisellei). P. polyactis is threatened by habitat loss and overfishing. This relatively deep-bodied Paretroplus reaches 30 centimetres (12 in) in length. It shares a large part of its range with a cichlid from another genus, Ptychochromis grandidieri.
