= Ankirihitra =

- Location in Madagascar
- Coordinates: 16°46′S 46°27′E
- Country: Madagascar
- Region: Boeny
- District: Ambato-Boeni
- Elevation: 84 m (276 ft)

Population (2001)
  - Total: 9,000
- Time zone: UTC3 (EAT)

Ankirihitra is a town and commune (Malagasy: kaominina) in Madagascar. It belongs to the district of Ambato-Boeni, which is a part of Boeny Region. The population of the commune was estimated to be approximately 9,000 in a 2001 commune census.

Only primary schooling is available. The majority, an estimated 99%, of the population consists of farmers. The most important crop is rice, while other important products are maize and cassava. Additionally, fishing employs 1% of the population.
