= Paretroplus dambabe =

Conservation status
- Critically Endangered (IUCN 3.1)

Scientific classification
- Kingdom: Animalia
- Phylum: Chordata
- Class: Actinopterygii
- Order: Cichliformes
- Family: Cichlidae
- Genus: Paretroplus
- Species: P. dambabe

Binomial name
- Paretroplus dambabe Sparks, 2002

Species of fish

Paretroplus dambabe is an endangered species of cichlid from the Mahavavy du Sud river basin, including Lake Kinkony, in northwestern Madagascar. It has declined drastically due to habitat loss, invasive species and over-fishing. This relatively large and deep-bodied Paretroplus reaches almost 19 centimetres (7.5 in) in length. Although collected as early as the 1960s, it was long confused with P. petiti and therefore only described as a species in 2002.

== In the aquarium ==
This tends to be an aggressive cichlid, especially during mating. It is important that at least 6 individuals are kept. Otherwise, the risk of having one fish being picked on and killed will increase. They are very easily susceptible to disease Ich.
