= Kotso =

Conservation status
- Data Deficient (IUCN 3.1)

Scientific classification
- Kingdom: Animalia
- Phylum: Chordata
- Class: Actinopterygii
- Order: Cichliformes
- Family: Cichlidae
- Genus: Paretroplus
- Species: P. petiti

Binomial name
- Paretroplus petiti Pellegrin, 1929

Species of fish

The kotso (Paretroplus petiti) is a species of cichlid fish from northwestern Madagascar. Currently rated as data deficient by the IUCN, this species is virtually unknown. The only known specimen is a juvenile that was collected more than 80 years ago. It is not entirely clear where it was collected, but likely from the Maintimaso River or Lake Ambanja, which both are part of the Betsiboka River drainage. Erroneously, the name P. petiti has often been applied to members of a different species, P. dambabe. The specific name honours the French zoologist and anatomist Georges Petit (1892-1973) of the Muséum national d'Histoire naturelle, who collected type.
