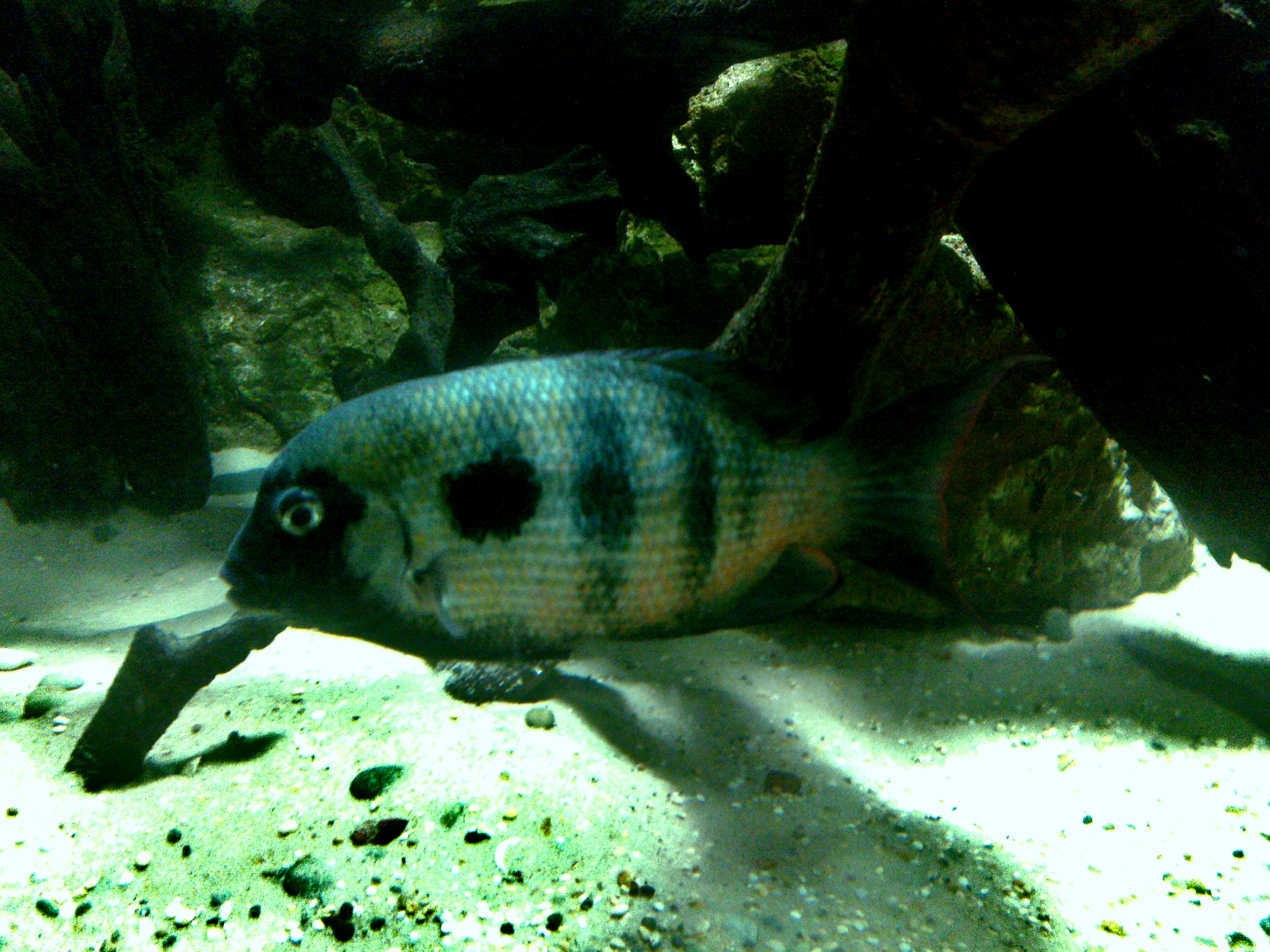
- At London Zoo

Conservation status
- Critically Endangered (IUCN 3.1)

Scientific classification
- Kingdom: Animalia
- Phylum: Chordata
- Class: Actinopterygii
- Order: Cichliformes
- Family: Cichlidae
- Genus: Paretroplus
- Species: P. maculatus

Binomial name
- Paretroplus maculatus Kiener & Maugé, 1966

= Damba mipentina =

Species of fish

The damba mipentina (Paretroplus maculatus) is a critically endangered species of cichlid fish from turbid, shallow flood-plain lakes in the Betsiboka and Ikopa River basins in northwestern Madagascar. It has declined drastically because of habitat loss, overfishing and invasive species. It is part of a captive breeding program by public institutions like London Zoo and among fishkeeping hobbyists.

This relatively deep-bodied Paretroplus can easily be distinguished from other members of the genus by the large black spot on the side of the body. It reaches 30 centimetres (12 in) in length.
