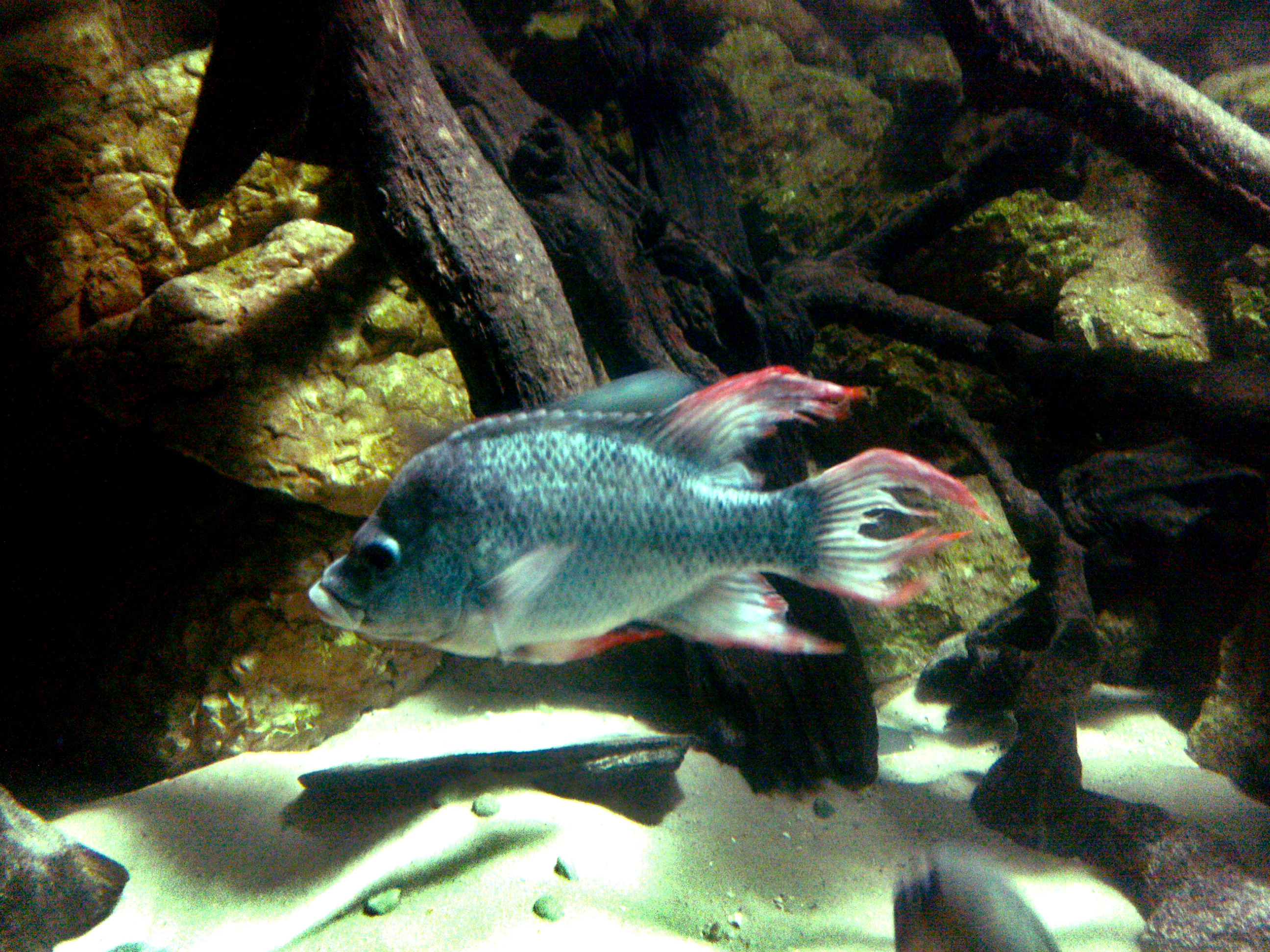
- Ptychochromis insolitus

Scientific classification
- Kingdom: Animalia
- Phylum: Chordata
- Class: Actinopterygii
- Order: Cichliformes
- Family: Cichlidae
- Subfamily: Ptychochrominae
- Genus: Ptychochromis; Steindachner, 1880

Type species
- Tilapia oligacanthus Bleeker, 1868

= Ptychochromis =

Genus of fishes

Ptychochromis is a genus of cichlids endemic to rivers and lakes in Madagascar. One species (P. grandidieri) can also be seen in brackish water. Most species in this genus are threatened, and P. onilahy is probably extinct. Most reach a length of 15 to 20 cm (6 to 8 in), but P. insolitus reaches 25 cm (10 in), while P. grandidieri and P. oligacanthus reach 35 cm (14 in) and 20 cm (8 in) respectively. The largest species was P. onilahy which may have reached as much as 45 cm (18 in) if reports of fishermen are to be believed.

== Species ==
There are currently 10 recognized species in this genus:

- Ptychochromis curvidens Stiassny & Sparks, 2006
- Ptychochromis ernestmagnusi Sparks & Stiassny, 2010
- Ptychochromis grandidieri Sauvage, 1882
- Ptychochromis inornatus Sparks, 2002
- Ptychochromis insolitus Stiassny & Sparks, 2006
- Ptychochromis loisellei Stiassny & Sparks, 2006
- Ptychochromis makira Stiassny & Sparks, 2006
- Ptychochromis mainty C. M. Martinez, Arroyave-Gutiérrez & Sparks, 2015
- Ptychochromis oligacanthus (Bleeker, 1868)
- † Ptychochromis onilahy Stiassny & Sparks, 2006

Additionally, cichlid from the eastern Anosy Region in far southeastern Madagascar may actually represent an undescribed species, popularly known as Ptychochromis sp. "Manampanihy".
