= Ptychochromis inornatus =

Conservation status
- Endangered (IUCN 3.1)

Scientific classification
- Kingdom: Animalia
- Phylum: Chordata
- Class: Actinopterygii
- Order: Cichliformes
- Family: Cichlidae
- Genus: Ptychochromis
- Species: P. inornatus

Binomial name
- Ptychochromis inornatus Sparks, 2002

Species of fish

Ptychochromis inornatus is an endangered species of cichlid endemic to the Ankofia River basin and its tributaries in the eastern part of the Mahajanga Province in Madagascar. It is threatened by habitat loss. It reaches 12.2 cm (4.8 in) in standard length.
