= Paretroplus maromandia =

Conservation status
- Endangered (IUCN 3.1)

Scientific classification
- Kingdom: Animalia
- Phylum: Chordata
- Class: Actinopterygii
- Order: Cichliformes
- Family: Cichlidae
- Genus: Paretroplus
- Species: P. maromandia

Binomial name
- Paretroplus maromandia Sparks & Reinthal, 1999

Species of cichlid fish from Madagascar

Paretroplus maromandia is an endangered species of cichlid fish from fresh and brackish water in northwestern Madagascar, where known from the Maintsomalaza, Andranomalaza and Maevarano Rivers, and Lake Andrapongy. It has already been extirpated from the lake, and is threatened by habitat loss and invasive species. This relatively deep-bodied Paretroplus reaches 25 centimetres (9.8 in) in length.
