= Sitampiky =

- Location in Madagascar
- Coordinates: 16°40′S 46°6′E
- Country: Madagascar
- Region: Boeny
- District: Ambato-Boeni
- Elevation: 115 m (377 ft)

Population (2001)
  - Total: 21,000
- Time zone: UTC3 (EAT)

Sitampiky is a rural municipality in north-western Madagascar approximately 240 kilometres north-west of the capital Antananarivo. It belongs to the district of Ambato-Boeni, which is a part of Boeny Region. The population of the commune was estimated to be approximately 21,000 in 2001 commune census.

Primary and junior level secondary education are available in town. The majority (77%) of the population of the commune are farmers, while an additional 15% receives their livelihood from raising livestock. The most important crop is raffia palm, while other important products are maize and rice. Services provide employment for 3% of the population. Additionally fishing employs 5% of the population.

== Rivers ==
Sitampiky is situated at the Mahavavy Sud River.
