= Ptychochromis makira =

Conservation status
- Data Deficient (IUCN 3.1)

Scientific classification
- Kingdom: Animalia
- Phylum: Chordata
- Class: Actinopterygii
- Order: Cichliformes
- Family: Cichlidae
- Genus: Ptychochromis
- Species: P. makira

Binomial name
- Ptychochromis makira Stiassny & Sparks, 2006

Species of fish

Ptychochromis makira is a species of cichlid only known from the Antainambalana River in the northernmost part of the Toamasina Province in Madagascar. It is threatened by habitat loss and overfishing, and has suffered a severe decline in recent years. It reaches a length of 14.6 centimetres (5.7 in) SL.
