= Ambato Ambarimay =

- Location in Madagascar
- Coordinates: 16°47′S 46°32′E
- Country: Madagascar
- Region: Boeny
- District: Ambato-Boeni

Area
  - Total: 596.60 km^{2} (230.35 sq mi)
- Elevation: 60 m (200 ft)

Population (2001)
  - Total: 35,000
- Time zone: UTC3 (EAT)
- Postal code: 403

Ambato Ambarimay (also called: Ambato Boeny) is a rural municipality in Madagascar. It belongs to the district of Ambato-Boeni, which is a part of Boeny Region. The population of the commune was estimated to be approximately 35,000 in 2001 commune census.

In addition to primary schooling the town offers secondary education at both junior and senior levels. The town has a permanent court and hospital. The majority 65% of the population of the commune are farmers, while an additional 10% receives their livelihood from raising livestock. The most important crop is peanuts, while other important products are cotton, rice and cowpeas. Services provide employment for 10% of the population. Additionally fishing employs 15% of the population.

== Roads ==
Ambato Ambarimay is located at the end of the National road 33b from Andranofasika, in a distance of 143 km from Mahajanga.

== River ==
It is situated at the Betsiboka River.
