= Ankarafantsika National Park =

National park in Madagascar

Coordinates: 16.15°S 46.95°E

- IUCN category II (national park)
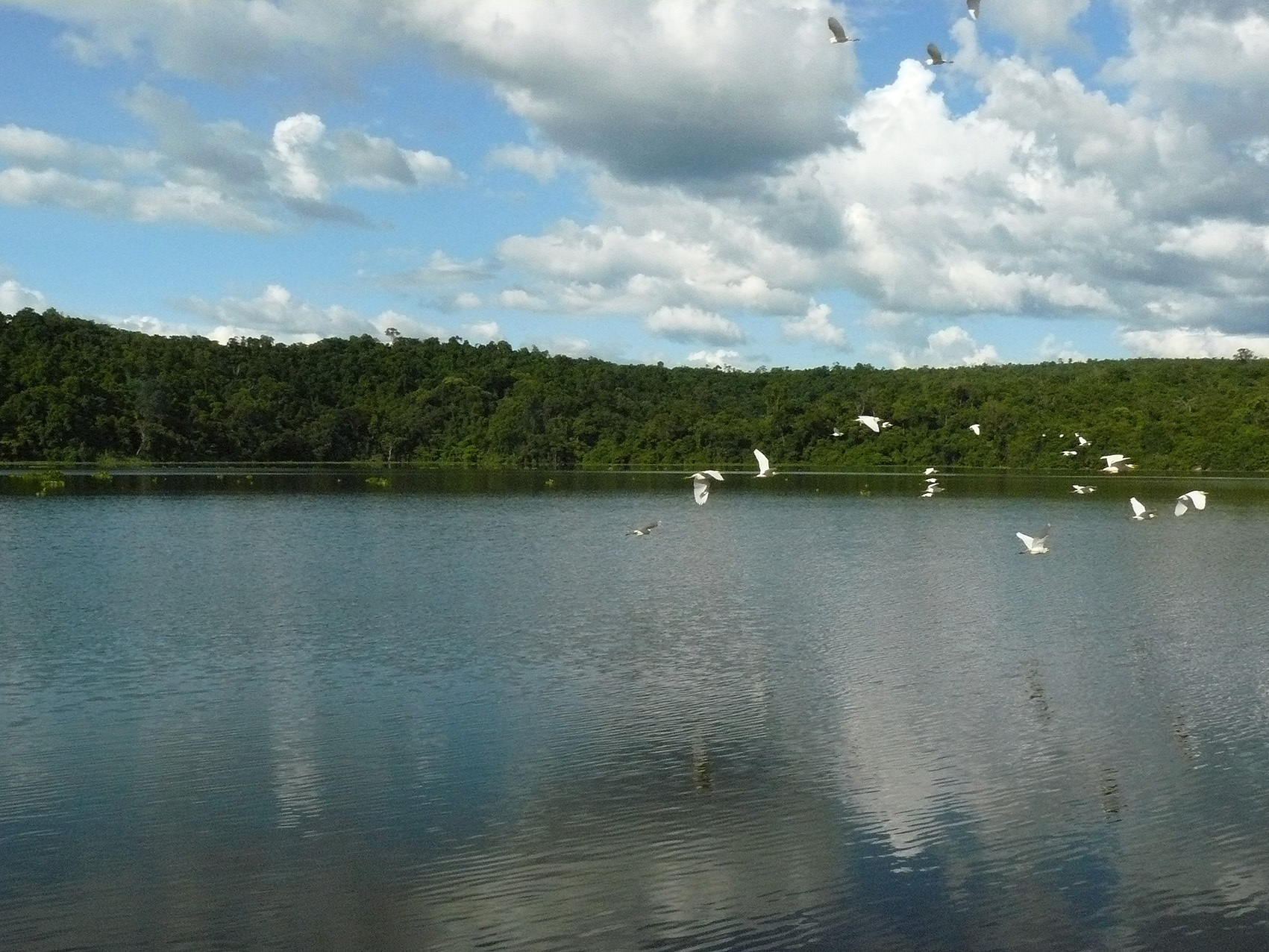
- Lake Ravelobe
- Location: Boeny Region, Madagascar
- Nearest city: Andranofasika; Majunga
- Area: 1,365.13 km^{2} (527.08 sq mi)
- Established: 31 December 1927 (as nature reserve); 2002 (as national park)
- Governing body: Madagascar National Parks

Ramsar Wetland
- Official name: Zones Humides Ankarafantsika (CLSA)
- Designated: 2 February 2017
- Reference no.: 2289

Ankarafantsika National Park is a national park near Andranofasika in the Boeny Region of Madagascar. The closest city is Majunga 115 kilometres (71 mi) north of the park. Ankarafantsika is mostly tropical in climate type. The Sakalava people are the predominant ethnic group living and farming here. The greater big-footed mouse (Macrotarsomys ingens) lives in the park and is not known anywhere else.

== The park ==
The park is between the Betsiboka River to the west and the Mahajamba River to the east. Originally there were two parks on either side of Route 4 national road, but they were combined in 2002. The park occupies about 135,000 hectares and consists of patches of thick dry tropical forest interspersed with less dense areas. There are also savannah, scrub and sandy eroded rock areas and some land is farmed by the indigenous Sakalava people. There are a number of lakes and the park is criss-crossed by tracks and paths. There are lodging facilities and guides are available to help visitors appreciate the wildlife and scenery.

== Flora and fauna ==
Ankarafantsika National Park is mostly woodland, and the tree species are typical of dry tropical forest. Over 800 species are present, many of them endemic to Madagascar. Notable examples include the flowering bush mpanjakabenitany (Baudouinia fluggeiformis), the katrafay (Cedrelopsis grevei) used in traditional medicine, the small tree lohavato (Hymenodictyon occidental) and sakoanala (Poupartia silvatica), a large tree with conspicuous flowers.

The native fauna of Madagascar are well represented. Ten species of amphibian and 44 reptile species are present. These include the rare Madagascan big-headed turtle (Erymnochelys madagascariensis), the rhinoceros chameleon (Furcifer rhinoceratus) and the dwarf chameleon (Brookesia decaryi). There are two ground-dwelling boa constrictor snakes Acrantophis madagascariensis and Sanzinia madagascariensis, and the rare terrestrial snake Liophidium therezieni.

Mammals include eight species of lemur, two of which are mouse lemurs (Microcebus spp.), the world's smallest primates. The greater big-footed mouse (Macrotarsomys ingens) is a recently described small rodent known only in the park and its vicinity.

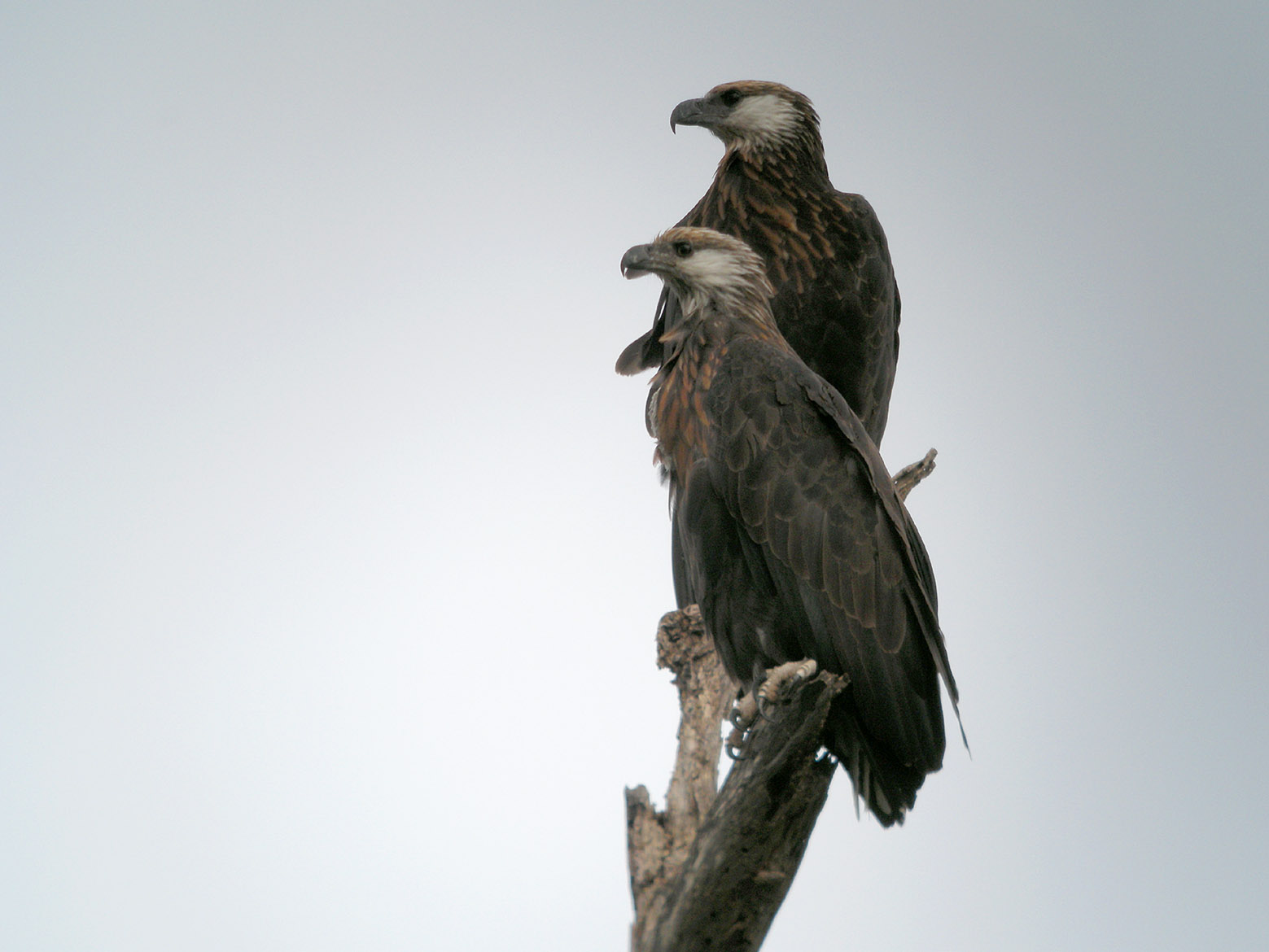
Madagascar fish eagles

One hundred and twenty nine species of birds have been recorded in the park, more than half of them endemic to Madagascar. They include the Van Dam's vanga (Xenopirostris damii), the rufous vanga (Schetba rufa), the elusive banded kestrel (Falco zoniventris) and the more easily observed Madagascar fish eagle (Haliaeetus vociferoides) which can often be seen at Ravelobe Lake. The endangered Madagascar heron (Ardea humbloti) can be seen at Lake Ravelobe.
