= Ptychochromis onilahy =

Conservation status
- Extinct (IUCN 3.1)

Scientific classification
- Kingdom: Animalia
- Phylum: Chordata
- Class: Actinopterygii
- Order: Cichliformes
- Family: Cichlidae
- Genus: Ptychochromis
- Species: †P. onilahy

Binomial name
- †Ptychochromis onilahy Stiassny & Sparks, 2006

Species of fish

Ptychochromis onilahy was a species of cichlid endemic to the Onilahy River in southwestern Madagascar. Despite several recent visits to the region, this species has not been recorded since 1962 when the only known five specimens were collected. It is listed as extinct by the IUCN (their initial rating was made before its official description, and therefore listed under the temporary name Ptychochromis sp. nov. 'Kotro'), but the Onilahy River system is large, and there is a small chance remnant populations exist in remote regions. This species can reach a length of 8.6 centimetres (3.4 in) SL.
