= Ptychochromis loisellei =

Conservation status
- Endangered (IUCN 3.1)

Scientific classification
- Kingdom: Animalia
- Phylum: Chordata
- Class: Actinopterygii
- Order: Cichliformes
- Family: Cichlidae
- Genus: Ptychochromis
- Species: P. loisellei

Binomial name
- Ptychochromis loisellei Stiassny & Sparks, 2006

Species of fish

Ptychochromis loisellei, also known as the blotched Madagascar cichlid, is a species of cichlid from the Mahanara River basin north of Sambava in northeastern Madagascar. It remains common within its small range, but it is threatened by habitat loss and introduced species. It reaches about 11.9 centimetres (4.7 in). The similar named Paretroplus loisellei is also restricted to the Mahanara River basin. The specific name honours Paul V. Loiselle, emeritus Curator of Freshwater Fishes at the New York Aquarium and a researcher in, and campaigner for the conservation of, the freshwater fish of Madagascar.
