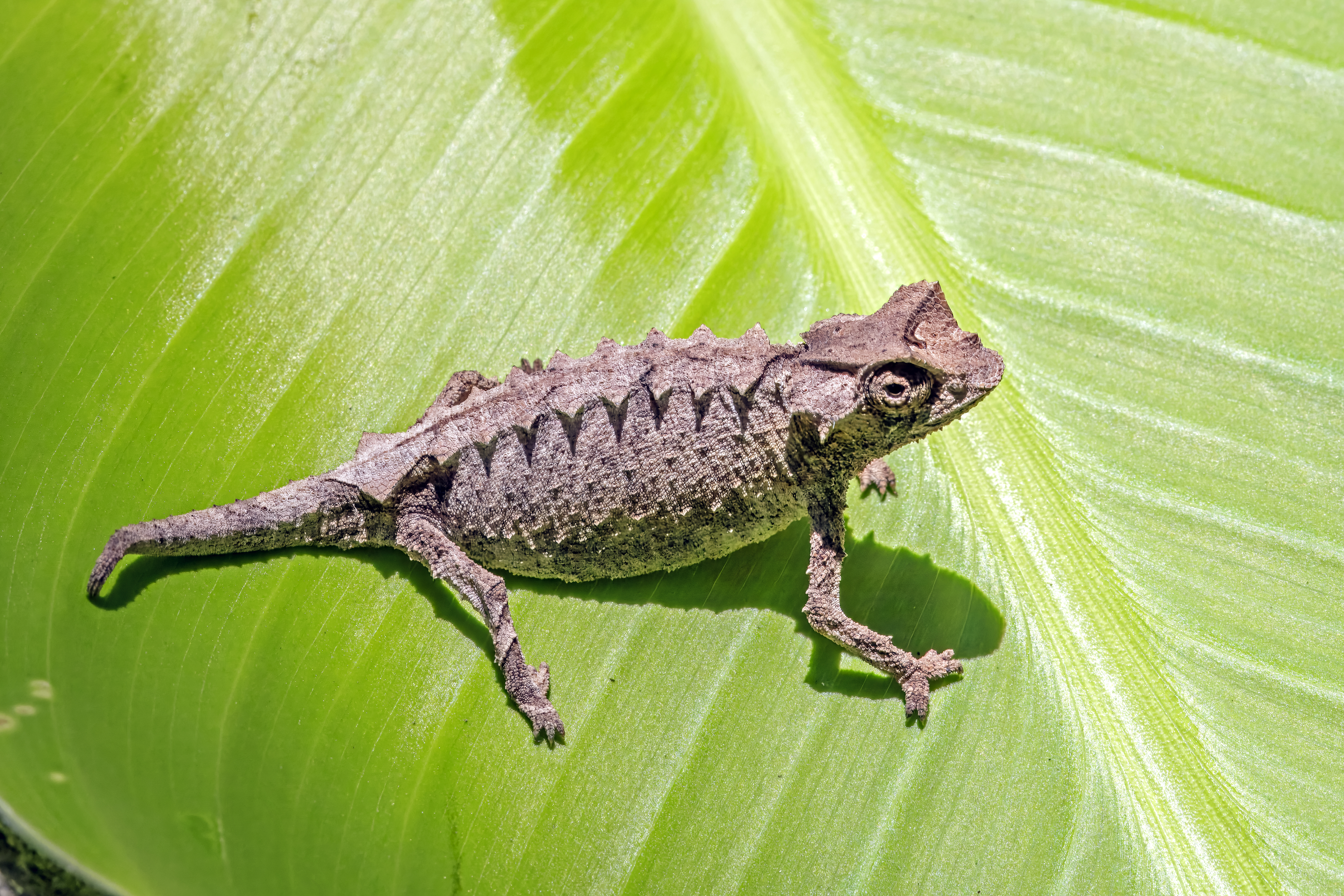
- in Ranomafana National Park

Conservation status
- Endangered (IUCN 3.1)

Scientific classification
- Kingdom: Animalia
- Phylum: Chordata
- Class: Reptilia
- Order: Squamata
- Suborder: Iguania
- Family: Chamaeleonidae
- Genus: Brookesia
- Species: B. decaryi

Binomial name
- Brookesia decaryi Angel, 1939
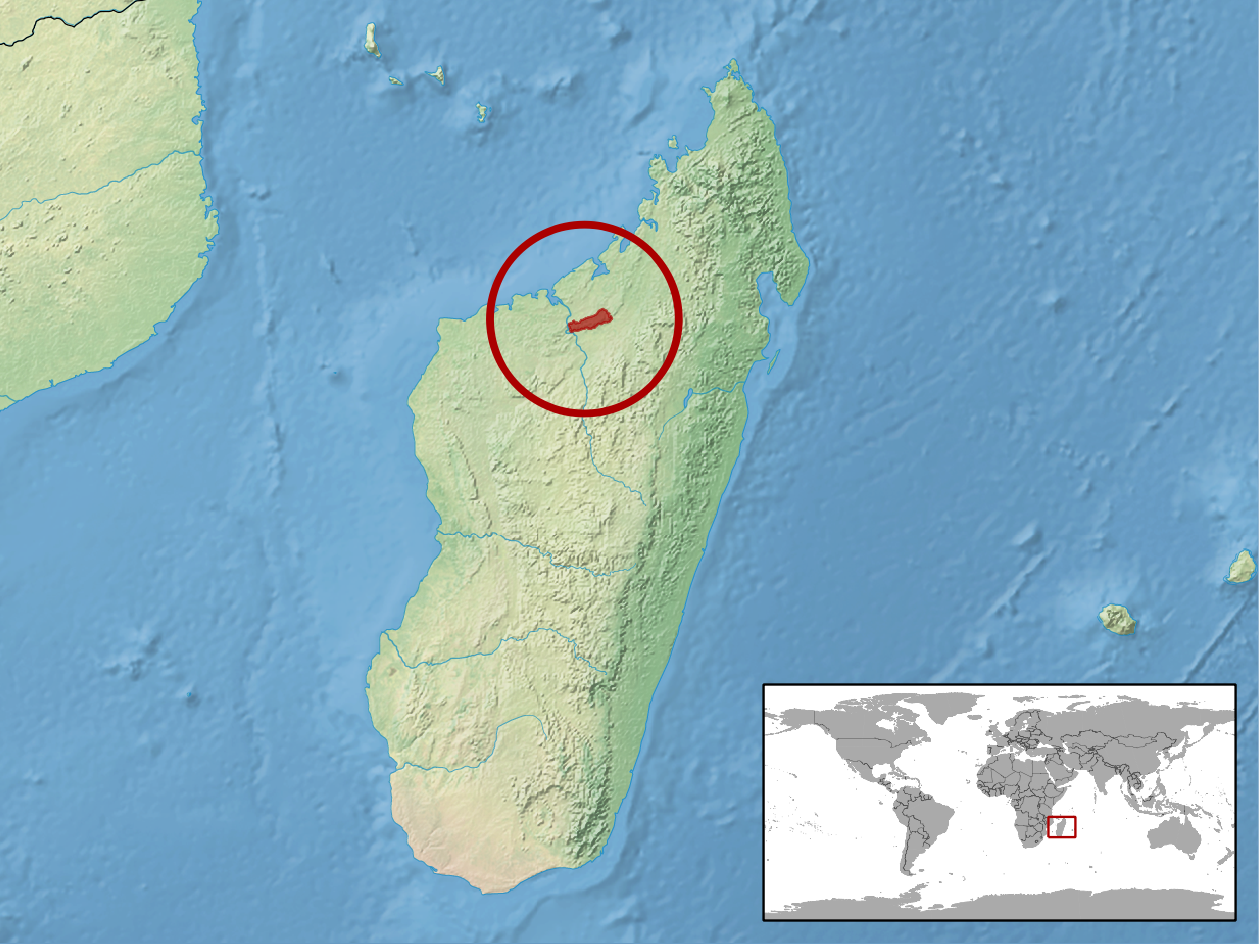

= Brookesia decaryi =

Species of lizard

Brookesia decaryi is a species of chameleon, which is endemic to Madagascar, and is ranked as an endangered species by the International Union for Conservation of Nature (IUCN). It was initially described in 1939 by Fernand Angel. B. decaryi is commonly known as Decary's leaf chameleon, spiny leaf chameleon, or Decary's pygmy chameleon.

== Etymology ==
The specific name, decaryi, is in honor of French botanist Raymond Decary.

== Geographic range ==
Brookesia decaryi can only be found on the island of Madagascar in Ankarafantsika National Park (Parc National d'Ankarafantsika), northwest Madagascar.

== Habitat ==
Brookesia decaryi can only be found at elevations under 200 m (660 ft) above sea level. The species can be found over an area of 1,300 km^{2} (500 sq mi) – the size of the Parc National d'Ankarafantsika – in dry forest.

== Reproduction ==
Brookesia decaryi is oviparous. However, details about its reproduction are unknown, although clutch sizes between two and five eggs have previously been found.

== Behavior ==
Brookesia decaryi is diurnal (sleeps at night, awake in the day) and sleeps at a mean height of 0.17 metres (0.56 ft), mainly on small plants, logs (fallen), and small trees.

== Conservation status ==
Brookesia decaryi is classed as endangered by the IUCN, and the population might be decreasing. It is protected under the laws of Malagasy (Madagascar), although it can be collected, if authorised. However, collection in the Parc National d'Ankarafantsika is not permitted. The spiny leaf chameleon is threatened by wood harvesting, fires, farming, and ranching.
