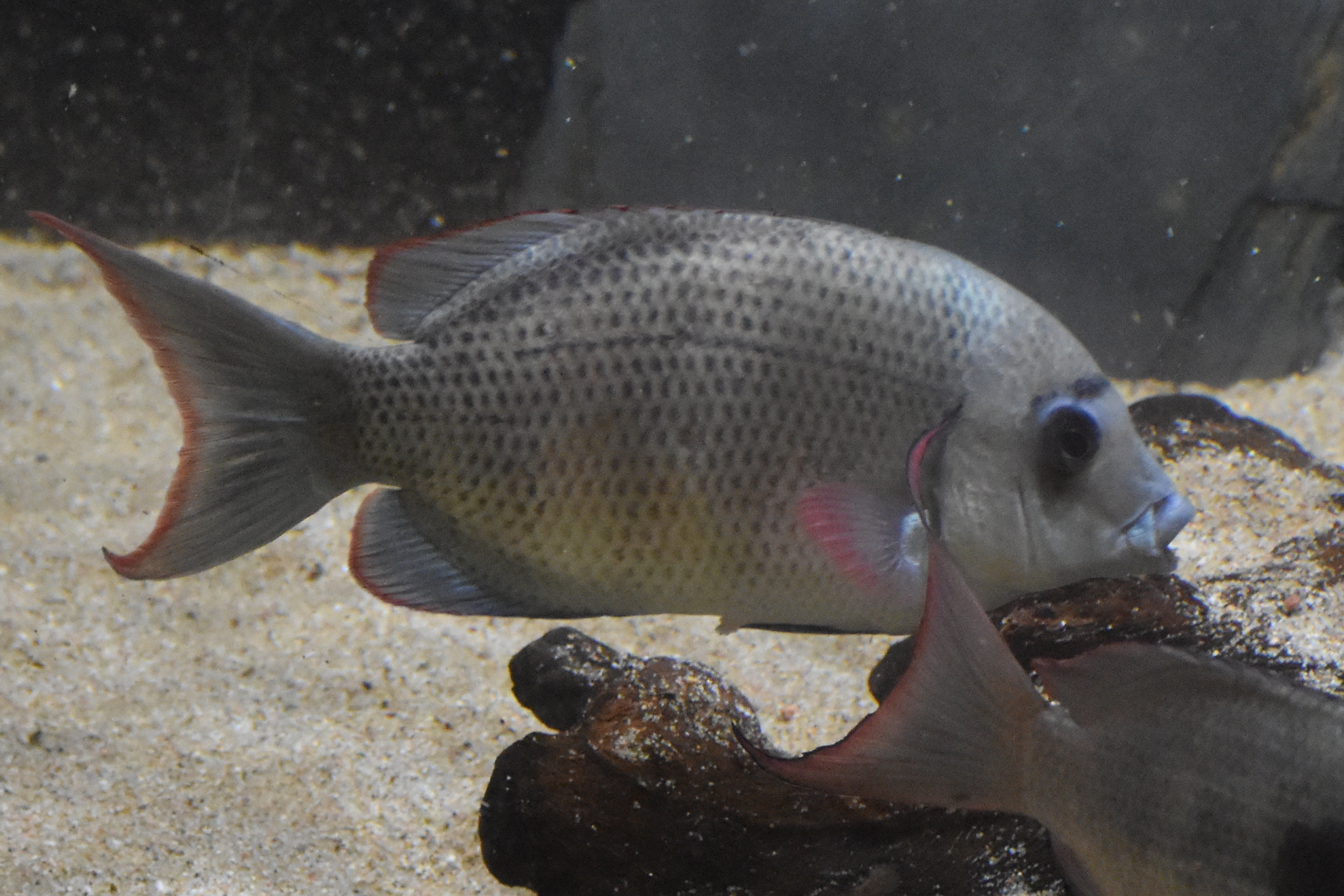
- Paretroplus menarambo

Scientific classification
- Kingdom: Animalia
- Phylum: Chordata
- Class: Actinopterygii
- Order: Cichliformes
- Family: Cichlidae
- Subfamily: Etroplinae
- Genus: Paretroplus; Bleeker, 1868

Type species
- Paretroplus damii Bleeker, 1868

Synonyms
- Lamena Allgayer, 1998

= Paretroplus =

Genus of fishes

Paretroplus is a genus of fishes in the cichlid family, all of which are endemic to lakes and rivers of Madagascar. The vast majority are threatened and restricted to the northwestern part of the island. Only P. polyactis is found in the southern half of Madagascar and only P. polyactis and P. gymnopreopercularis are found in eastern drainages. Most are restricted to freshwater, but at least P. polyactis and P. maromandia can also be seen in brackish habitats.

They are more closely related to the genus Etroplus from India and Sri Lanka than they are to other cichlids from Madagascar (subfamilies Paratilapiinae and Ptychochrominae). Their maximum length varies greatly depending on the exact species, ranging from 15–16 centimetres (5.9–6.3 in) in P. kieneri and P. gymnopreopercularis to almost 40 centimetres (16 in) in P. damii. Paretroplus includes both relatively slender-bodied species (P. damii, P. gymnopreopercularis, P. kieneri, P. lamenabe, P. loisellei, P. nourissati and P. tsimoly) and relatively deep-bodied species (all remaining).

== Species ==
There are currently 14 recognized species in this genus. Additionally, an undescribed species from the P. damii–loisellei species group is known from the Ankofia River basin in northwestern Madagascar.

- Paretroplus dambabe Sparks, 2002
- Paretroplus damii Bleeker, 1868
- Paretroplus gymnopreopercularis Sparks, 2008
- Paretroplus kieneri Arnoult, 1960
- Paretroplus lamenabe Sparks, 2008 (Big red cichlid)
- Paretroplus loisellei Sparks & Schelly, 2011
- Paretroplus maculatus Kiener & Maugé, 1966
- Paretroplus maromandia Sparks & Reinthal, 1999
- Paretroplus menarambo Allgayer, 1996
- Paretroplus nourissati (Allgayer, 1998)
- Paretroplus petiti Pellegrin, 1929
- Paretroplus polyactis Bleeker, 1878
- Paretroplus risengi Sparks & Sparks, 2025
- Paretroplus tsimoly Stiassny, Chakrabarty & Loiselle, 2001

The genus can be divided into several clades, and these include P. lamenabe, P. nourissati and P. tsimoly, which have been considered worthy of placement in their own genus Lamena (still used in their common names). On a higher level these three are part of a clade that also includes P. damii and P. loisellei.
