= Ptychochromis ernestmagnusi =

Conservation status
- Data Deficient (IUCN 3.1)

Scientific classification
- Domain: Eukaryota
- Kingdom: Animalia
- Phylum: Chordata
- Class: Actinopterygii
- Order: Cichliformes
- Family: Cichlidae
- Genus: Ptychochromis
- Species: P. ernestmagnusi

Binomial name
- Ptychochromis ernestmagnusi Sparks & Stiassny, 2010

Species of fish

Ptychochromis ernestmagnusi is a species of fish cichlid only known from the Mananara du Nord River in northeastern Madagascar, but it is probably more widespread in that region. If so, it likely occurs in the Mananara-Nord Biosphere Reserve (near the town Mananara Nord), which would give it a level of protection. It can reach 14.7 cm (5.8 in) in standard length.

== Etymology ==
The specific name honours Ernest Magnus (1908-1983) who was the uncle of the German-American marine biologist and ichthyologist Rudolf Arndt who gave generous support to the author's research, at the request of Anrdt's family, whose “generous gift” supported the authors’ research. Magnus played an important part in assisting the Arndt family to survive in Berlin after the Second World War and then emigrate to New York City in 1950, by giving them "food, clothing, shelter, love, many kindnesses and moral support".
