= Sauvagella madagascariensis =

Conservation status
- Least Concern (IUCN 3.1)

Scientific classification
- Kingdom: Animalia
- Phylum: Chordata
- Class: Actinopterygii
- Order: Clupeiformes
- Family: Ehiravidae
- Genus: Sauvagella
- Species: S. madagascariensis

Binomial name
- Sauvagella madagascariensis (Sauvage, 1883)

Species of fish

Sauvagella madagascariensis is a small species of fish in the family Clupeidae. It is endemic to fresh and brackish water in rivers of eastern Madagascar, ranging from the Mananjary to the Mananara. This relatively slender fish reaches a length of 6.6 cm (2.6 in), and is usually pale yellow with silvery on the flanks and head, though some larger individuals are more strongly coloured with orange or red.
