= Anjiajia =

- Location in Madagascar
- Coordinates: 16°29′S 46°58′E
- Country: Madagascar
- Region: Boeny
- District: Ambato-Boeni
- Elevation: 27 m (89 ft)

Population (2001)
  - Total: 13,000
- Time zone: UTC3 (EAT)
- Postal code: 403

Anjiajia is a rural municipality in Madagascar. It belongs to the district of Ambato-Boeni, which is a part of Boeny Region. The population of the commune was estimated to be approximately 13,000 in the 2001 commune census.

Primary and junior-level secondary education are available in town. The majority 85% of the population of the commune are farmers, while an additional 8% receive their livelihood from raising livestock. The most important crops are rice and cotton, while other important agricultural products are peanuts and beans. Services provide employment for 2% of the population. Additionally, fishing employs 5% of the population.

== Energy ==
In 2010 the first unit of production of electricity by biomass in Madagascar had been inaugurated in Anjiajia. It is driven with a rice hull and has a capacity of 40 kW x 2. Since 2021 also a micro-hydroelectric power plant with a capacity of 80 kW had been installed.

== Roads ==
Anjiajia is situated on the National road 4 from Mahajanga to Antananarivo.
