= Paretroplus gymnopreopercularis =

Conservation status
- Critically Endangered (IUCN 3.1)

Scientific classification
- Kingdom: Animalia
- Phylum: Chordata
- Class: Actinopterygii
- Division: Teleostei
- Order: Cichliformes
- Family: Cichlidae
- Genus: Paretroplus
- Species: P. gymnopreopercularis

Binomial name
- Paretroplus gymnopreopercularis Sparks, 2008

Species of fish

Paretroplus gymnopreopercularis is a species of cichlid from the vicinity of the confluence of the Amboaboa and Mangarahara Rivers near Mandritsara in northern Madagascar. Until its official scientific description in 2008, it was temporarily known as the Paretroplus nov. sp. "sofia". It is critically endangered because of habitat degradation, overfishing and invasive species. Following the construction of a dam on the Mangarahara River, surveys have failed to relocate P. gymnopreopercularis in this river.

This relatively elongate Paretroplus reaches about 15 centimetres (5.9 in) in length and is closely related to P. kieneri, which it resembles. P. nourissati is found in the same region as P. gymnopreopercularis, but the latter appears to be restricted to deeper pools in the river (the former is from shallow, fast-flowing sections). The member of another cichlid genus, Ptychochromis insolitus, is also restricted to the region.

Its habitat is shallow, clear rivers with a fast current and many areas of small waterfalls and riffles, normally with a rocky river bed, with many boulders, with sandy areas mixed in. This species shows a preference for deeper, more isolated pools.
