= Paretroplus nourissati =

Conservation status
- Endangered (IUCN 3.1)

Scientific classification
- Kingdom: Animalia
- Phylum: Chordata
- Class: Actinopterygii
- Order: Cichliformes
- Family: Cichlidae
- Genus: Paretroplus
- Species: P. nourissati

Binomial name
- Paretroplus nourissati (Allgayer, 1998)

Synonyms
- Lamena nourissati Allgayer, 1998

Species of fish

Paretroplus nourissati, the lamena, is a species of cichlid from the vicinity of the confluence of the Amboaboa and Mangarahara Rivers near Mandritsara in northern Madagascar. This relatively elongate Paretroplus reaches about 16 centimetres (6.3 in) in length, and is closely related to P. lamenabe and P.tsimoly. P. nourissati is threatened by habitat loss and invasive species.

Like other members of the lamena group, it is a rheophile (although less so than Oxylapia polli), and typically found in river sections that are shallow, clear and fast-flowing. P. gymnopreopercularis is found in the same region, but it appears to be restricted to deeper pools in the river. A member of another cichlid genus, Ptychochromis insolitus, is also restricted to the region.

The specific name honours the cichlid aquarist Jean Claude Nourissat (1942-2003).
