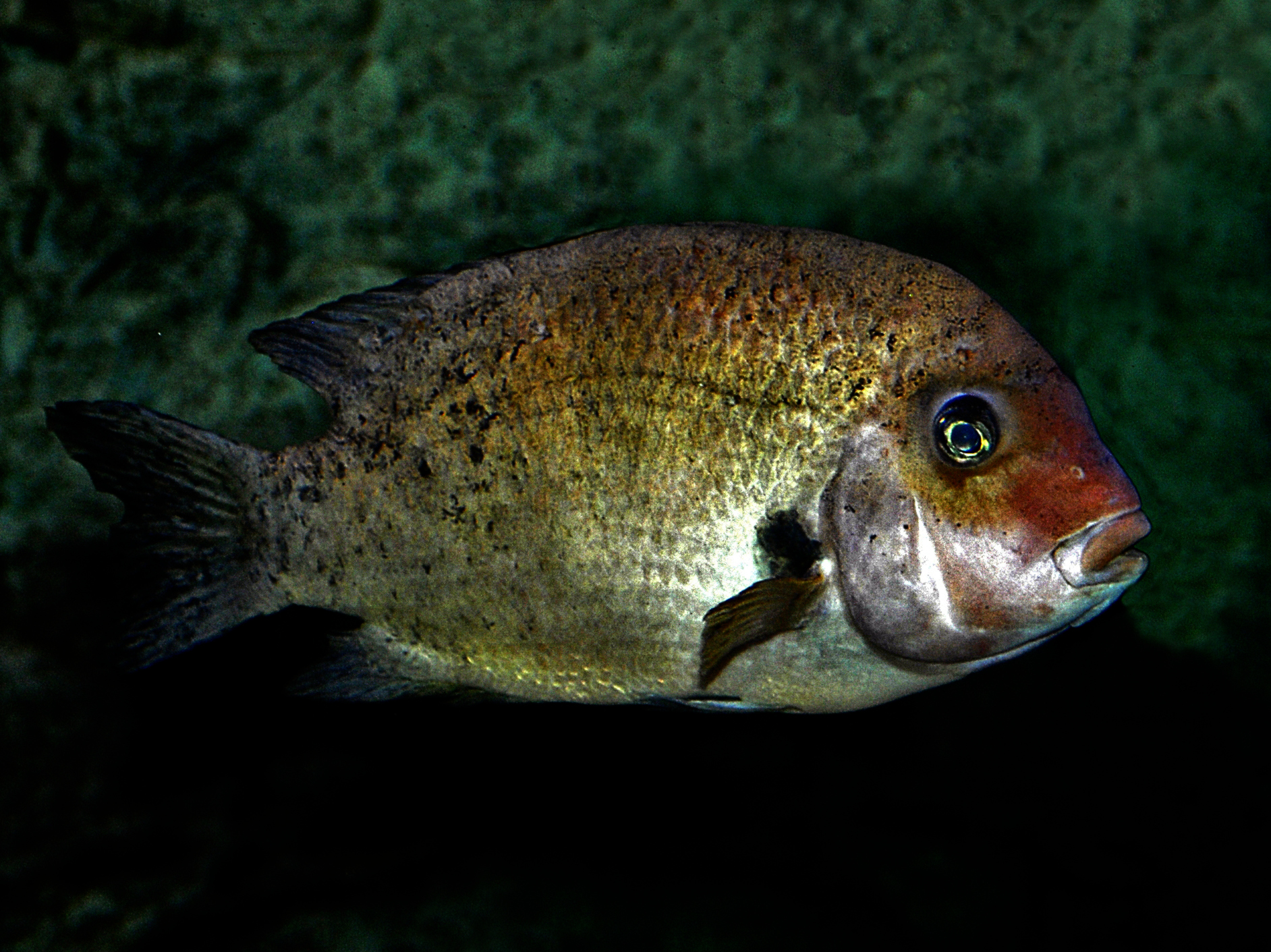

Conservation status
- Vulnerable (IUCN 3.1)

Scientific classification
- Kingdom: Animalia
- Phylum: Chordata
- Class: Actinopterygii
- Order: Cichliformes
- Family: Cichlidae
- Genus: Paretroplus
- Species: P. damii

Binomial name
- Paretroplus damii Bleeker, 1868

Synonyms
- Paretroplus dami Bleeker, 1868 (orth. error); Paretroplus vandami Sauvage, 1891 (ambiguous name)

= Damba =

Species of fish

The damba (Paretroplus damii) is a species of cichlid.

== Etymology ==
The genus name Paretroplus is composed by the Greek Para (meaning similar to) and Etroplus (a closely related genus of Indian cichlids). The Latin species name damii honors the naturalist Douwe Casparus van Dam (1827-1898).

== Description ==
P. damii is the largest Paretroplus, reaching the total length of about 17–40 centimetres (6.7–15.7 in). No sexual dimorphism exists in size or in other characteristics. These fishes have a rounded shape, with a light pink / grey colouration in absence of vertical barring.

== Distribution ==
This species can be found in several river basins in northwestern Madagascar.

This includes populations in far northern Madagascar that some have speculated represented an undescribed species, but a comparison of specimens did not support this, instead maintaining them as part of P. damii.

In contrast, populations in the Mahanara River in northeastern Madagascar were formerly also included in P. damii, but these were described as a separate species, P. loisellei, in 2011, and populations in the Ankofia River basin in northwestern Madagascar (south of true P. damii) appear to represent a closely related undescribed species.

== Bibliography ==
- Eschmeyer, William N., ed. 1998. Catalog of Fishes. Special Publication of the Center for Biodiversity Research and Information, núm. 1, vol. 1–3. California Academy of Sciences. San Francisco, California, United States. 2905. ISBN 0-940228-47-5.
- Fenner, Robert M.: The Conscientious Marine Aquarist. Neptune City, New Jersey, USA : T.F.H. Publications, 2001.
- Helfman, G., B. Collette y D. Facey: The diversity of fishes. Blackwell Science, Malden, Massachusetts, USA, 1997.
- Hoese, D.F. 1986: . A M.M. Smith y P.C. Heemstra (eds.) Smiths' sea fishes. Springer-Verlag, Berlin, Germany.
- Maugé, L.A. 1986. A J. Daget, J.-P. Gosse y D.F.E. Thys van den Audenaerde (eds.) Check-list of the freshwater fishes of Africa (CLOFFA). ISNB, Brussels; MRAC, Tervuren; y ORSTOM, Paris, France. Vol. 2.
- Moyle, P. y J. Cech.: Fishes: An Introduction to Ichthyology, 4th. Ed., Upper Saddle River, New Jersey, USA: Prentice-Hall.
- Nelson, J.: Fishes of the World, 3rd. ed.. New York, USA: John Wiley and Sons.
- Wheeler, A.: The World Encyclopedia of Fishes, 2nd. Ed, London: Macdonald.
