= Sauvagella =

Scientific classification
- Domain: Eukaryota
- Kingdom: Animalia
- Phylum: Chordata
- Class: Actinopterygii
- Order: Clupeiformes
- Family: Ehiravidae
- Genus: Sauvagella; Bertin, 1940

Genus of fishes

Sauvagella is a genus of small fresh and brackish water fish in the family Clupeidae. There are currently two species, both of which are endemic to Madagascar.

== Species ==
- Sauvagella madagascariensis (Sauvage, 1883) (Madagascar round herring)
- Sauvagella robusta Stiassny, 2002
