= Paretroplus tsimoly =

Conservation status
- Endangered (IUCN 3.1)

Scientific classification
- Kingdom: Animalia
- Phylum: Chordata
- Class: Actinopterygii
- Order: Cichliformes
- Family: Cichlidae
- Genus: Paretroplus
- Species: P. tsimoly

Binomial name
- Paretroplus tsimoly Stiassny, Chakrabarty & Loiselle, 2001

Species of fish

Paretroplus tsimoly is a species of cichlid fish from the Betsiboka River basin in northwestern Madagascar. Like other members of the lamena group, it is a rheophile (although less so than Oxylapia polli). This relatively elongate Paretroplus reaches about 16 centimetres (6.3 in) in length, and is closely related to P. lamenabe and P. nourissati.
