= Ptychochromis curvidens =

Conservation status
- Data Deficient (IUCN 3.1)

Scientific classification
- Kingdom: Animalia
- Phylum: Chordata
- Class: Actinopterygii
- Order: Cichliformes
- Family: Cichlidae
- Genus: Ptychochromis
- Species: P. curvidens

Binomial name
- Ptychochromis curvidens Stiassny & Sparks, 2006

Species of fish

Ptychochromis curvidens is an endangered species of fish in the cichlid family. It is endemic to a few rivers that flow west from Montagne d'Ambre in far northern Madagascar. It is threatened by habitat loss and introduced species. It reaches about 14.7 cm (5.8 in) in standard length.
