= Bombetoka Bay =

Bay in Madagascar

Coordinates: 15°48′55″S 46°16′13″E

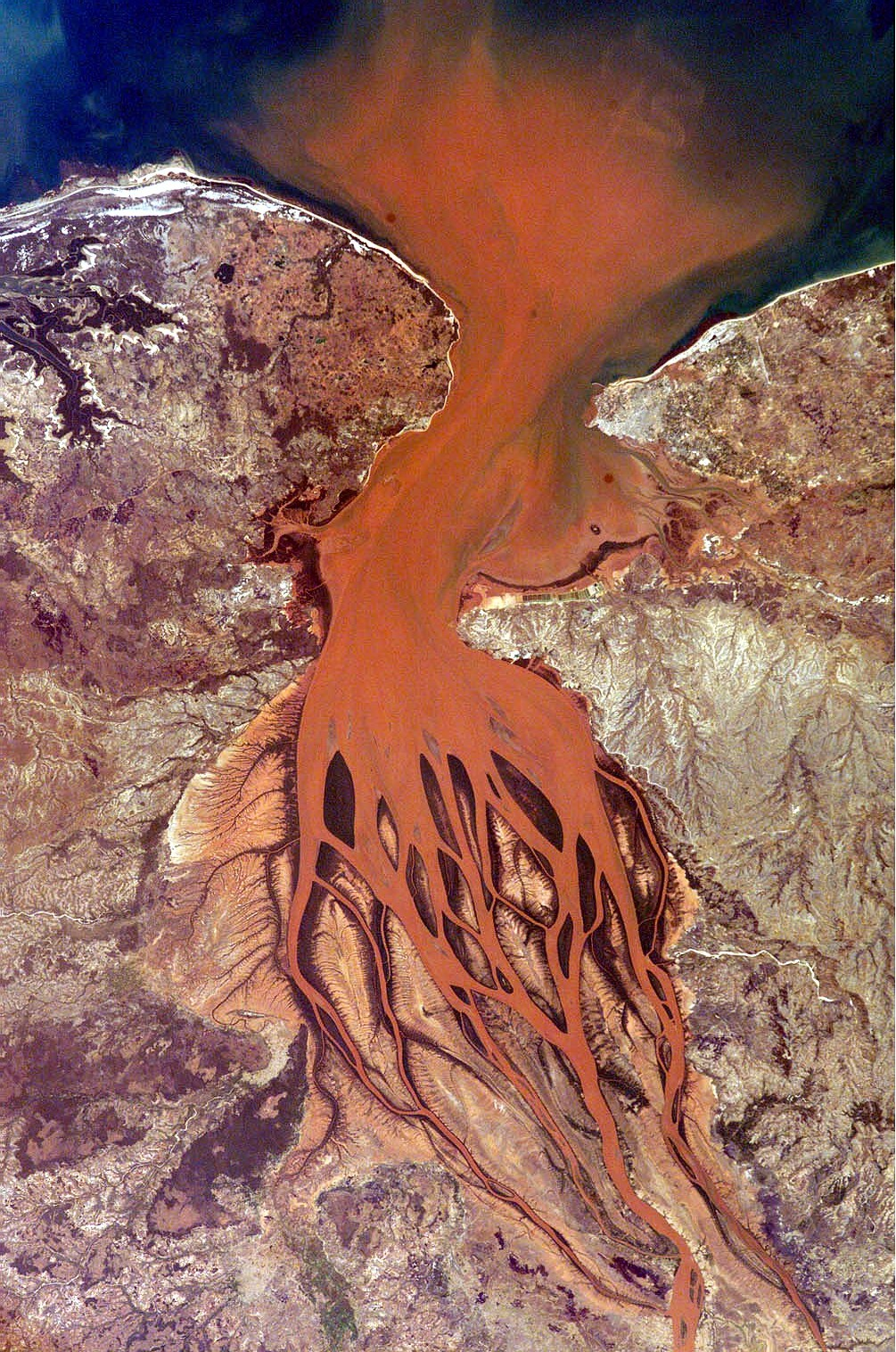
Betsiboka River estuary and Bombetoka Bay seen from space. (North is to the right.)

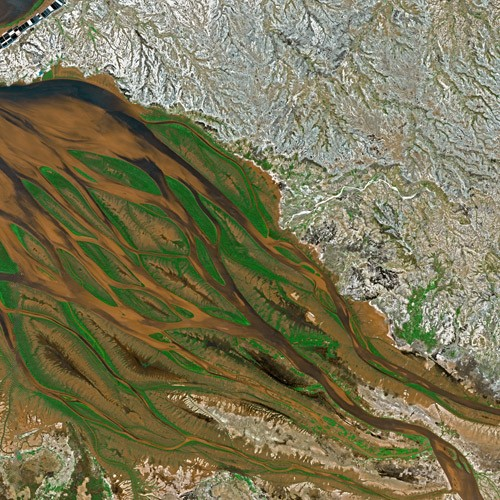
Bombetoka Bay seen by Spot satellite.

Bombetoka Bay is a bay on the northwestern coast of Madagascar near the city of Mahajanga, where the Betsiboka River flows into the Mozambique Channel. Numerous islands and sandbars have formed in the estuary from the large amount of sediment carried in by the Betsiboka River and have been shaped by the flow of the river and the push and pull of tides.

Along coastlines and on the islands, the vegetation is predominantly mangrove forests. In fact, Bombetoka Bay is home to some of Madagascar's largest remaining communities of mangroves, which provide shelter for diverse mollusk and crustacean communities, as well as habitat for sea turtles, birds, and dugongs. Along the northwest coast of Madagascar, mangroves and coral reefs partner to create dynamic, diverse coastal ecosystems. The mangrove forests capture river-borne sediment that would smother coastal reefs, while reefs buffer the mangroves from pounding surf.

Near water, shrimp and rice farming are common, while coffee plantations abound in the surrounding terrain.

Sediment transport and suspension in Bombetoka Bay has significantly changed during the past 30 years, with a dramatic increase in the amount of sediment moved by the Betsiboka river, and deposited in the estuary and in offshore delta lobes. These changes have adversely affected agriculture, fisheries, and transportation for one of Madagascar's largest ports.
