= Manerinerina =

- Location in Madagascar
- Coordinates: 16°17′S 47°17′E
- Country: Madagascar
- Region: Boeny
- District: Ambato-Boeni

Area
  - Total: 337.02 km^{2} (130.12 sq mi)
- Elevation: 71 m (233 ft)

Population (2018)
  - Total: 26,675
- Time zone: UTC3 (EAT)
- Postal code: 403

Manerinerina is a rual municipality in Madagascar. It belongs to the district of Ambato-Boeni, which is a part of Boeny Region. The population of the commune was 26,675 in 2018

Manerinerina is served by a local airport. In addition to primary schooling, the town offers secondary education at both junior and senior levels. The town provides access to hospital services to its citizens.

The majority 50% of the population of the commune are farmers, while an additional 45% receives their livelihood from raising livestock. The most important crop is rice, while other important products are peanuts, cotton and cowpeas. Services provide employment for 2% of the population. Additionally fishing employs 3% of the population.

== Infrastructure ==
- Route Nationale 6 from Antananarivo and Mahajanga to Diego Suarez.

== Sports ==
- Espoir Manerinerina (football)
