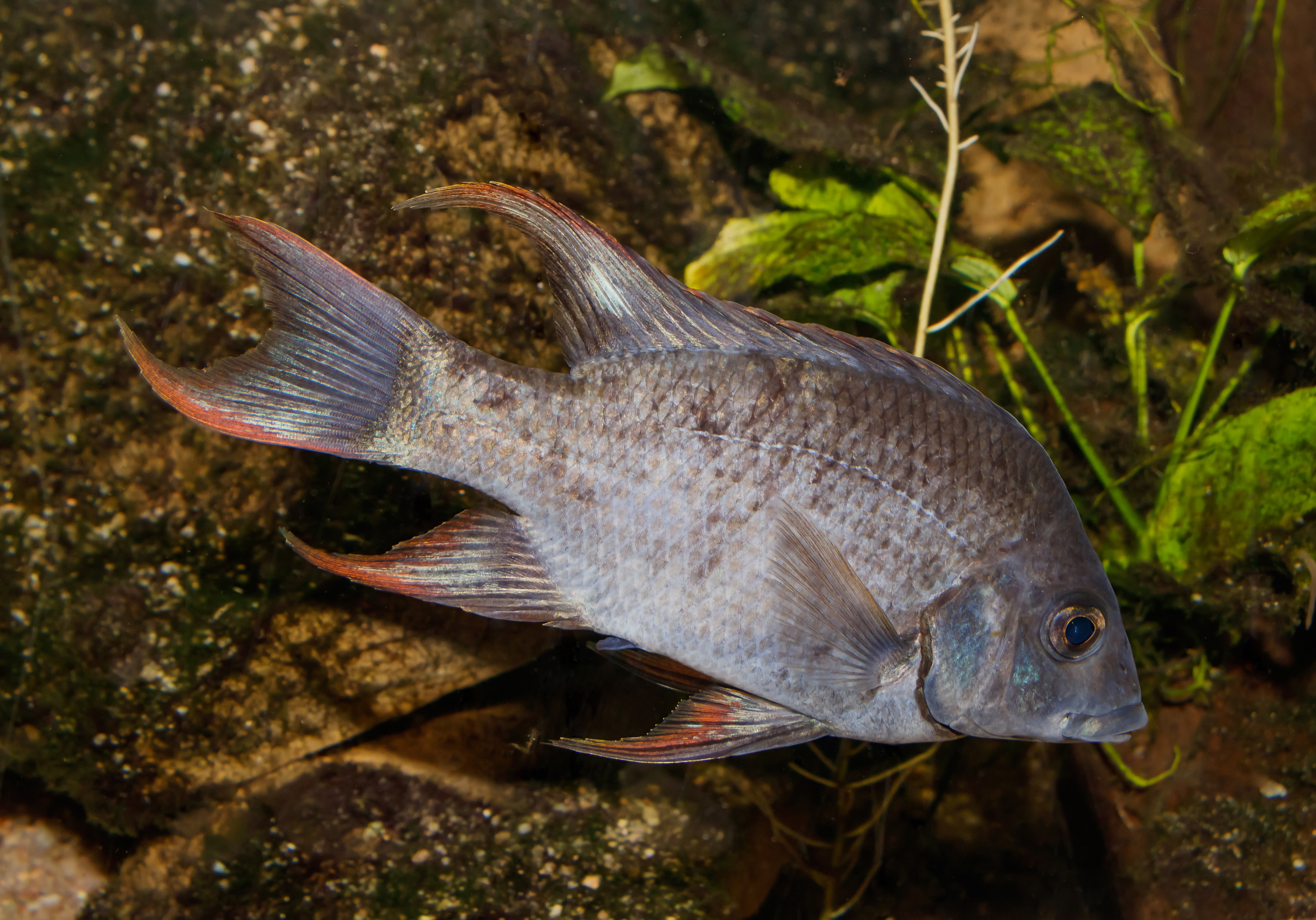

Conservation status
- Critically Endangered (IUCN 3.1)

Scientific classification
- Domain: Eukaryota
- Kingdom: Animalia
- Phylum: Chordata
- Class: Actinopterygii
- Order: Cichliformes
- Family: Cichlidae
- Genus: Ptychochromis
- Species: P. insolitus

Binomial name
- Ptychochromis insolitus Stiassny & Sparks, 2006

= Ptychochromis insolitus =

Species of fish

Ptychochromis insolitus, also known as the Mangarahara cichlid or joba mena, is a species of cichlid endemic to certain river systems in northern Madagascar. This critically endangered fish is threatened by habitat loss and competition from introduced species; after the last-known female was killed during a breeding attempt, its conservation received significant international attention as London Zoo launched a media campaign to identify any remaining individuals. A remnant population was discovered by aquaculture entrepreneur Guy Tam Hyock in 2013, and breeding programs in Madagascar and at Toronto Zoo have resulted in thousands of successful hatchlings.

== Description ==
The Mangarahara cichlid was first described as a new species in 2006 from the Amboaboa and Mangarahara Rivers near Mandritsara in northern Madagascar. Prior to its official description, it was sometimes known as Ptychochromis sp. nov. "Joba mena" or Ptychochromis sp. nov. "Mangarahara". "Joba mena" translates to "red girl", identifying the long, ragged, red-bordered fins of the male fish. This species can reach a standard length of 10 inches or 25.8 cm. It was given the species name insolitus (the Latin word for 'queer' or 'unusual') in part because of its peculiar appearance, featuring long tooth- or comb-like structures called cteni on many of its scales. This name was also chosen because after identifying a wild-caught holotype specimen, researchers investigated two captive-raised individuals that strangely lacked several of the defining characteristics for which the species was described. Researchers suggested this could, among other possibilities, indicate an unrecorded hybridization event or the existence of an additional, similar species or subspecies.

== Status ==
It was originally listed as Critically Endangered in 2006 when they were first described, but on further research they concluded that they were in fact Extinct in the Wild. It is listed as Extinct in the Wild by the IUCN, but until its rediscovery in 2013, it was feared that the last remaining wild population had disappeared as a result of ongoing habitat loss and competition from introduced species. Two cichlids from another genus, Paretroplus nourissati and P. gymnopreopercularis, along with a round herring, Sauvagella robusta, are restricted to the same region as Ptychochromis insolitus, and may be facing similar risks.

Although captive breeding programs have met with some success, and although it continues to occur in the wild, the habitat of this species remains under significant threat, and thus, opportunities for reintroduction remain unclear.

== Conservation efforts ==
In the 1990s, a French ichthyologist collected several specimens of the fish from its wild habitat. An anonymous hobbyist couple bred those specimens, and in 2002, the couple donated a dozen juvenile Mangarahara cichlids to London Zoo. At the time, little was known about the condition of the species' native habitat, and Brian Zimmerman, Chief Curator of the Zoological Society of London, believed that other institutions housed the species as well. Territoriality and rivalry among the maturing siblings contributed to several cichlid deaths, and by 2005, only two male individuals remained in the zoo's collection.

In 2006, London Zoo contacts in Madagascar reported that the Mangarahara River had dried up as a result of dam construction and water diversion for rice farming in the area. The fish was declared extinct in the wild. As the only institution with a female specimen of the cichlid in its care, Aquarium Berlin attempted to breed its male cichlid with its female cichlid in 2012. Approximately ten days after the two individuals were moved to a spawning tank, Aquarium Berlin announced that the male cichlid had killed its would-be mate.

In 2013, only three specimens were known to exist in captivity—two males in London Zoo and one male in Aquarium Berlin. Those in London Zoo were at least eleven years old, and little was known about the life expectancy of the species. London Zoo published an appeal in May 2013, asking for any information about potentially suitable female Mangarahara cichlids in private collections. After leads from collectors in Venezuela, China, Australia, Canada, and elsewhere did not surface any living cichlids, Zimmerman was contacted by hotelier, tilapia farmer, and "Fish Whisperer" Guy Tam Hyock. Guy Tam Hyock offered to show representatives from London Zoo to a small pond near Marotandrano where he believed a population of the fishes remained.

In late 2013, Toronto Zoo and London Zoo confirmed that a remnant population existed in the wild at the location Guy Tam Hyock specified. The last 18 wild individuals, including some females, were caught and moved to Guy Tam Hyock's conservation aquaculture facility in Andapa, Madagascar. Successful captive breeding was observed at said facility shortly thereafter, and in September 2014, several individuals were brought to Toronto Zoo. On September 15, 2016, Toronto Zoo announced the cichlid had successfully bred at their facility, issuing at least 20 hatchlings.
