= Andranomamy =

- Location in Madagascar
- Coordinates: 16°36′S 47°8′E
- Country: Madagascar
- Region: Boeny
- District: Ambato-Boeni
- Elevation: 77 m (253 ft)

Population (2001)
  - Total: 13,000
- Time zone: UTC3 (EAT)
- Postal code: 403

Andranomamy is a rural municipality in Madagascar. It belongs to the district of Ambato-Boeni, which is a part of Boeny Region. The population of the commune was estimated to be approximately 13,000 in 2001 commune census.

Primary and junior level secondary education are available in town. The majority 80% of the population of the commune are farmers, while an additional 10% receives their livelihood from raising livestock. The most important crop is maize, while other important products are peanuts, bananas, sweet potatoes and rice. Services provide employment for 5% of the population. Additionally fishing employs 5% of the population.

== Infrastructure ==
- Route Nationale 4 from Antananarivo to Mahajanga.
