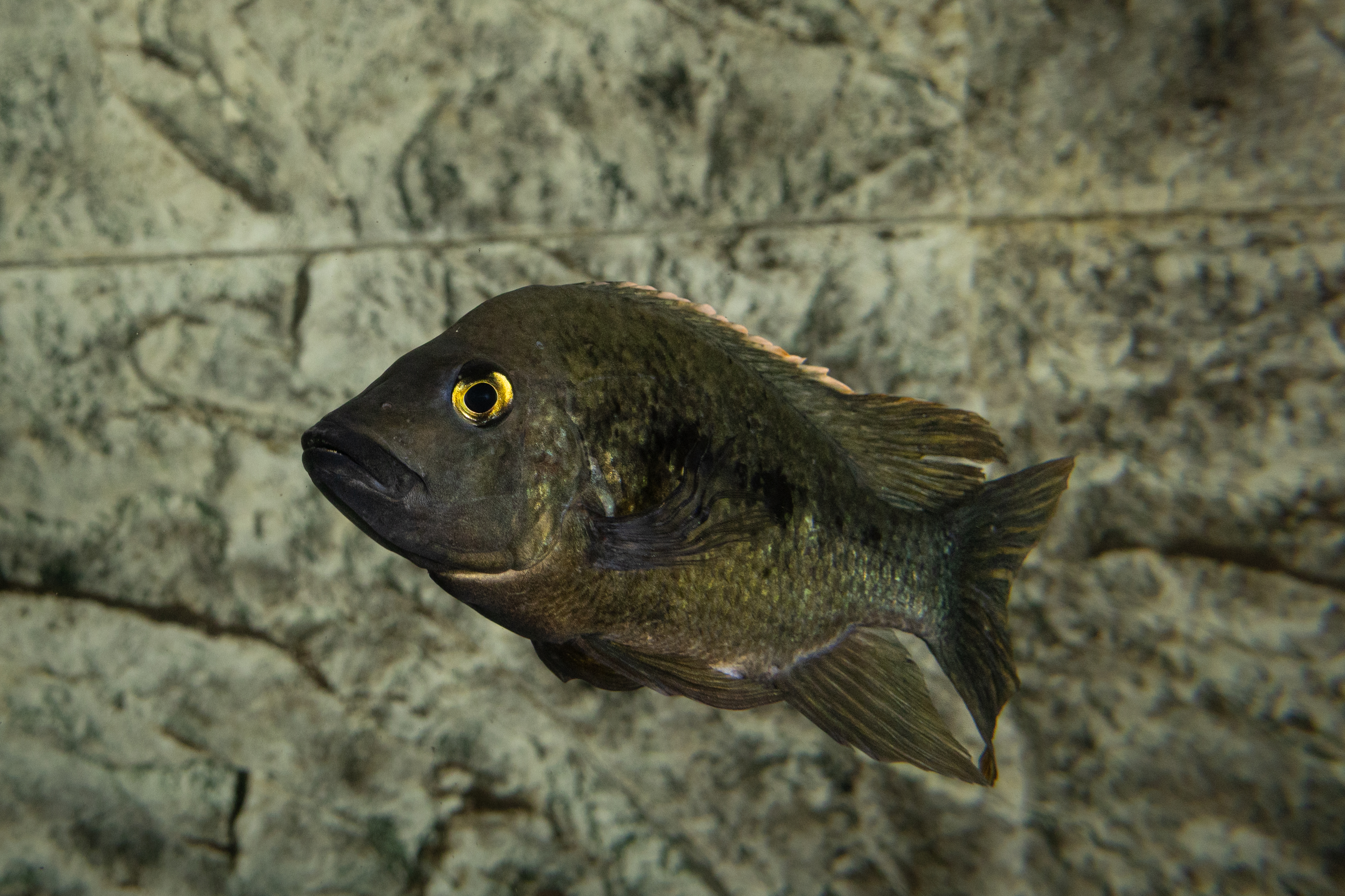

Conservation status
- Least Concern (IUCN 3.1)

Scientific classification
- Kingdom: Animalia
- Phylum: Chordata
- Class: Actinopterygii
- Order: Cichliformes
- Family: Cichlidae
- Genus: Ptychochromis
- Species: P. grandidieri

Binomial name
- Ptychochromis grandidieri Sauvage, 1882

Synonyms
- Tilapia grandidieri (Sauvage, 1882); Ptychochromis madagascariensis Liénard, 1891; Tilapia madagascariensis (Liénard, 1891)

= Ptychochromis grandidieri =

Species of fish

Ptychochromis grandidieri is a species of fish in the family Cichlidae endemic to river basins along a large part of the eastern coast of Madagascar, although it has been recorded as far as 100 km (62 mi) inland. Uniquely in the genus Ptychochromis, this species also occurs in brackish water. It reaches 35cm in standard length. It shares a large part of its range with a cichlid from another genus, Paretroplus polyactis. The specific name honours Alfred Grandidier (1836-1921), the French naturalist and explorer who, with Henri Joseph Léon Humblot (1852-1914), collected the type.
