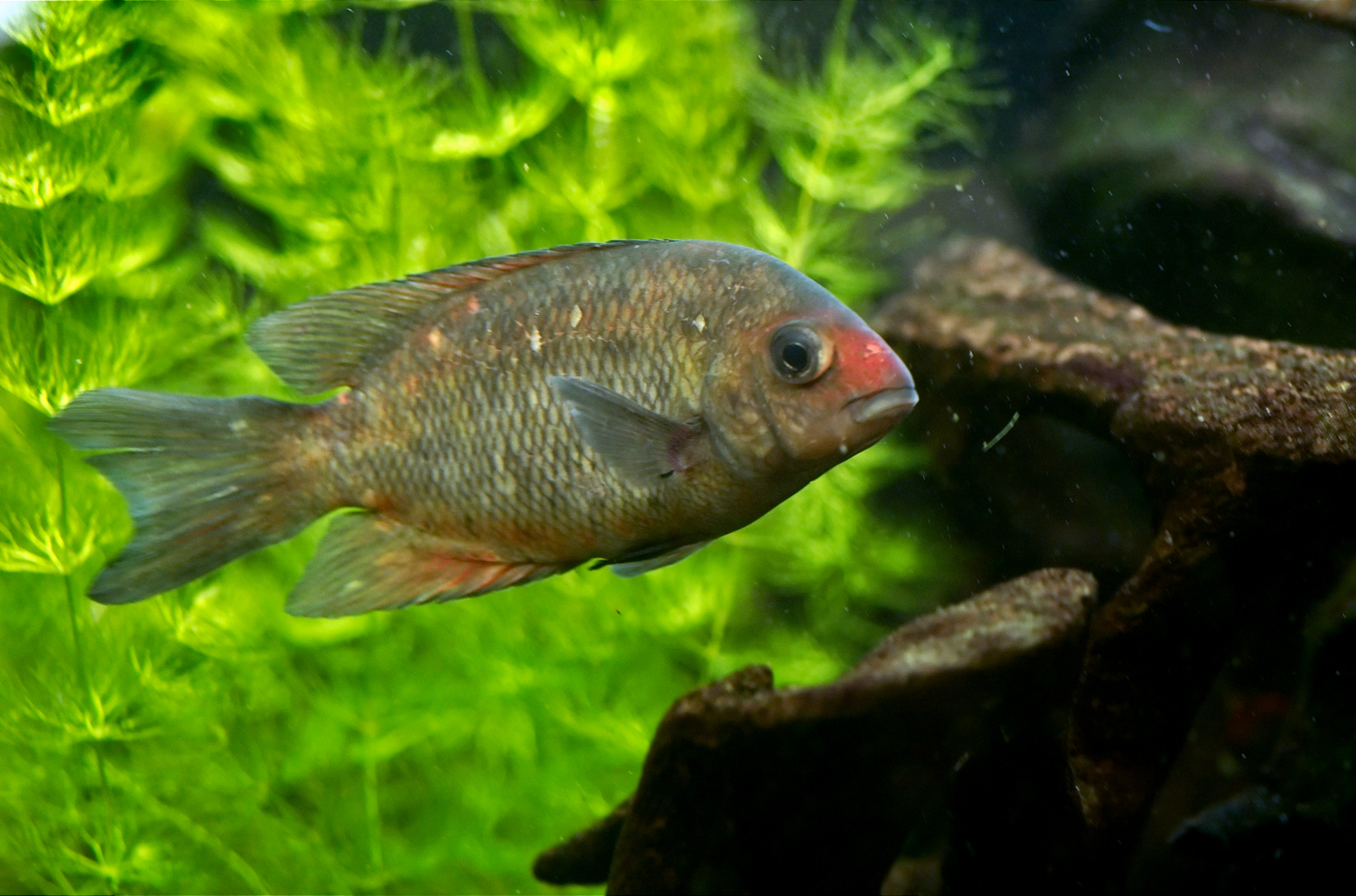

Conservation status
- Vulnerable (IUCN 3.1)

Scientific classification
- Kingdom: Animalia
- Phylum: Chordata
- Class: Actinopterygii
- Order: Cichliformes
- Family: Cichlidae
- Genus: Paretroplus
- Species: P. kieneri

Binomial name
- Paretroplus kieneri Arnoult, 1960

= Kotsovato =

Species of fish

The kotsovato (Paretroplus kieneri) is a species of cichlid from northwestern Madagascar. As presently defined its range spans several river basins, but this could possibly include more than one species. It is threatened by habitat loss and competition from introduced species. This relatively elongate Paretroplus reaches about 16 centimetres (6.3 in) in length and is closely related to P. gymnopreopercularis, which it resembles. The specific name honours the French fisheries scientist André Kiener.
