= Sauvagella robusta =

Conservation status
- Endangered (IUCN 3.1)

Scientific classification
- Kingdom: Animalia
- Phylum: Chordata
- Class: Actinopterygii
- Order: Clupeiformes
- Family: Ehiravidae
- Genus: Sauvagella
- Species: S. robusta

Binomial name
- Sauvagella robusta Stiassny, 2002

Species of fish

Sauvagella robusta is a small species of fish in the family Clupeidae. It is endemic to the Amboaboa and Mangarahara River Basins in northern Madagascar. This relatively slender fish reaches a length of 6.8 cm (2.7 in), and is overall pale yellowish with silvery on the lower parts. Its current population trend is unclear, but the cichlid Ptychochromis insolitus, which is highly threatened from habitat loss, is native to the same region. Sauvagella robusta is known to survive at least in Lake Tseny.
