= Tsaramandroso =

- Location in Madagascar
- Coordinates: 16°22′S 47°6′E
- Country: Madagascar
- Region: Boeny
- District: Ambato-Boeni
- Elevation: 60 m (200 ft)

Population (2001)
  - Total: 5,000
- Time zone: UTC3 (EAT)

Tsaramandroso is a rural municipality in Madagascar. It belongs to the district of Ambato-Boeni, which is a part of Boeny Region. The population of the commune was estimated to be approximately 5,000 in 2001 commune census.

Primary and junior level secondary education are available in town. It is also a site of industrial-scale mining. The majority 80% of the population of the commune are farmers, while an additional 10% receives their livelihood from raising livestock. The most important crops are cotton and maize; also beans are an important agricultural product. Services provide employment for 5% of the population. Additionally fishing employs 5% of the population.

== Infrastructures ==
Tsaramandroso is situated on the National road 4 from Mahajanga to Antananarivo.
