= Paretroplus lamenabe =

Conservation status
- Endangered (IUCN 3.1)

Scientific classification
- Kingdom: Animalia
- Phylum: Chordata
- Class: Actinopterygii
- Order: Cichliformes
- Family: Cichlidae
- Genus: Paretroplus
- Species: P. lamenabe

Binomial name
- Paretroplus lamenabe Sparks, 2008

Species of fish

Paretroplus lamenabe is a species of cichlid from the lower part of the Mahajamba River and Lake Tseny in northwestern Madagascar. Until its official scientific description in 2008, it was popularly known as the "Giant Lamena". As suggested by this name, it is a relatively large Paretroplus of the lamena group, reaching almost 20 centimetres (7.9 in) in length. This relatively elongate Paretroplus is closely related to the smaller P. nourissati and P. tsimoly.
