= Paretroplus loisellei =

Conservation status
- Endangered (IUCN 3.1)

Scientific classification
- Kingdom: Animalia
- Phylum: Chordata
- Class: Actinopterygii
- Order: Cichliformes
- Family: Cichlidae
- Genus: Paretroplus
- Species: P. loisellei

Binomial name
- Paretroplus loisellei Sparks & Schelly, 2011

Species of fish

Paretroplus loisellei is a vulnerable species of cichlid fish from the Mahanara River basin north of Sambava in northeastern Madagascar. Until its scientific description in 2011, this population was usually referred to as Paretroplus sp. nov. "Ventitry" or included in P. damii, which it resembles. It reaches about 15 centimetres (5.9 in) in length, and is threatened by habitat loss and introduced species. The similar named Ptychochromis loisellei is also restricted to the Mahanara River basin. The specific name honours Paul V. Loiselle, emeritus Curator of Freshwater Fishes at the New York Aquarium and a researcher in, and campaigner for the conservation of, the freshwater fish of Madagascar.
