= Andranofasika =

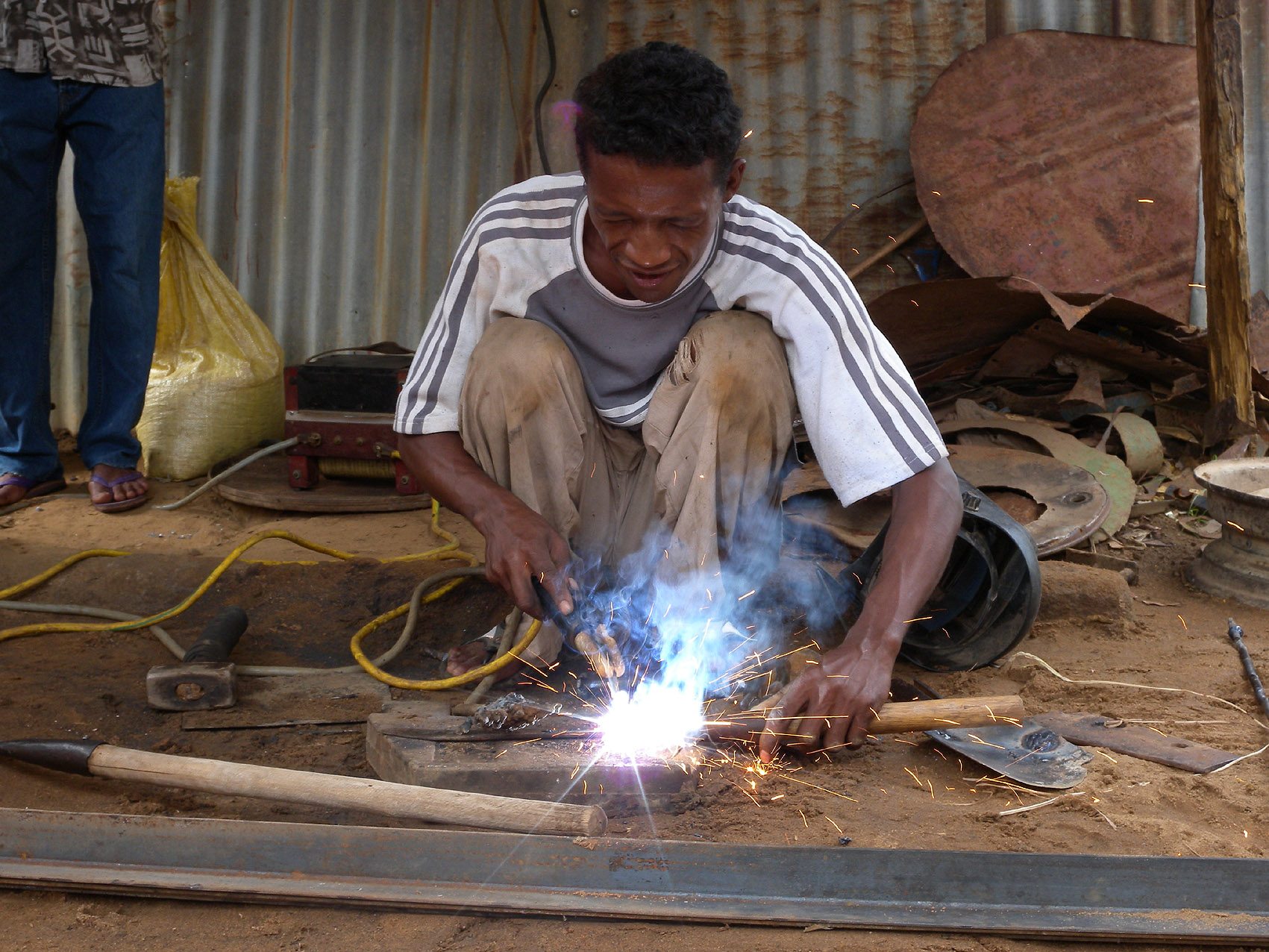
- working at Andranofasika

- Location in Madagascar
- Coordinates: 16°23′S 46°54′E
- Country: Madagascar
- Region: Boeny
- District: Ambato-Boeni
- Elevation: 97 m (318 ft)

Population (2018)
  - Total: 16,971
- Time zone: UTC3 (EAT)
- Postal code: 403

Andranofasika is a rural commune in Madagascar. It belongs to the district of Ambato-Boeni, which is a part of Boeny Region. The population of the commune was estimated to be 16,971 in 2018.

Only primary schooling is available. The majority 85% of the population of the commune are farmers, while an additional 10% receives their livelihood from raising livestock. The most important crop is cassava, while other important products are maize and rice. Services provide employment for 2% of the population. Additionally fishing employs 3% of the population.

== National Parks ==
The office of the Ankarafantsika National Park is situated at 4 km from Andranofasika in Ampijoroa, Marovoay.

== Roads ==
It is situated on the National road 4 to Mahajanga and is the endpoint of the National road 33b.
