= Betsiboka River =

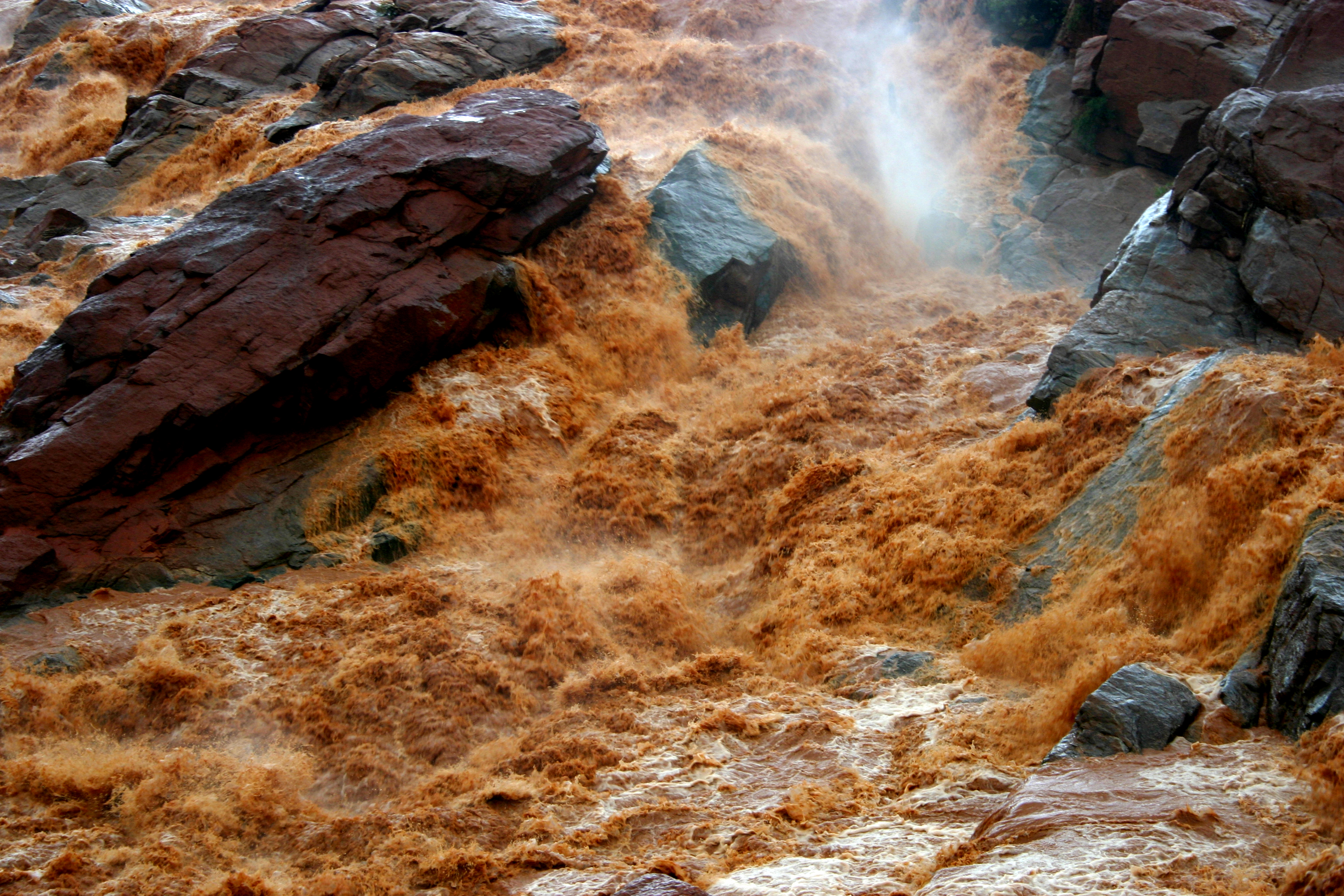
- Rapids in the Betsiboka River

- Map of Malagasy rivers (Betsiboka flows from the center to the northwestern coast).

Location
- Country: Madagascar
- Region: Boeny
- City: Mahajanga, Ambato-Boeny

Physical characteristics
- Source
  - location: Confluence of Jabo and Amparihibe
  - coordinates: 18°21′33″S 47°29′12″E
  - elevation: 939 m (3,081 ft)
- Mouth
  - location: Bombetoka Bay, Mozambique Channel
  - coordinates: 15°48′55″S 46°16′13″E
  - elevation: 0 m (0 ft)
- Length: 525 km (326 mi) to 605 km (376 mi)
- Basin size: 49,000 km^{2} (19,000 sq mi)
- Discharge
  - location: Betsiboka Delta
  - average: (Period: 1971–2000)1,407.1 m^{3}/s (49,690 cu ft/s)
  - minimum: 400 m^{3}/s (14,000 cu ft/s)
  - maximum: 4,500 m^{3}/s (160,000 cu ft/s)

Basin features
- River system: Betsiboka River
- Tributaries
  - left: Jano, Ikopa, Iabohazo
  - right: Amparihibe, Saharanotra, Mananara, Mananta, Isinko, Kamoro

The Betsiboka River is a 525-kilometre (326 mi) long river in central-north Madagascar. It flows northwestward and empties to Bombetoka Bay, forming a large delta. It originates to the east of Antananarivo. The Betsiboka is surrounded in mangroves, and is distinctive for its red-coloured water, which is caused by river sediments. The river carries an enormous amount of reddish-orange silt to the sea. Much of this silt is deposited at the mouth of the river or in the bay.

The Betsiboka provides dramatic evidence of the catastrophic erosion of northwestern Madagascar. Removal of the native forest for cultivation and pastureland during the past 50 years has led to massive annual soil losses approaching 250 metric tonnes per hectare (112 tons per acre) in some regions of the island, the largest amount recorded anywhere in the world. Several fish species are endemic to the river basin, including the three cichlids Paretroplus petiti, P. tsimoly and P. maculatus.

The Betsiboka's largest tributary, the Ikopa River, drains the capital city of Antananarivo.

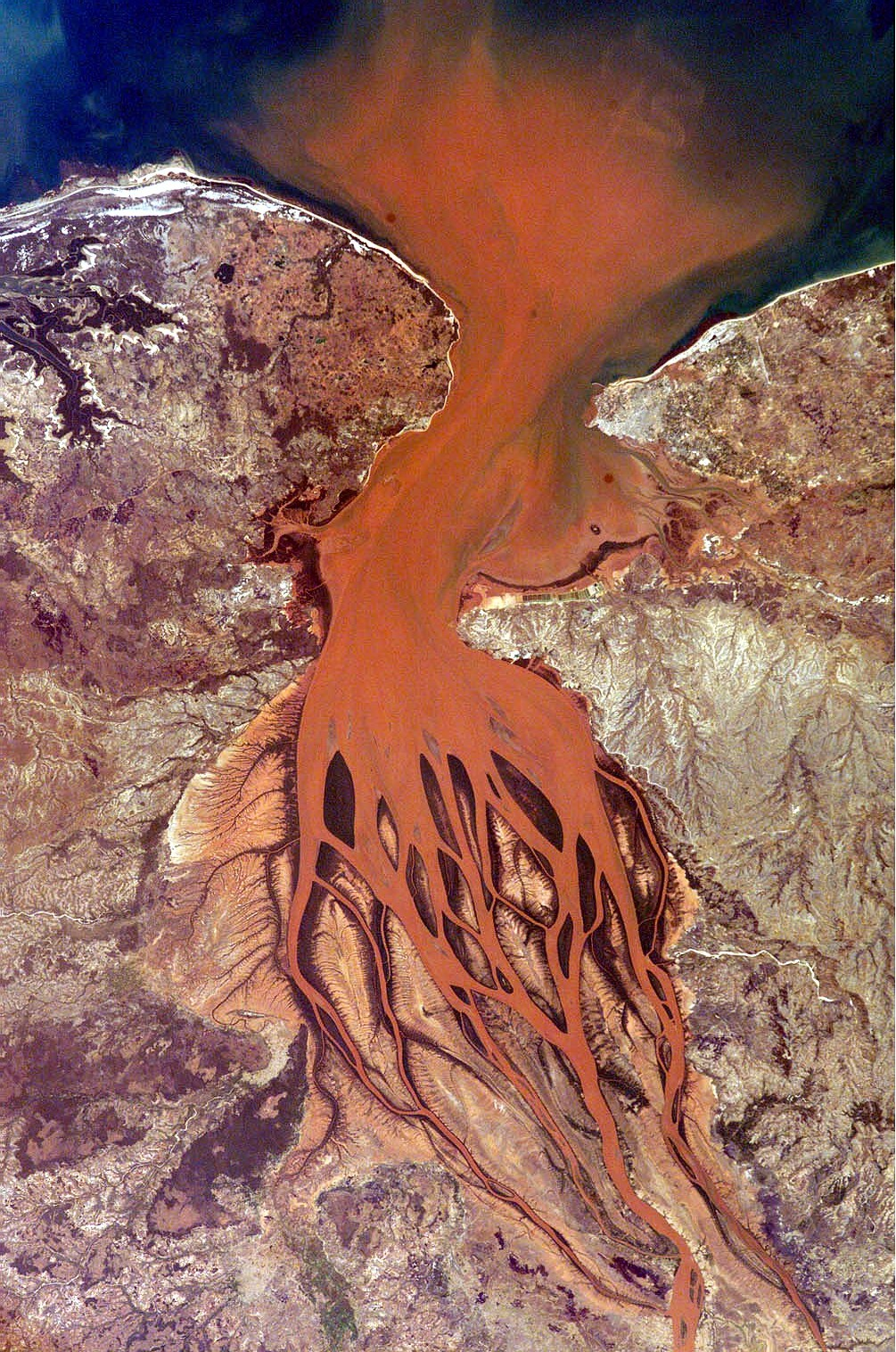
Betsiboka River estuary seen from space

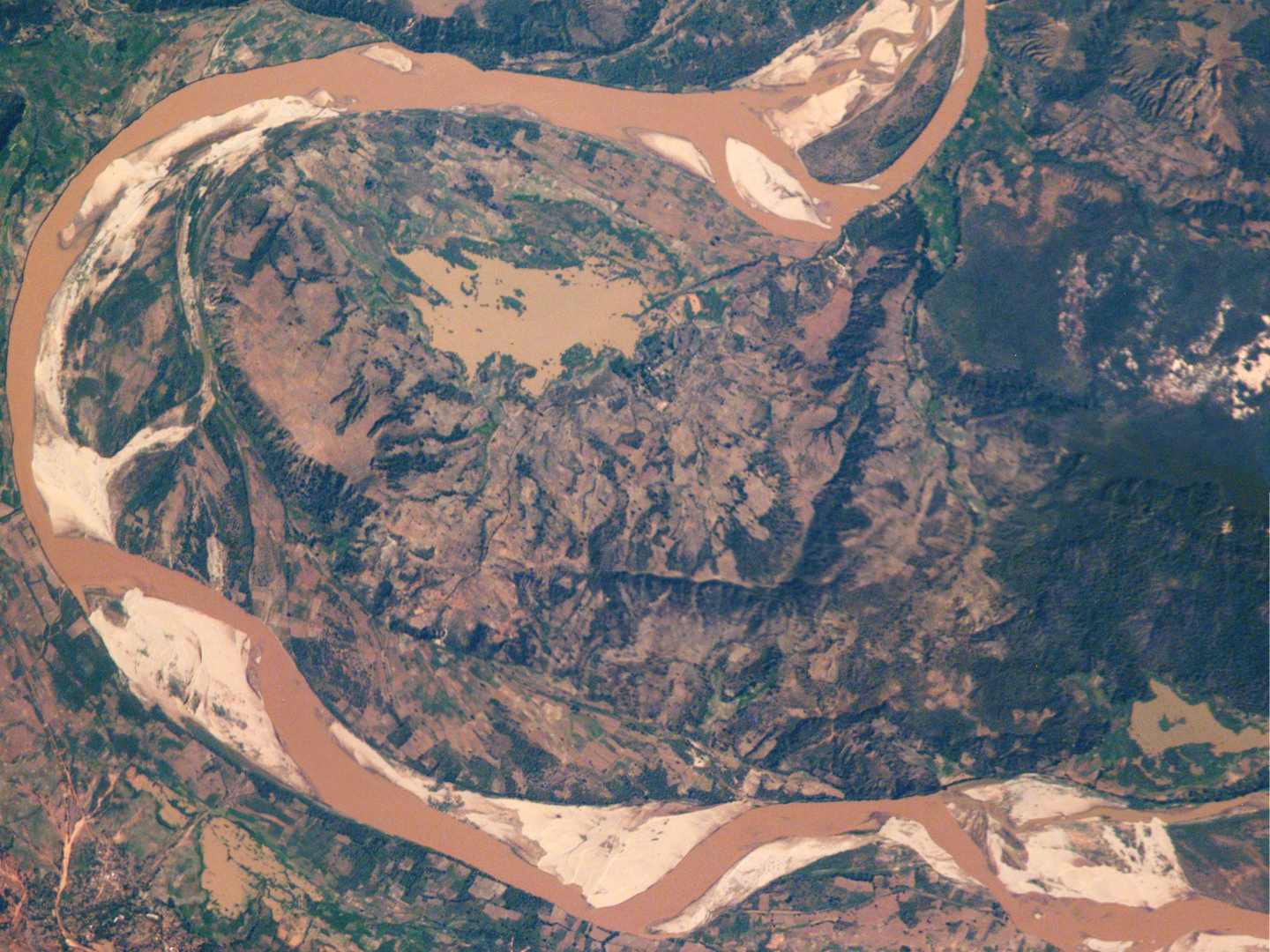
The Betsiboka River in normal conditions

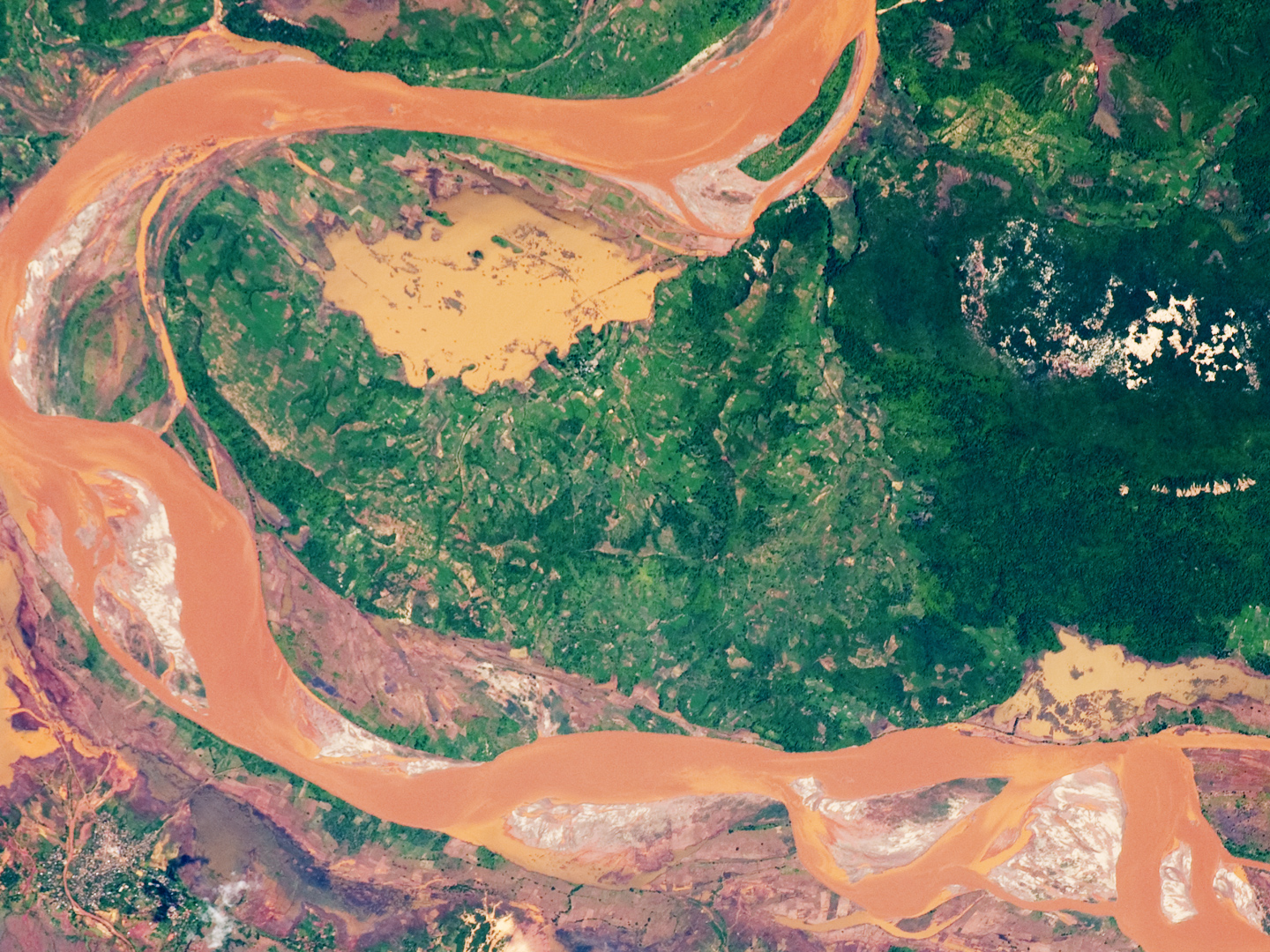
The Betsiboka River when flooded

== See also ==
- Betsiboka Bridge
