= Fauna of Madagascar =

Native animals of Madagascar

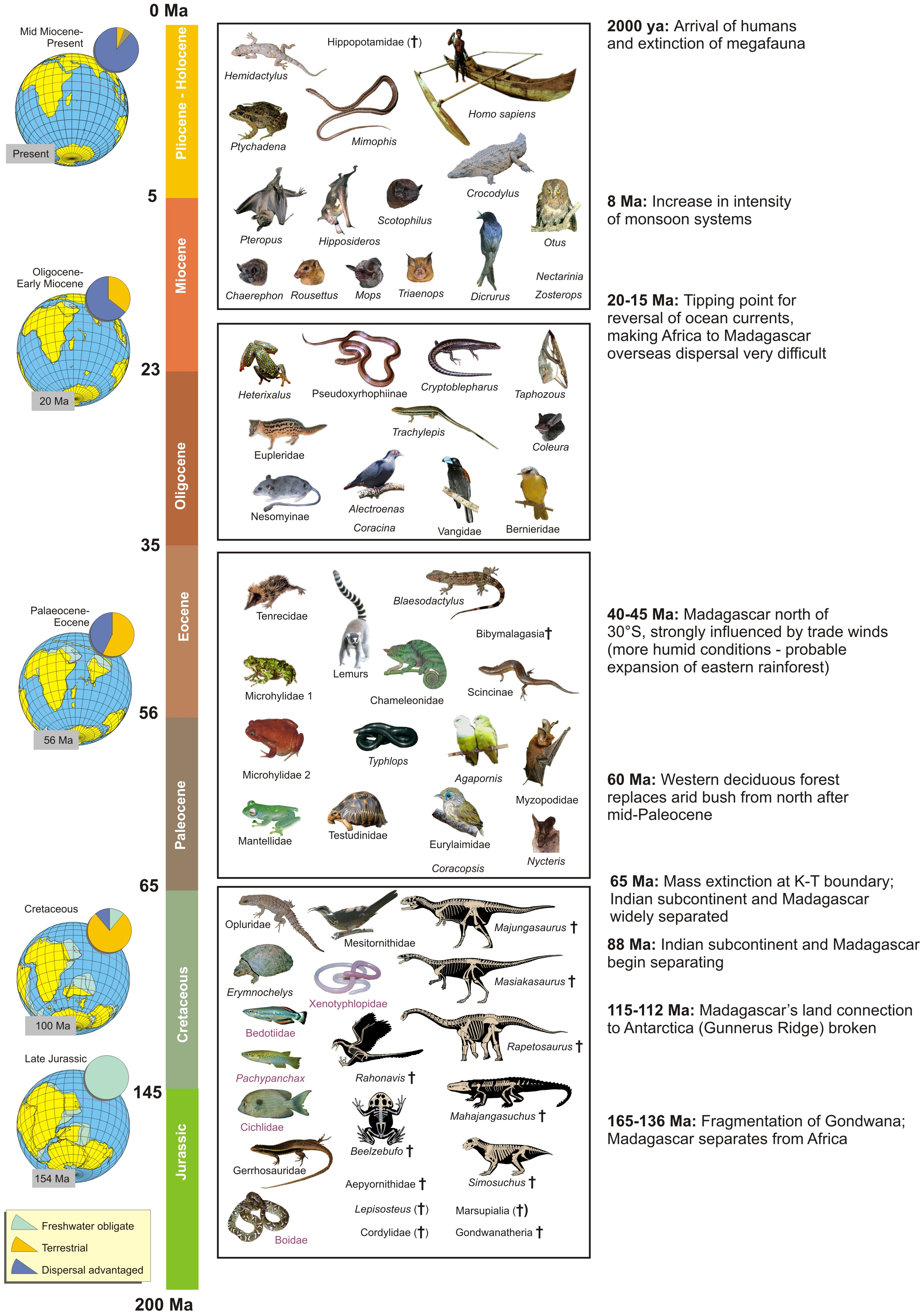
The history of the fauna of Madagascar in the context of plate tectonics and paleoclimate over the last 200 million years (Aepyornithidae arrived later than is indicated).

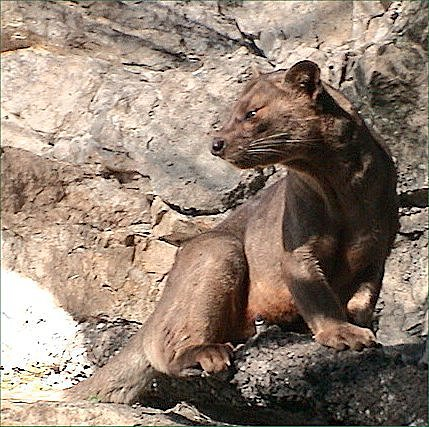
A good example of Malagasy convergent evolution is the fossa, a Malagasy carnivore that has evolved in appearance and behaviour to be so like a large cat that it was originally classified in Felidae, when it is in fact more closely related to the mongoose

The fauna of Madagascar is a part of the wildlife of Madagascar.

Madagascar has been an isolated island for about 70 million years, breaking away from Africa around 165 million years ago, then from India nearly 100 million years later. This isolation led to the development of a unique endemic fauna.

Before humans arrived about 2,000 years ago, there were many large and unusual animals living there, descended from species that were originally present when Madagascar became an island, or from species that later crossed the sea to Madagascar. Ecological niches were often filled by animals with quite different histories from those on the African mainland, often leading to convergent evolution. A large proportion of these endemic Malagasy animals have died out since the arrival of humans, most particularly the megafauna.

Despite this, and massive deforestation, Madagascar is still home to a diverse wildlife, the vast majority of which is unique in the world. Madagascar is a common destination for ecotourism, with more than fifty national parks and other protected reserves.

There are believed to have been only four colonization events of terrestrial mammals from mainland Africa. They brought to Madagascar the ancestors of its tenrecs, lemurs, carnivorans and nesomyine rodents. The other mammalian colonizations were those of the amphibious hippopotamuses (now extinct) and bats.

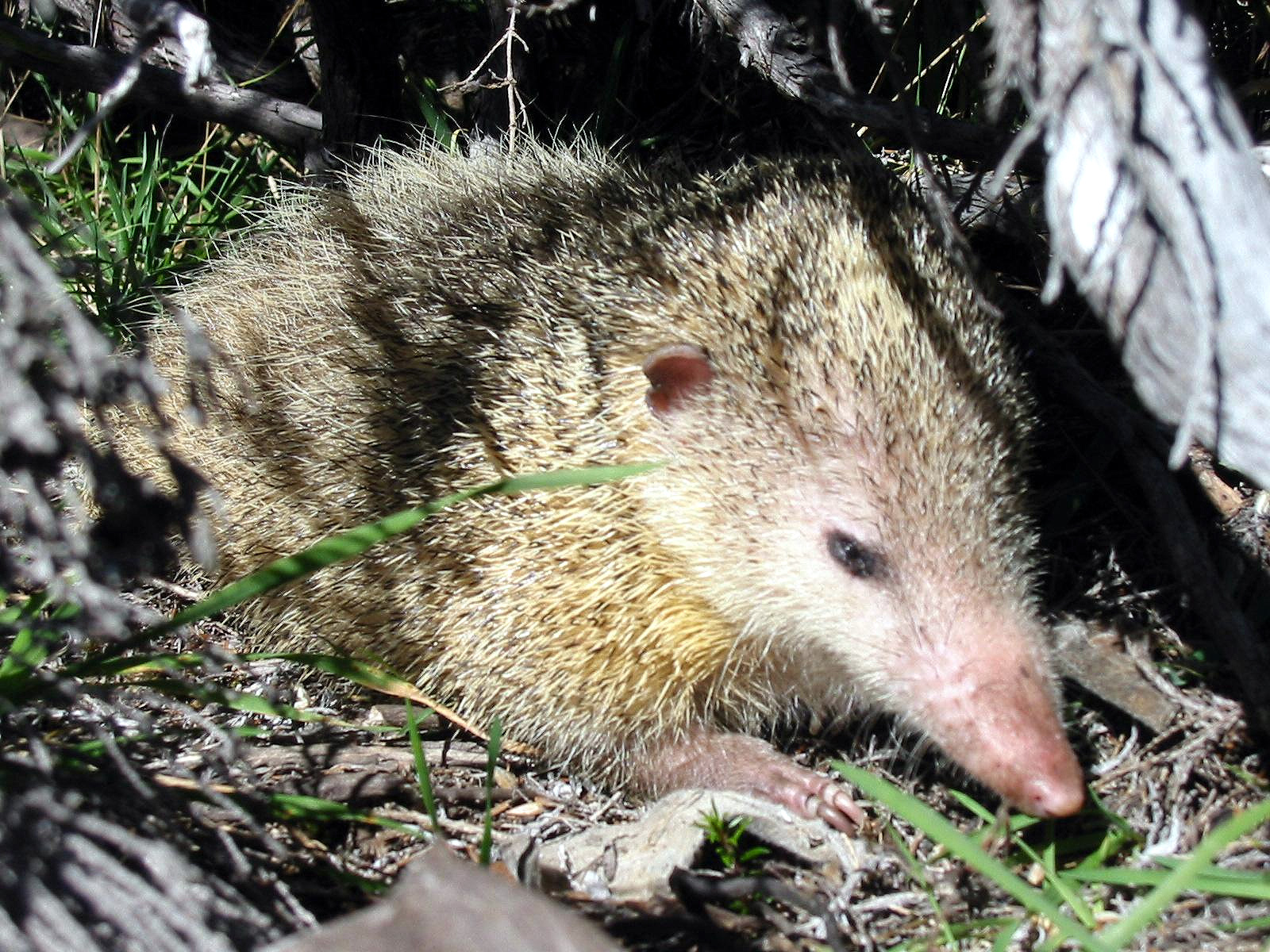
Tailless tenrec (Tenrec ecaudatus), the largest of the tenrecs.

== Mammals ==
The lemurs are the best known of Madagascar's mammals. They can be found only on Madagascar. In the absence of monkeys and other competitors, these primates have adapted to a wide range of habitats and diversified into numerous species. The tenrecs are another group of mammals characteristic of Madagascar. Most of the world's species of these small to medium-sized insectivores are found on the island. Rodents are poorly represented on the island with only a handful of native species, all belonging to the subfamily Nesomyinae. They include the large, endangered Malagasy giant rat. Due to their ability to fly, a greater variety of bats have reached the island. However, only about a third of these are endemic, a lower proportion than in other groups of land mammals. There are eight members of the Carnivora on the island, all now classified in the endemic family Eupleridae. The cat-like fossa is the largest of these.

=== Malagasy living mammals ===
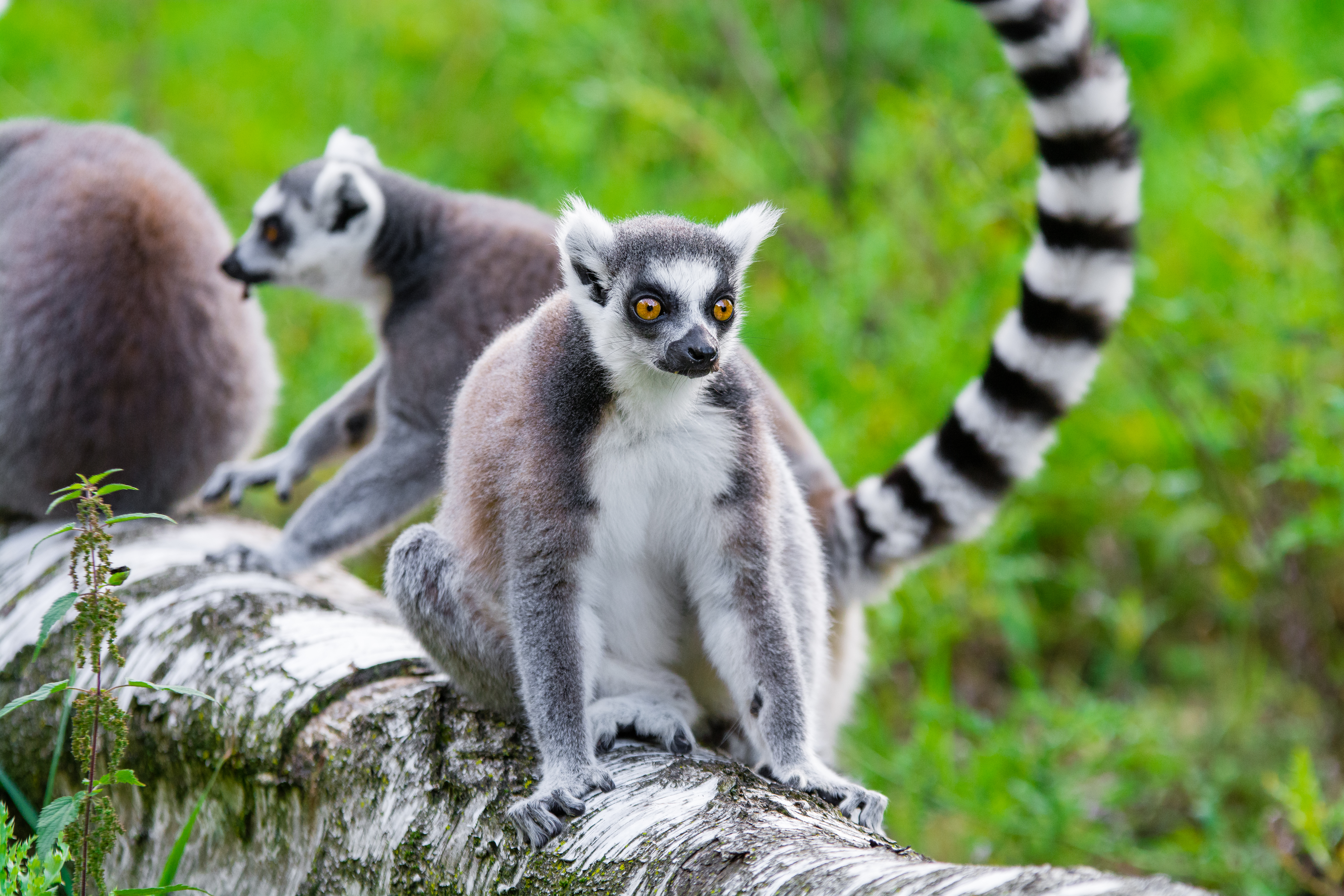
Ring-tailed lemur

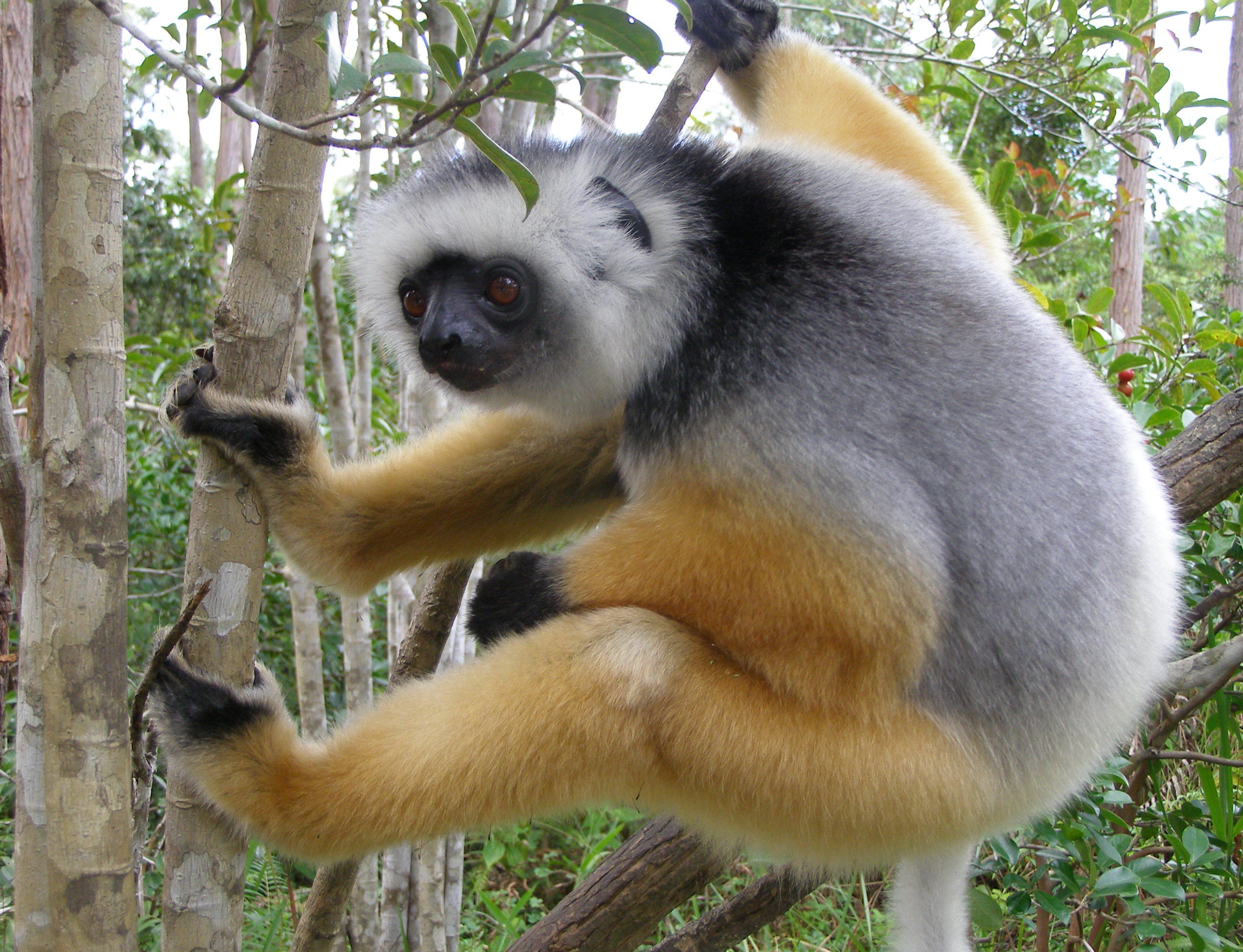
Diademed sifaka

Lemurs: As of 2008, there are officially 99 species and subspecies of lemur, 39 of which have been described by zoologists between 2000 and 2008. Of the 51 species that were evaluated by the IUCN that year, 43 were categorized as threatened to some degree, with six species being classified as "Critically Endangered", the designation of highest risk. The evaluations became considerably more pessimistic in 2012.

Eupleridae: Primary among these malagasy carnivores is the fossa (Cryptoprocta ferox), an animal similar in appearance to a feline. Other Malagasy carnivores include the fanaloka (Fossa fossana), which, despite its scientific name, should not be confused with the fossa. Nor should it be confused with the very similarly named falanouc (Eupleres goudotii), also known as the Malagasy small-toothed civet. Five species of mongoose are also found in Madagascar, as is the small Indian civet, one of the carnivores believed to have been introduced to the island.

Tenrecidae: Three species of tenrec (the otter shrews) are found on the African mainland. The majority of tenrecs, around 30 species, are found in Madagascar. They have radiated into many different niches. For example, web-footed tenrecs (Limnogale mergulus) resemble river otters in appearance and behaviour, while the lesser hedgehog tenrec (Echinops telfairi) resembles its namesake, the hedgehog.

Rodents: About 30 species of indigenous rodent are known from Madagascar, three of which are now extinct. They are all members of the muroid subfamily Nesomyinae. These have also radiated into various niches, with vole-like forms, arboreal mice, fossorial varieties, and rabbit-like forms.

Bats: Approximately 69 species of bat are known from Madagascar, more than half of which are endemic to the island (see List of bats of Madagascar).

=== Malagasy extinct mammals ===
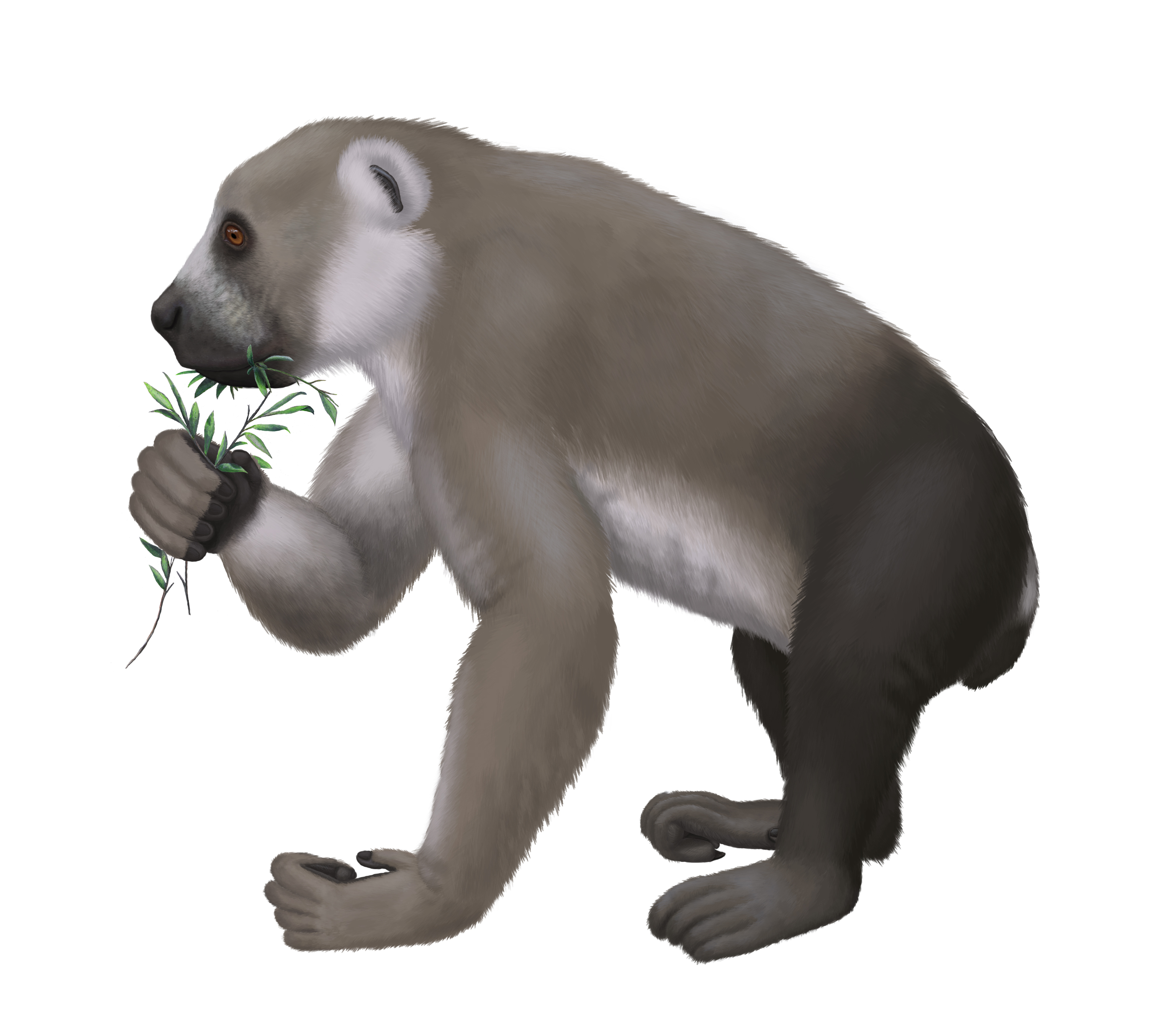
Archaeoindris fontoynontii is an extinct giant lemur, comparable in size to a male gorilla.

Plesiorycteropus (P. germainepetterae, P. madagascariensis): One or two species of mysterious aardvark-like tenrec relatives that may have gone extinct about 1000 years ago.

Giant lemurs: At least 17 species of lemur have become extinct since man arrived on Madagascar, all of which were larger than the surviving lemur species. They include the giant aye-aye, three to five times as heavy as the extant species; Megaladapis, which had three species and reached the size of orangutans; eight sloth lemurs species, which show evolutionary convergence with the South American sloths; Palaeopropithecus, which was chimpanzee-sized; and Archaeoindris, which grew to over 200 kg (440 lb), bigger than a silverback gorilla.

Giant fossa (Cryptoprocta spelea): The fossil record of Madagascar has yielded the remains of a recently extinct fossa, which was about a quarter larger than the living species, making it close to the size of an ocelot. This species was believed to have preyed upon the larger lemurs that inhabited Madagascar until the island was settled by man.

Malagasy hippopotamuses: There are thought to have been three species of dwarf or pygmy hippopotamus in Madagascar, the last of which died out no earlier than 1,000 years ago, probably as a result of human settlement of the island.

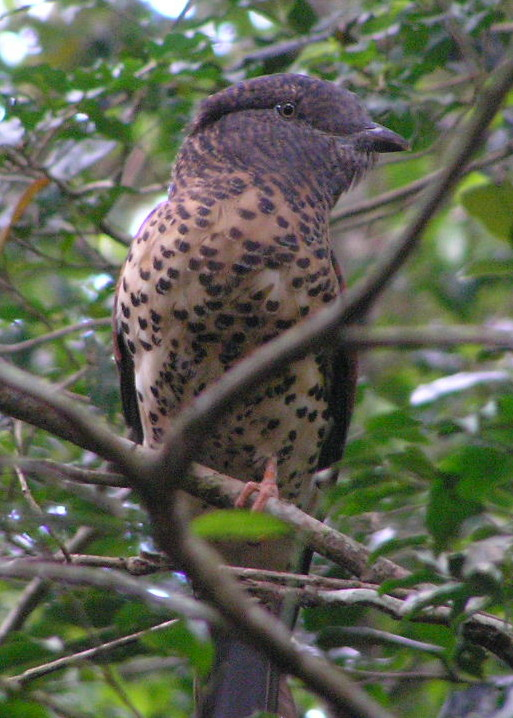
Cuckoo-roller (Leptosomus discolor), the only member of a family unique to Madagascar and the nearby Comoros.

== Birds ==
About 280 species of bird have been recorded on Madagascar and about 200 of these breed on the island. Although these are relatively low numbers for a large tropical island, there is a high degree of endemism. Over 100 bird species are endemic, and 49 of these are restricted-range endemics, with a range of less than 50,000 km^{2} (19,000 sq mi). There are five bird families unique to Madagascar or shared only with the Comoro Islands: the mesites, the ground-rollers, the cuckoo-roller, the asities and the vangas. In addition, recent studies suggest that several songbirds should be grouped together in a new endemic family: the Malagasy warblers.

Elephant birds (e.g. Aepyornis maximus) were flightless ratites up to over 3 m (9.8 ft) tall and 275–1,000 kg (610–2,200 lb) in weight. Genetic studies have revealed that their closest living relatives are the kiwi of New Zealand, rather than the nearby ostriches of Africa; this implies that their presence on the island may be due to long-range dispersal rather than vicariance. They are thought to have become extinct within the last millennium, as a result of human activity. Other endemic birds that have disappeared since human settlement of the island include the Malagasy lapwing and Malagasy shelduck.

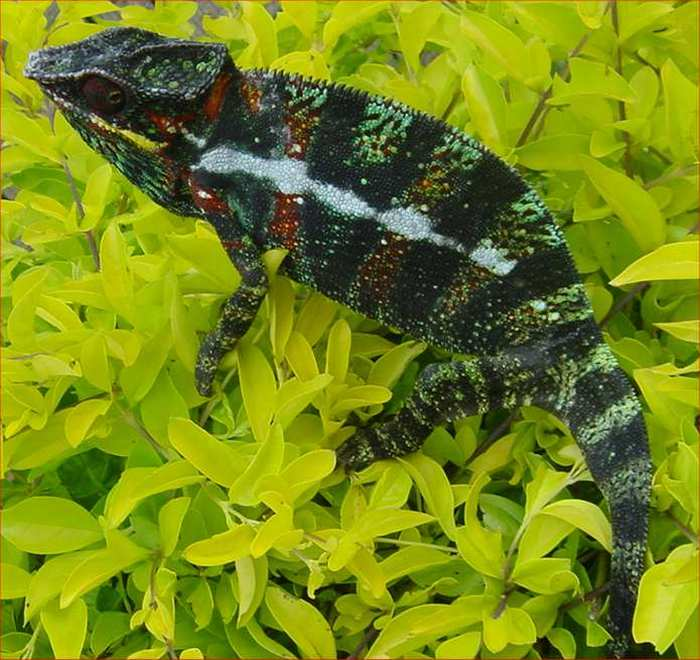
Panther chameleon (Furcifer pardalis), a large chameleon which has adapted to man-made habitats.

== Reptiles ==
Relatively few families and genera of reptile have reached Madagascar, but they have diversified into more than 260 species, with over 90% of these being endemic. The chameleons are very well represented, with two-thirds of the world's species found there. The other lizard groups on Madagascar are the geckoes, skinks, girdle-tailed lizards and iguanids. Over 60 different snakes occur on the island; none of these are harmful to man. There are six land tortoises species, five endemics and one introduced species (Bell's hinge-back tortoise). Land based turtles include the African helmeted turtle, yellow-bellied mud turtle and East African black mud turtle. The shores are used for nesting by the loggerhead sea turtle, green sea turtle and hawksbill sea turtle while the olive ridley sea turtle forages here. Madagascar's largest reptile is the Nile crocodile, which has become very rare due to hunting for its skin. The endemic voay (V. robustus) has become extinct.

Madagascar is a stronghold for a wide diversity of endemic species of chameleons and is considered the radiation point for day geckos. The two genera of iguanas present have a basal relationship to other iguanas and are believed to have been present on the island since it separated from Africa. The Madagascar big-headed turtle, spider tortoise, flat-backed spider tortoise, radiated tortoise and ploughshare tortoise are endangered species.

- Chameleon genera found in Madagascar: Calumma, Furcifer and Brookesia
- Iguanian (or iguanid) lizard genera of Madagascar: Chalarodon and Oplurus

== Amphibians ==
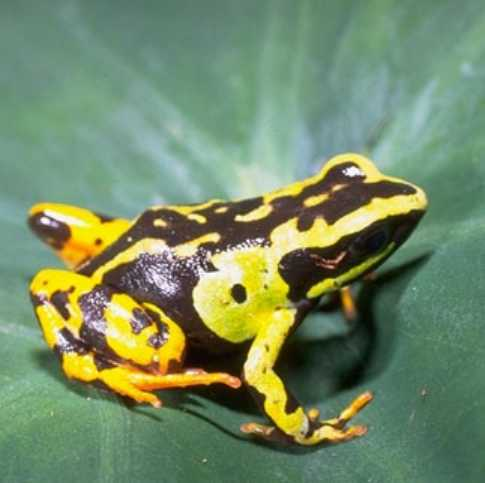
Mantella frogs have bright warning colours and are sometimes confused with the unrelated poison dart frogs of the Americas.

There are more than 400 amphibian species in Madagascar with new species being found regularly. Nearly all of these are endemic and the majority are restricted to primary forest. Examples of well-known amphibian species found in Madagascar include tomato frog and golden mantella frog.

== Freshwater fish ==
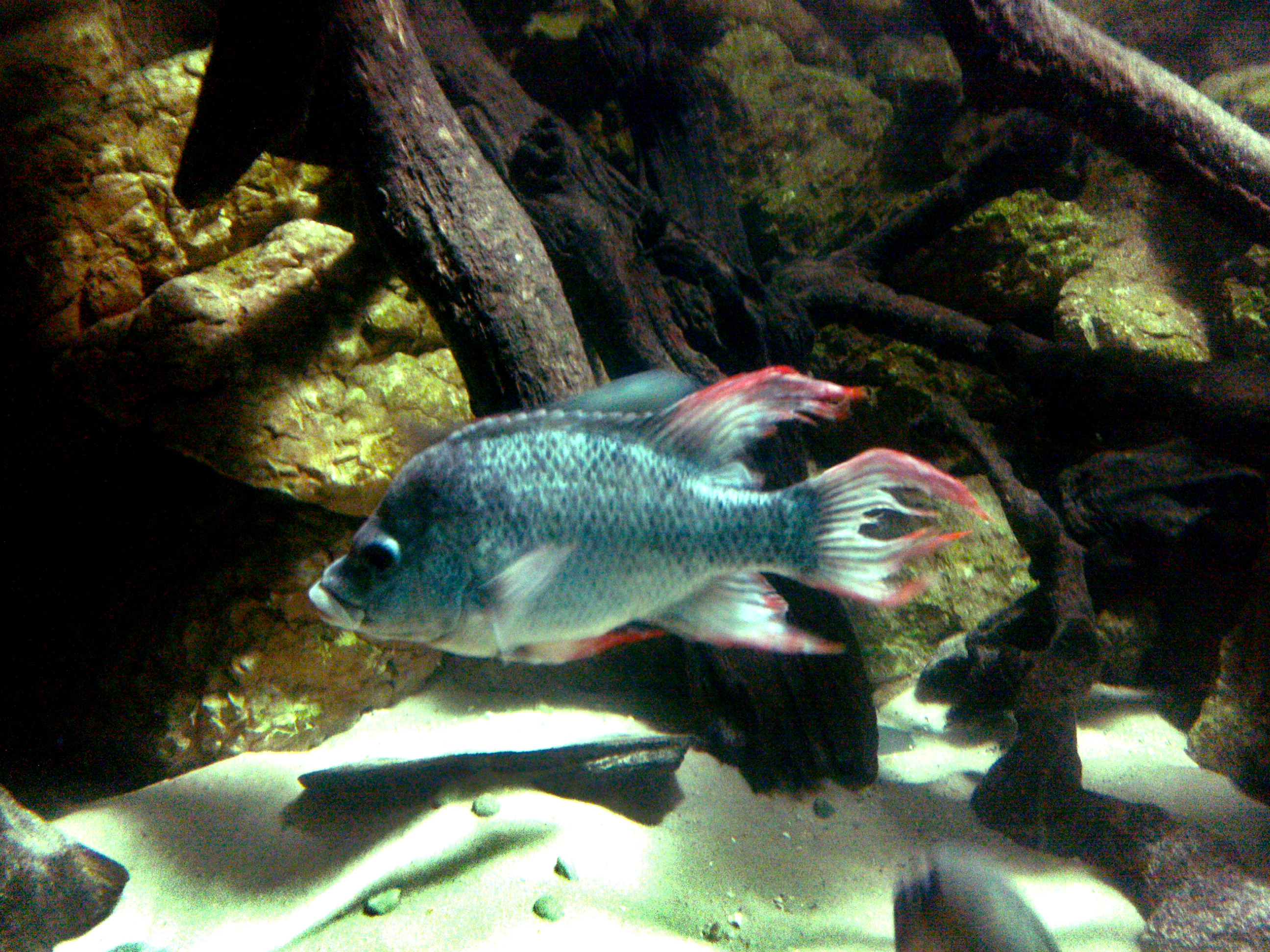
The cichlid Ptychochromis insolitus was feared extinct in the wild (with only males in captivity) until rediscovered in 2013.

Madagascar has a rich freshwater fish fauna with a very high rate of endemics. The full diversity is unclear, as new species are being described regularly, and species may have disappeared before even being discovered; estimates suggest the island has between 135 and 150 native fish species that are restricted to freshwater, a number that grows significantly if one includes the widespread euryhaline species. Among these are two families entirely restricted to Madagascar: the anchariid catfish and the Madagascar rainbowfish. Additionally, several genera are endemic to Madagascar, including cichlids (Katria, Oxylapia, Paratilapia, Paretroplus, Ptychochromis and Ptychochromoides), round herrings (Sauvagella and Spratellomorpha), Old World silverside (Teramulus), sleeper gobies (Ratsirakia and the troglobitic Typhleotris), and aplocheilid killifish (Pachypanchax, which is, strictly speaking, near-endemic, as there is a single species from the Seychelles). There are endemic species from other genera (notably Ambassis, Arius, Eleotris, Glossogobius, Kuhlia, Mesopristes, Ophiocara, Pantanodon and Sicyopterus), but these also have other species found elsewhere.

The geographic history of Madagascar (long isolated, but part of Gondwana) has resulted in unusual biogeographic patterns, comparable to those seen in other animal and plant groups of the island. For example, the closest relatives of the Madagascar rainbowfish are the "true" rainbowfish of New Guinea and Australia, while the killifish Pachypanchax and the cichlids Paretroplus have their closest relatives in South Asia.

The freshwater fish fauna in Madagascar has declined drastically due to habitat loss, due to pollution and siltation following deforestation, damming, overfishing and introduced species (such as tilapia, Nile perch, African arowana, blotched snakehead, green swordtail and many other), with some suggesting that only a remnant of the natives can be saved. Among species already believed to be extinct are Pantanodon madagascariensis and Ptychochromis onilahy.

== Invertebrates ==
=== Oligochaeta ===
Thirty-eight species of earthworms are recorded in seven families: the Megascolecidae, Kynotidae (giant earthworms; endemic family with a single genus), Acanthodrilidae, Eudrilidae, Ocneodrilidae, Octochaetidae and Glossoscolecidae. Among the species reported, 59% are endemic.

=== Insects ===
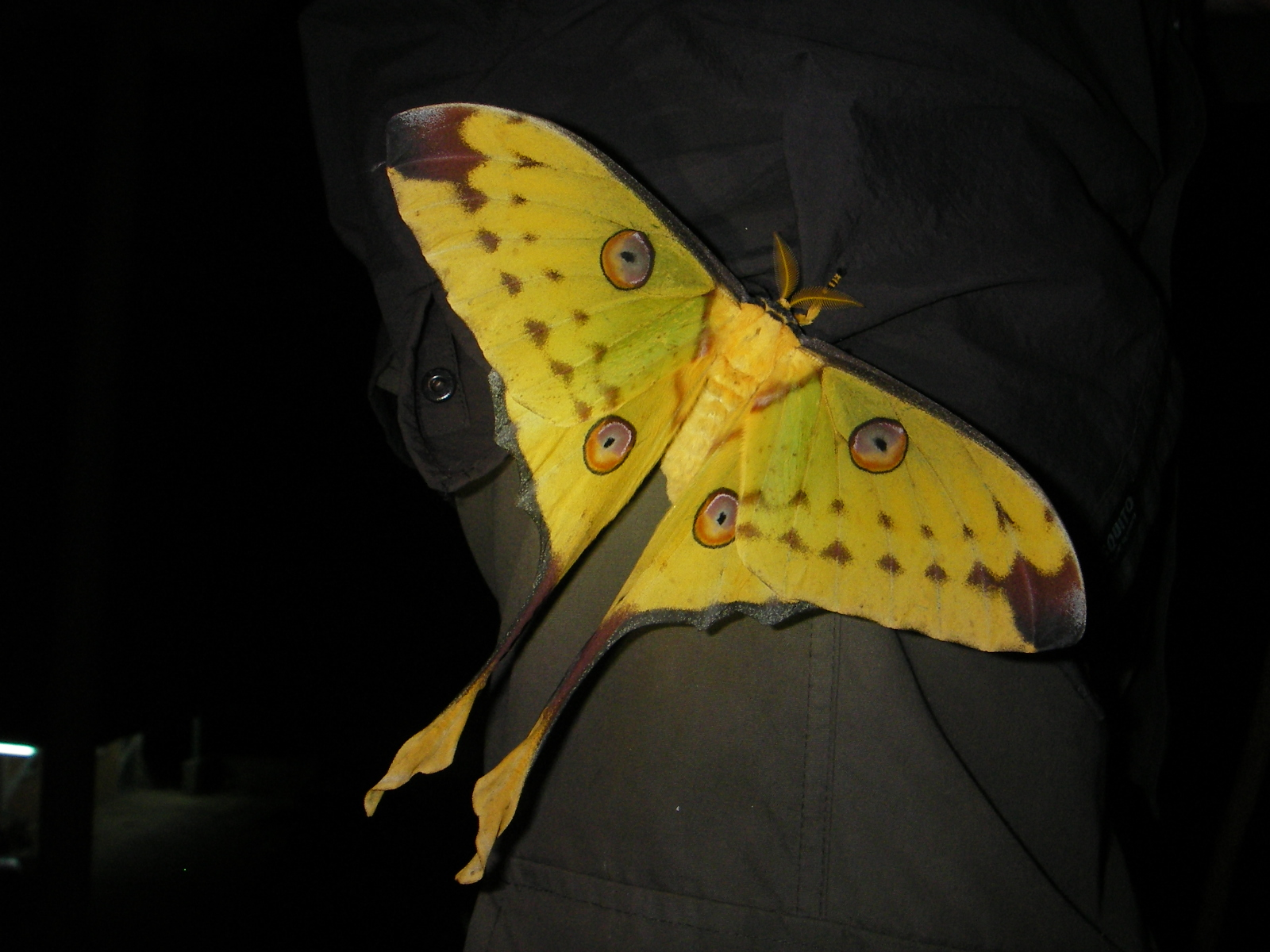
Comet moth (Argema mittrei), one of the world's largest moths.

Madagascar is home to huge variety of insects, the majority of which are endemic. Thousands of species are present in some groups, such as the beetles and moths. There are approximately 100,000 species of insects and counting in Madagascar. Distinctive species include the long-necked giraffe weevil, the huge comet moth and the butterfly-like Madagascan sunset moth. About 80 species of stick insect occur; the Achrioptera species are large and colourful while others are small and very well-camouflaged. Many of the island's praying mantises are also well-camouflaged, mimicking dead leaves or bark. There are over 100 cockroaches, including the large hissing cockroaches.

The mosquitoes of Madagascar include 235 species, among which 138 (59%) are endemic and 64 (27%) have a known medical or veterinary interest because they can transmit diseases.

Various species of beetles call Madagascar home, such as tiger beetles (Cicindelidae): 109 species from genus Pogonostoma, and 65 species from genus Physodeutera.

Madagascar is home to the smallest bee in the World, Liotrigona bitika (Brooks & Michener 1988), which has a body length of less than 2 mm, as well as several other species of Meliponini.

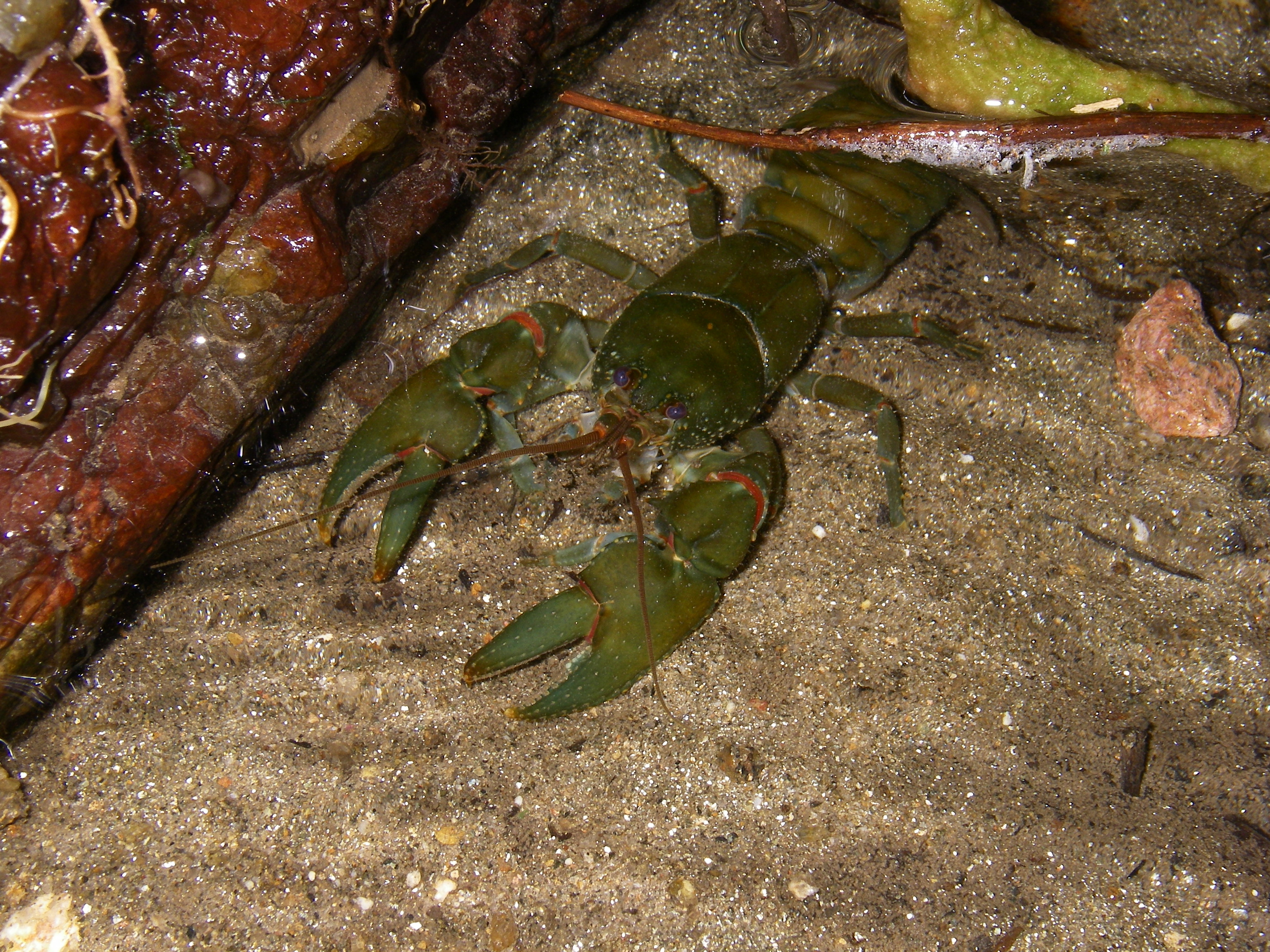
The freshwater crayfish Astacoides appears to be a Gondwanan relict.

=== Spiders ===
Darwin's bark spider was discovered in 2009. It is famous for making the strongest and largest spider webs (ranging from 900 – 28000 square centimetres). The silk produced by this spider is twice as strong as other common spider silk.

=== Freshwater crustaceans ===
Madagascar is home to several endemic freshwater crustaceans, including 17 species of potamonautid crabs (Boreas, Foza, Hydrothelphusa, Madagapotamon, Malagasya, Marojejy and Skelosophusa), 7 species of parastacid crayfish (Astacoides), and atyid shrimp.

== Marine life ==
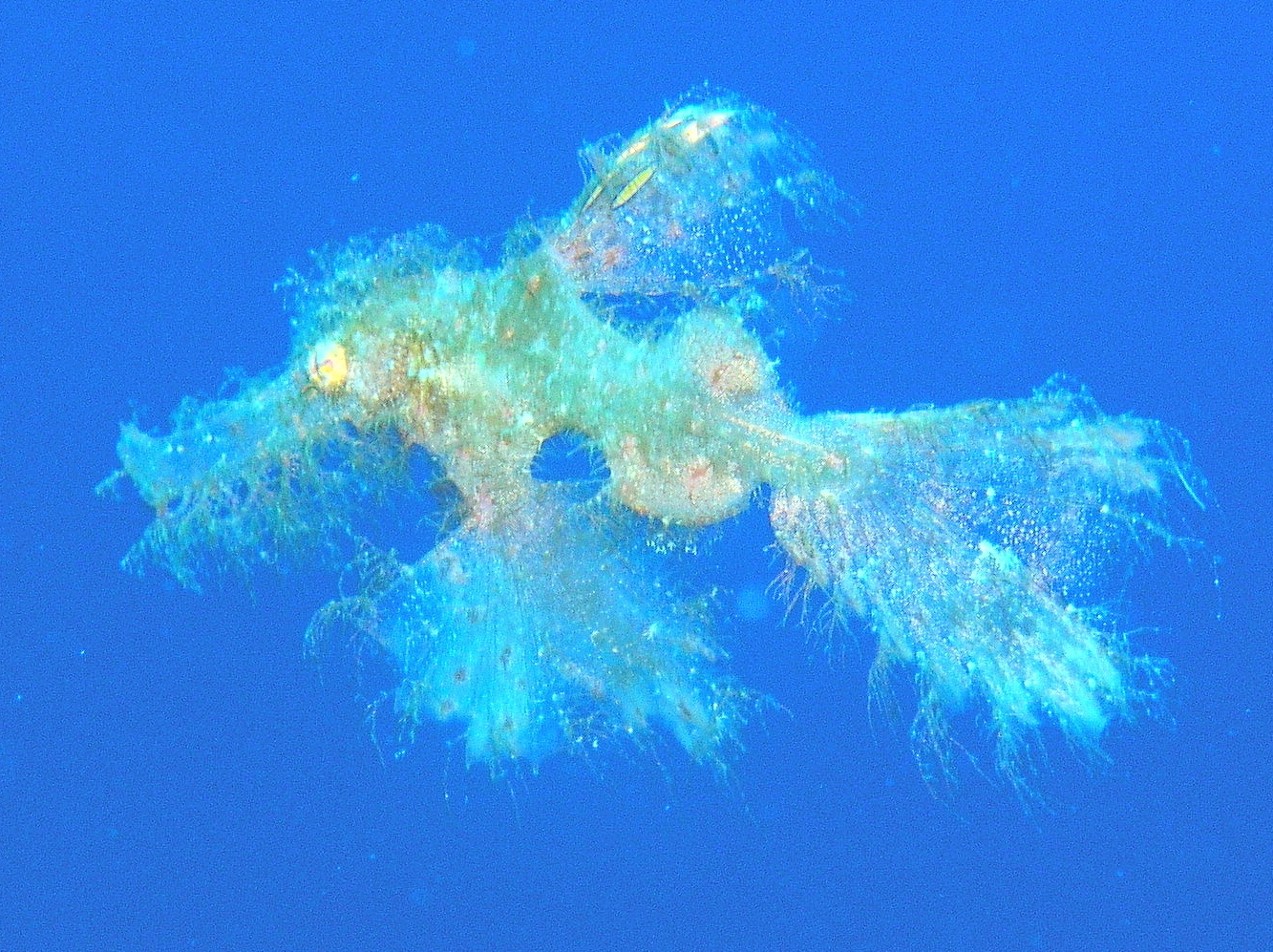
Robust ghostpipefish (Solenostomus cyanopterus) off Nosy Be.

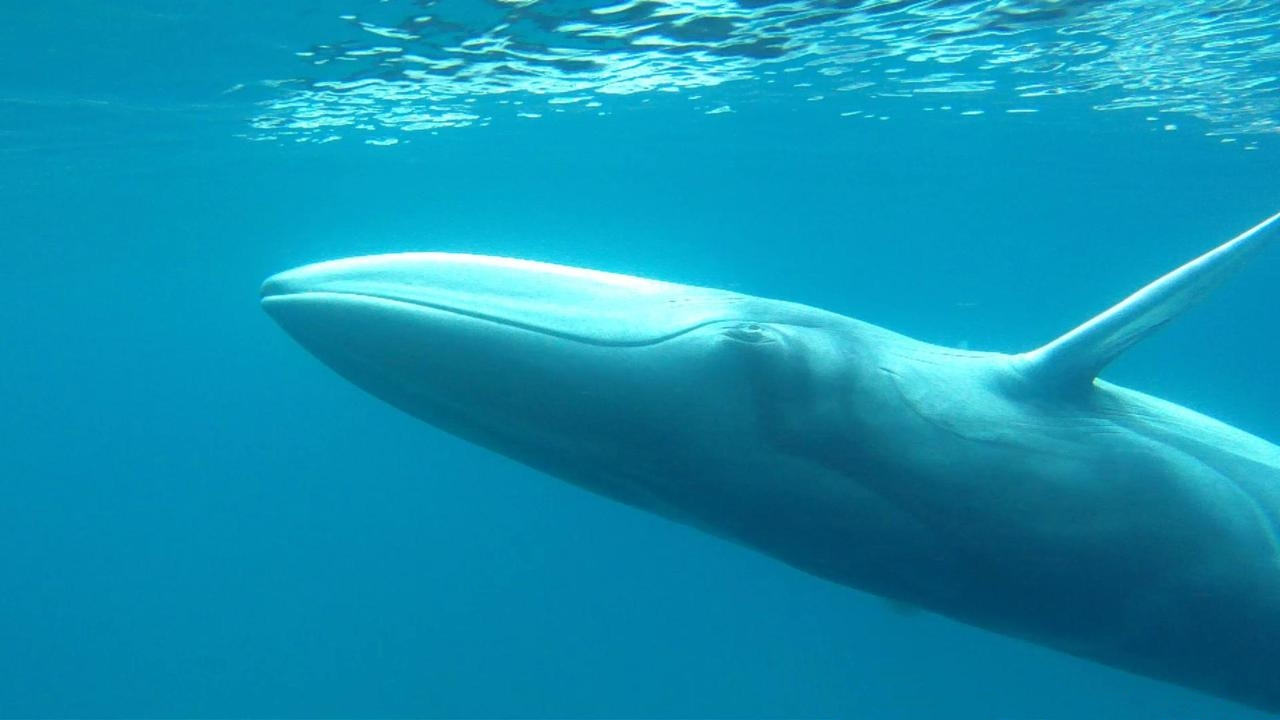
Omura's whale off Nosy Be.

The seas around Madagascar host a high diversity of wildlife, including invertebrates. There is a still a large area of mangrove swamp around the coast, particularly in the west, and there are extensive coral reefs around the island. Thousands of fish species occur, including the rare coelacanth. Four species of sea turtle breed on the beaches, but many are taken for food by local people. Multiple whales inhabit the seas near Madagascar: humpback whales breed off the south-western coasts such as at Île Sainte-Marie, Omura's whales occur around Nosy Be, pygmy blue whales occur on the Madagascar Plateau, and the population of southern right whales is slowly increasing along Malagasy coasts.

== Malagasy faunal names ==
=== Fish ===
Selected Malagasy fish names include:

- gogo: Arius spp.
- mahalogy: Caesio spp.
- tsenaby: Cheilio inermis
- lemeleme: Coris formosa
- lanora: Elagatis bipinnulata
- alovo: Epinephelus fasciatus, Epinephelus coeruleopunctatus
- angoa, vohy: Euthynnus affinis
- tserakantsiva: Fistularia petimba
- ambariake: Gerres oyena
- soavahindriaka: Hippocampus cf. borboniensis
- ndwaro: Istiophorus platypterus
- fiambondis (?): Labroides dimidiatus
- tapaporoha: Lethrinus harak
- ambitsy: Lethrinus nebulosus
- romanjia: Lethrinus variegatus
- tsivaravana: Lutjanus bohar
- amposama: Lutjanus fulviflamma
- fiamasika: Lutjanus kasmira
- ndwaro: Makaira indica
- kipela, talatala: Monodactylus argenteus
- amgelika: Monotaxis grandoculis
- dangiara, filao papango: Platax orbicularis
- fiandolo, lafalovo: Plotosus lineatus
- bodoloha: Pseudanthias squamipinnis
- lemilemy: Pseudochromis dutoiti
- sabonto: Rastrelliger kanagurta
- soroboa: Rhynchobatus djiddensis
- maro taobana: Sardinella albella
- lamatra, talafeta: Scomberomorus commerson
- lamatra: Scomberomorus plurilineatus
- akihoviko: Sphyrna spp.
- drihy, tsarabora: Terapon jarbua
- lemeleme: Thalassoma hebraicum
- sampramale, vivano: Variola louti
- fiam'akoho: Zanclus cornutus

=== Extinct megafauna ===
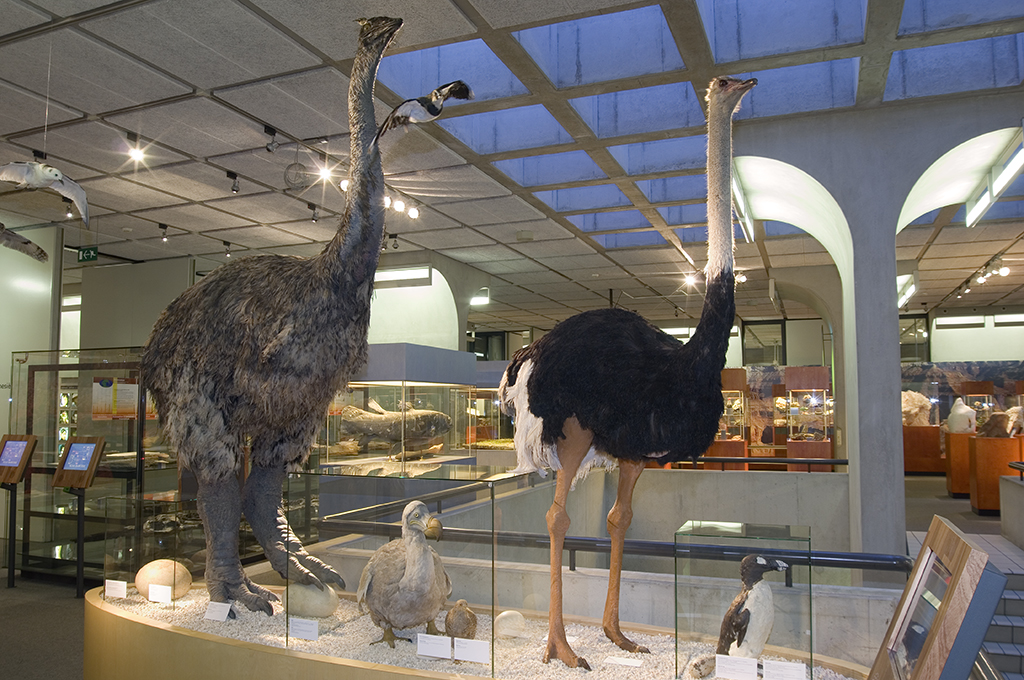
Madagascar's Elephant bird and ostrich

Birds

- Vorompatra: Aepyornis

Lemurs

- Tratratratra, tretretretre: probably Palaeopropithecus (a type of sloth lemur)
- Tokandia: probably Megaladapis (koala lemur)
- Kidoky: Hadropithecus or Archaeolemur (monkey lemurs, baboon lemurs)

Others

- Kilopilopitsofy, tsomgomby, railalomena: Malagasy hippopotamus
- Antamba: Cryptoprocta spelea or similar

== Habitat loss ==
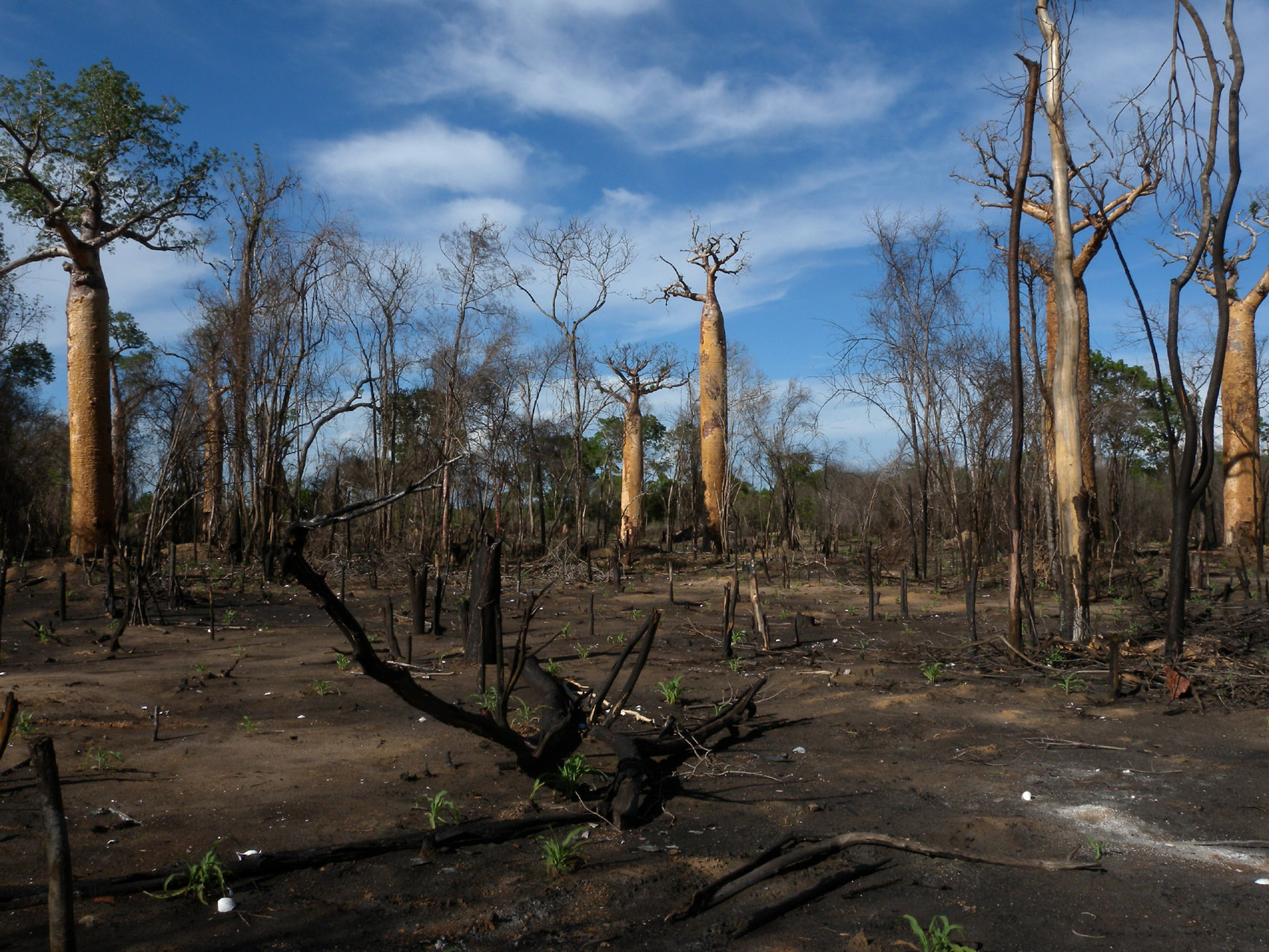
Lemurs in Madagascar's dry deciduous forests are threatened by deforestation for the creation of farmland and pasture.

Most of Madagascar's habitats are in danger; they are being threatened by today's demands and growing needs. Environmental damage has been especially severe for humid forests. Fauna and Flora International, abbreviated as FFI, is one of the organizations that supports Madagascar's habitats.

== In popular culture ==
- As a part of conservation efforts, the Wildlife Conservation Society has recently opened a Madagascar! exhibit at the Bronx Zoo.
- The 2005 animated film Madagascar featured a number of animals of Madagascar as cartoon characters. There was, however, a scene that showed a hummingbird in the titular location, although hummingbirds aren't found in Madagascar.
  - The prequel TV series All Hail King Julien continues this trend, though made exceptions with the characters Xixi and Doctor S, who are a toucan and cobra respectively, species not found in the country, and one episode included a wildebeest. The giant scorpion Fred might also be an exception, as even the largest scorpions on the island don't come close to his size, but the prehistoric Pulmonoscorpius does, though this one never lived in Madagascar.

== See also ==
- Madagascar Fauna Group
- List of mammals of Madagascar
- Wildlife of Madagascar
