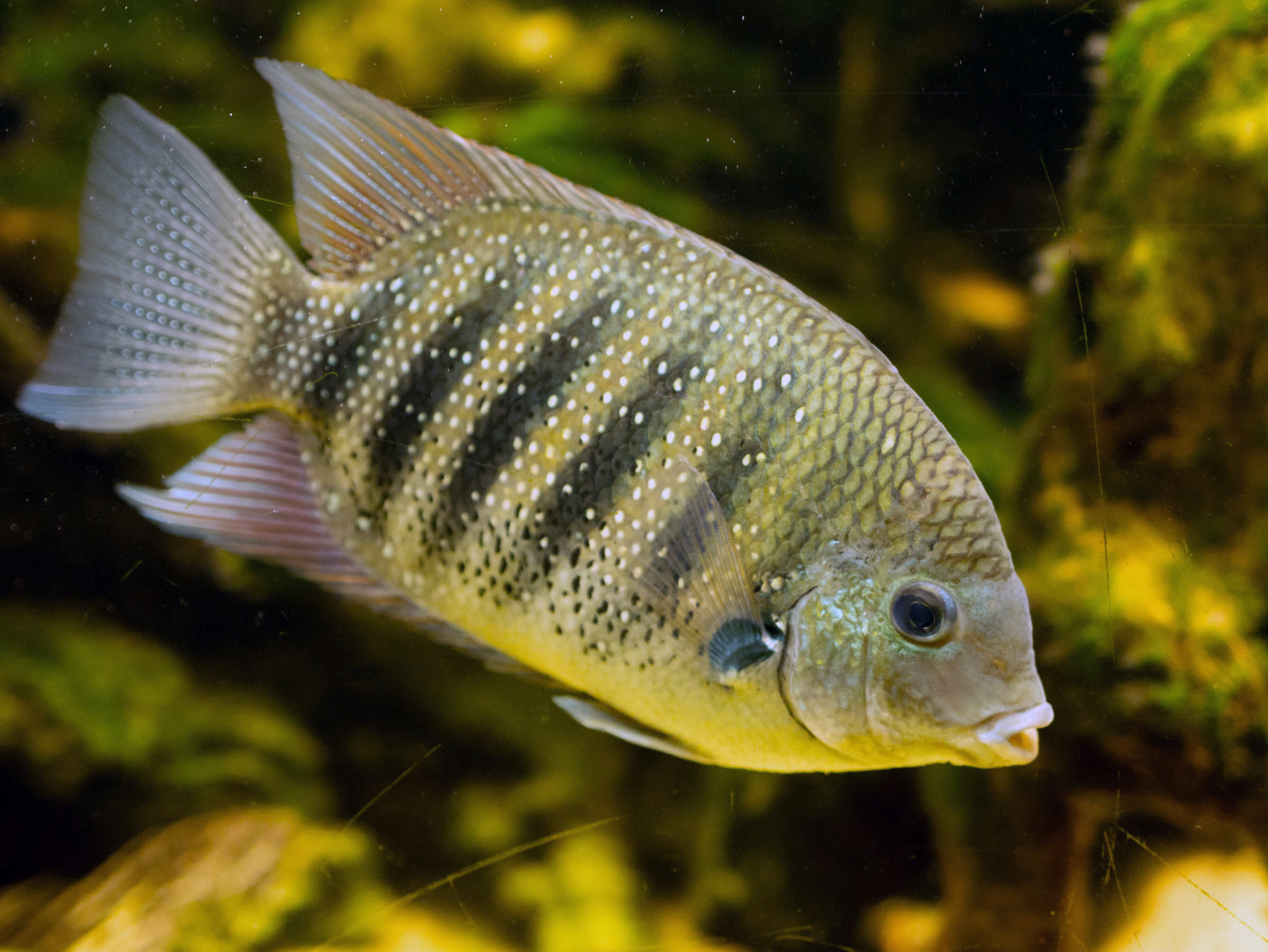
- Etroplus suratensis

Scientific classification
- Kingdom: Animalia
- Phylum: Chordata
- Class: Actinopterygii
- Order: Cichliformes
- Family: Cichlidae
- Subfamily: Etroplinae
- Genus: Etroplus; G. Cuvier, 1830

Type species
- Etroplus meleagris G. Cuvier, 1830

= Etroplus =

Genus of fishes

Etroplus is a small genus of cichlids native to southern India and Sri Lanka. Together with Pseudetroplus (which formerly was included in Etroplus), they are the only cichlids of this region.

Their closest living relatives are Paretroplus from Madagascar. These two lineages must have separated during the Mesozoic already, as Madagascar and the Indian Plate had separated by the end of the Cretaceous.

== Species ==
There are currently two recognized species in this genus. The former third species, the orange chromide, was moved to Pseudetroplus in 2014.

- Etroplus canarensis (F. Day, 1877) (Canara pearlspot)
- Etroplus suratensis (Bloch, 1790) (Green chromide)
