= Todisaina Raymond Ramarolahy =

Malagasy politician

Todisaina Raymond Ramarolahy is a Malagasy politician. A member of the National Assembly of Madagascar, he was elected as a member of the Tiako I Madagasikara party; he represents the constituency of Marolambo.
