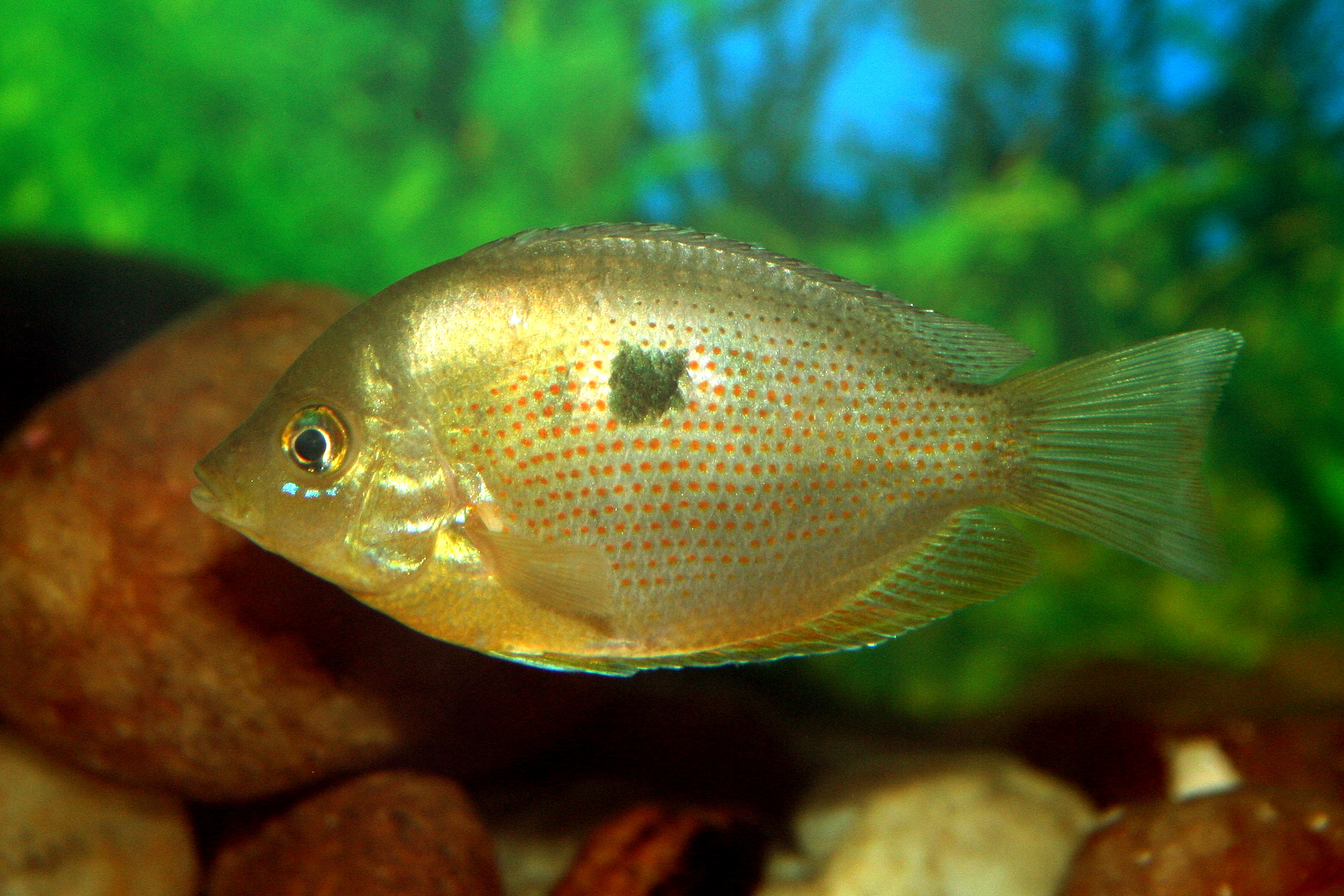
- Pseudetroplus maculatus

Scientific classification
- Kingdom: Animalia
- Phylum: Chordata
- Class: Actinopterygii
- Order: Cichliformes
- Family: Cichlidae
- Subfamily: Etroplinae; Van Couvering, 1982

Genera
- Etroplus; Paretroplus; Pseudetroplus

= Etroplinae =

Subfamily of fishes

Etroplinae is a subfamily in the cichlid family of fishes. The subfamily includes 3 genera (and about 16 species) : Etroplus and Pseudetroplus, which are the only cichlids native to India and Sri Lanka, and Paretroplus from Madagascar (other genera native to this island are in the subfamilies Paratilapiinae and Ptychochrominae).
