= Nosivolo River =

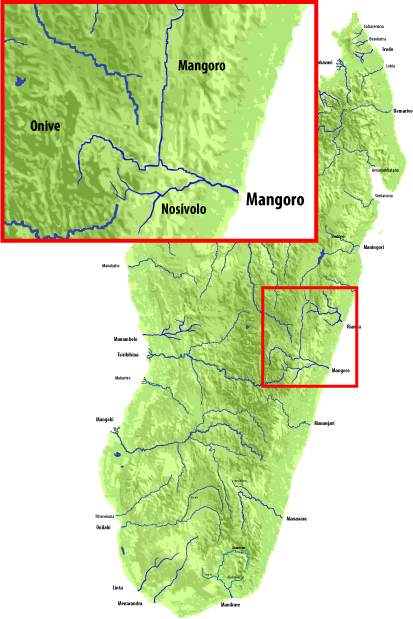

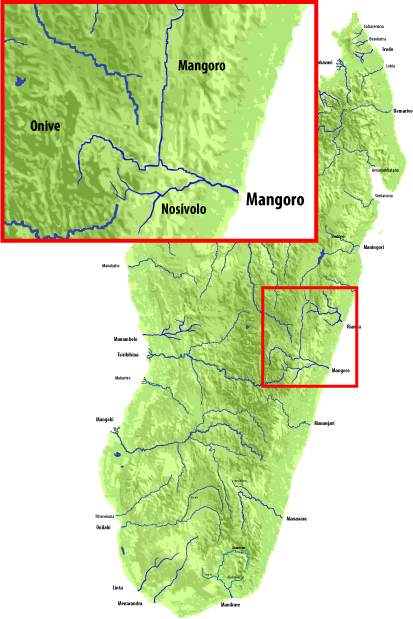
- Nosivolo River

Location
- Country: Madagascar

Physical characteristics
- Source
  - elevation: 1,800 m (5,900 ft)
- Mouth
  - location: Mangoro River
  - coordinates: 19°55′41.552″S 48°30′6.566″E
  - elevation: 700 m (2,300 ft)
- Length: 130 km (81 mi)
- Basin size: 3,585 km^{2} (1,384 sq mi)

the Nosivolo river in the Mangoro bassin

Designations

Ramsar Wetland
- Official name: Rivière Nosivolo et affluents
- Designated: 17 September 2010
- Reference no.: 1916

The Nosivolo River is a river in eastern Madagascar and a primary tributary of the Mangoro River. It begins east of Fandriana. The village of Marolambo, capital of the Marolambo District in the Atsinanana region, is located along the river at the junction with the Sandranamby River.

It is an important river in Madagascar due to its biodiversity (including the cichlids Katria katria and Oxylapia polli, and Malagasy rainbowfish), which has spurred efforts to protect it. It was designed the first river Ramsar site in the country in 2010.

The primary tributaries of the Nosivolo are the Sandranamby River (which joins near Marolambo), Sahadinta, Manandriana, and Sahanao.
