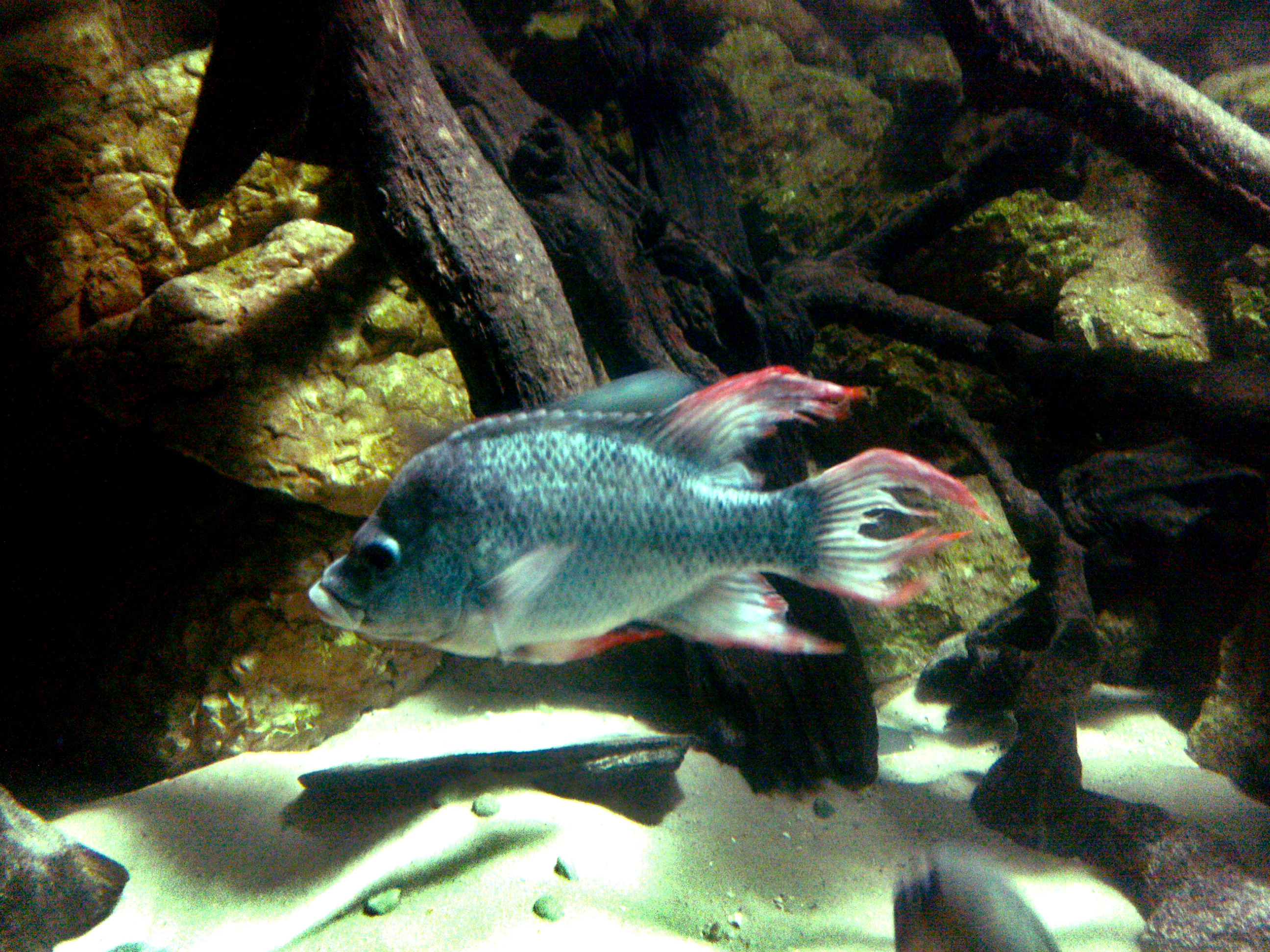
- Ptychochromis insolitus

Scientific classification
- Kingdom: Animalia
- Phylum: Chordata
- Class: Actinopterygii
- Division: Teleostei
- Order: Cichliformes
- Family: Cichlidae
- Subfamily: Ptychochrominae; Sparks, 2004

Genera
- See text

= Ptychochrominae =

Subfamily of fishes

The Ptychochrominae are a subfamily in the cichlid family of fish. It includes about 14 species. They are restricted to lakes and rivers in Madagascar, and the majority are threatened. Most cichlid genera native to Madagascar are included in this subfamily; the only exceptions are Paretroplus (subfamily Etroplinae) and Paratilapia (sometimes included in the Ptychochrominae, but likely belongs in its own subfamily).

== Genera ==
The following genera are included in the subfamily Ptychochrominae:

- Katria Stiassny & Sparks, 2006
- Oxylapia Kiener & Maugé, 1966
- Paratilapia Bleeker, 1868
- Ptychochromis Steindachner, 1880
- Ptychochromoides Kiener & Maugé, 1966
