= Ptychochromoides vondrozo =

Conservation status
- Endangered (IUCN 3.1)

Scientific classification
- Kingdom: Animalia
- Phylum: Chordata
- Class: Actinopterygii
- Order: Cichliformes
- Family: Cichlidae
- Genus: Ptychochromoides
- Species: P. vondrozo

Binomial name
- Ptychochromoides vondrozo Sparks & Reinthal, 2001

Species of fish

Ptychochromoides vondrozo is a critically endangered species of cichlid endemic to the Mananara-sud river and its tributaries near Vondrozo in southeastern Madagascar. These are deep and moderate to fast-flowing. Its entire range covers less than 100 square kilometres (39 mi^{2}), which makes it highly threatened from continued sedimentation caused by deforestation. It is also threatened by other species that have been introduced to the region. It reaches a length of 20.4 centimetres (8.0 in) SL.
