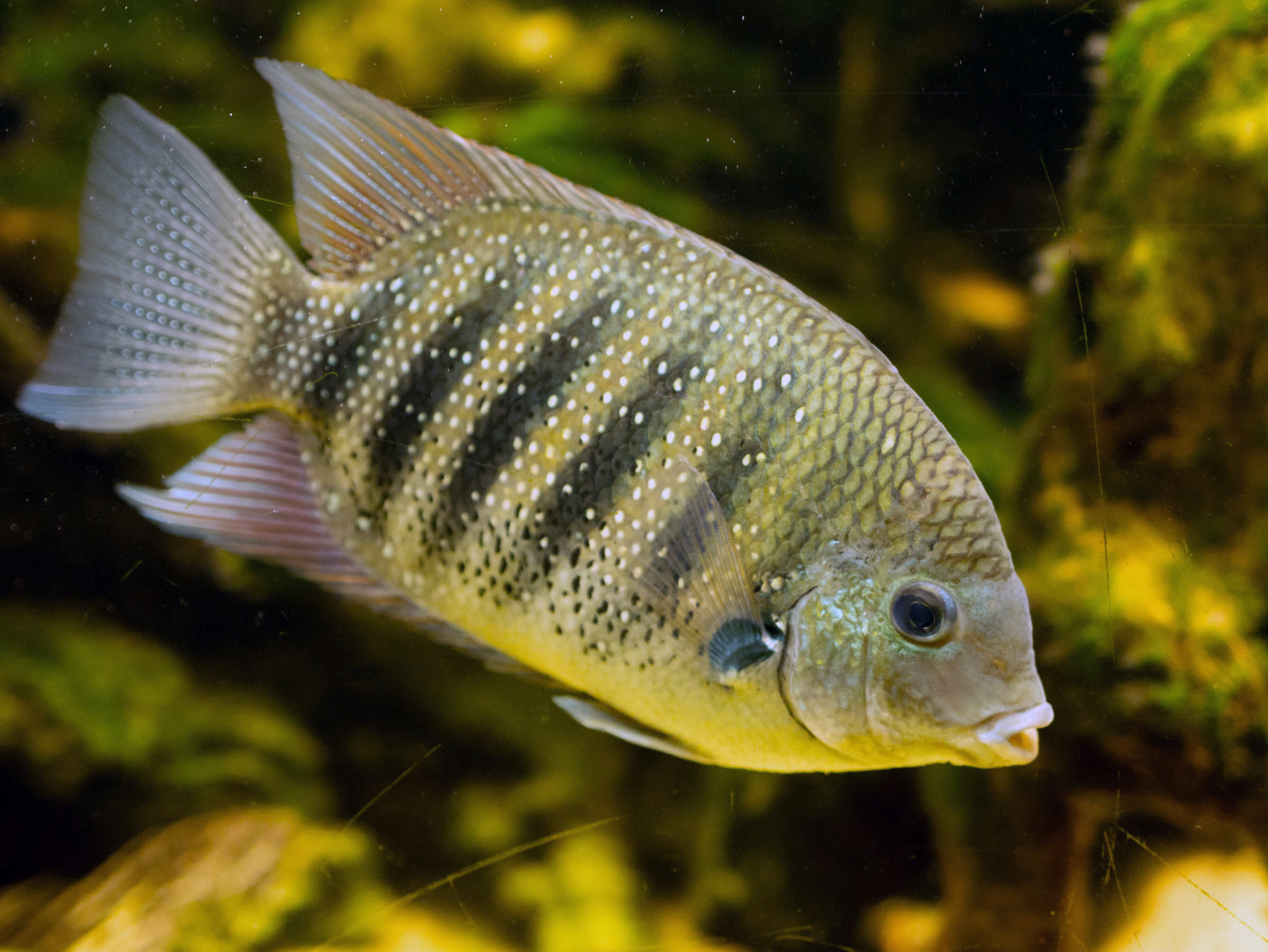

Conservation status
- Least Concern (IUCN 3.1)

Scientific classification
- Kingdom: Animalia
- Phylum: Chordata
- Class: Actinopterygii
- Order: Cichliformes
- Family: Cichlidae
- Genus: Etroplus
- Species: E. suratensis

Binomial name
- Etroplus suratensis (Bloch, 1790)

= Green chromide =

Species of fish

The green chromide (Etroplus suratensis) is a species of cichlid fish that is native to fresh and brackish water habitats in some parts in India such as Kerala, Goa, Chilika Lake in Odisha and Sri Lanka. The species was first described by Marcus Elieser Bloch in 1790. This species and other members of the genus Etroplus are relatively closely related to the Paretroplus cichlids from Madagascar.

Other common names include pearlspot cichlid, banded pearlspot, and striped chromide. In Kerala, it is known locally as karimeen. In Tamil Nadu, it is known locally as the pappan or pappa. In Goa, the fish is known as kalundar. In Odisha, the local name is kundal. In Sri Lanka this fish is known as Mal koraliya.

It has been introduced in various parts of the world outside its native range, including Singapore, where it occurs in estuaries. The Government of Kerala declared pearlspot as the official fish of Kerala.

== Habitat and behavior ==
The green chromide lives in brackish water habitat types, such as river deltas. It eats mainly aquatic plants, including filamentous algae and diatoms, but it consumes the occasional mollusk and other animal matter. This species engages in attentive parental care in which several adults care for each brood.

== Appearance ==
The adult is oval in shape with a short snout. It is grey green with dark barring and a dark spot at the base of the pectoral fin. It commonly reaches 20 cm (8 in) in length, and the maximum length is twice that.

== Relationship with humans ==
Etroplus suratensis is a popular food fish and it is considered a delicacy.

Etroplus suratensis and E. maculatus form the main species and the former is dominant among pearl spots in reservoirs of India. They mainly feed on detritus and occupy the same niche as that of Oreochromis mossambicus. These fishes are a popular delicacy but their biomass is very low in reservoirs compared to other cichlids.

In 2010 this species was named the official state fish of Kerala. The following year was declared "The Year of the Karimeen". Karimeen pollichathu, a fried dish, is a delicacy served in restaurants. Due to low number of production and high demand, the species have often been expensive to the public. Production of the species for food is expected to increase in the near future.

== See also ==
- Indian Fish Breeds List
