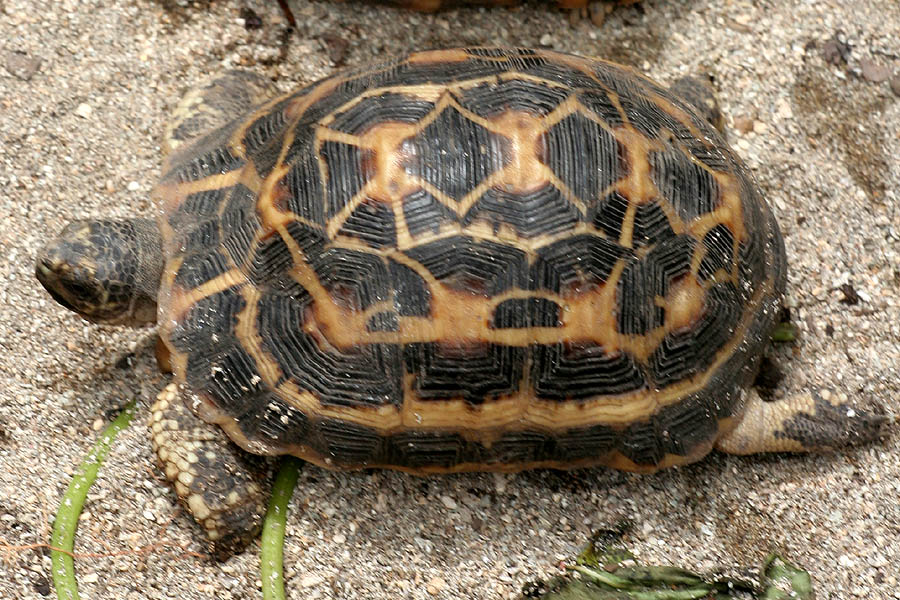
- Spider tortoise

Scientific classification
- Kingdom: Animalia
- Phylum: Chordata
- Class: Reptilia
- Order: Testudines
- Suborder: Cryptodira
- Family: Testudinidae
- Genus: Pyxis; Bell, 1827

= Pyxis (turtle) =

Genus of tortoises

Pyxis is a genus of tortoise in the family Testudinidae. It contains the following species:

- Flat-backed spider tortoise (Pyxis planicauda)
- Spider tortoise (Pyxis arachnoides)
