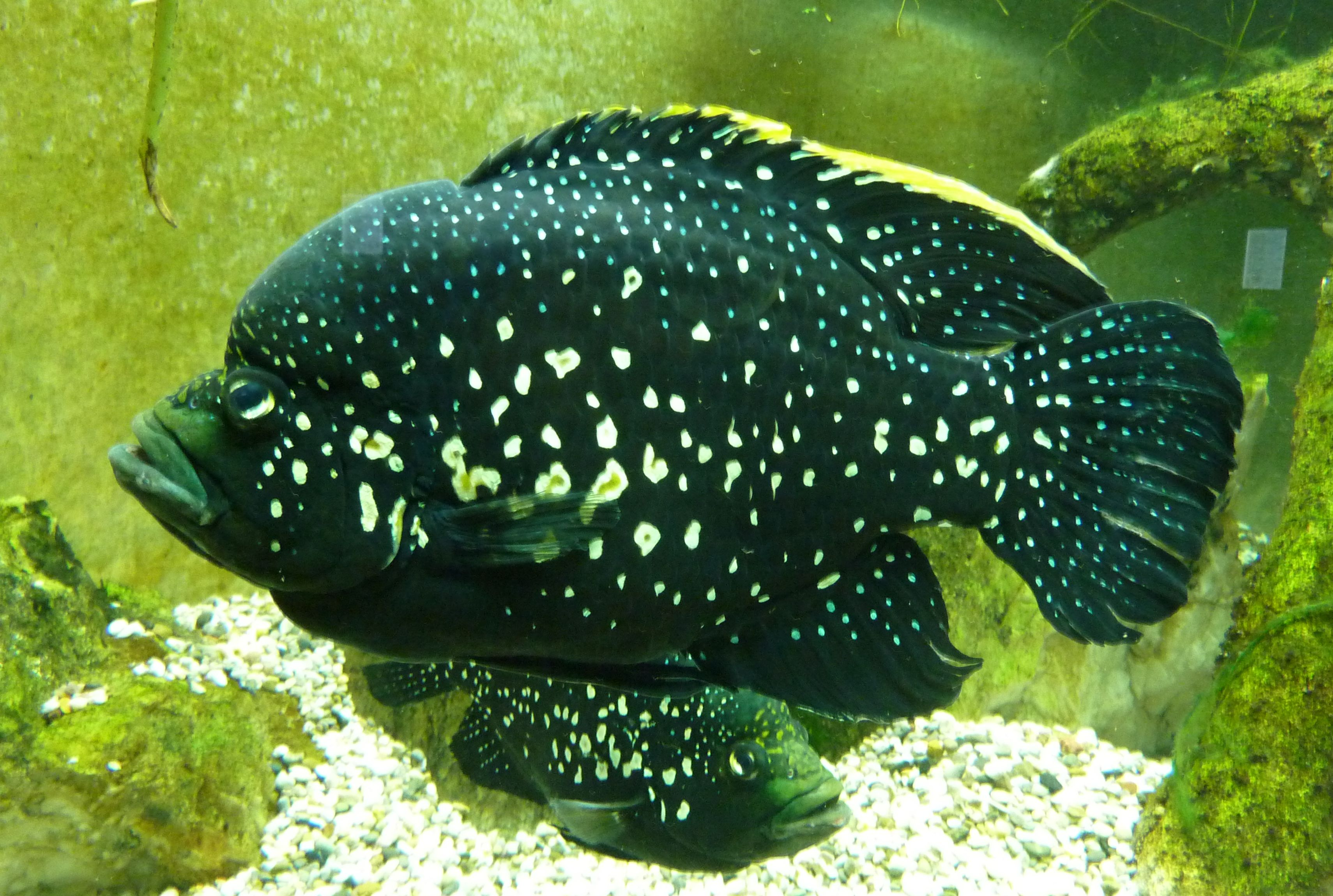
- Mature male P. polleni. Note the head hump, a common feature of dominant male cichlids. Behind him is a humpless individual, likely one of his mates

Conservation status
- Vulnerable (IUCN 3.1)

Scientific classification
- Kingdom: Animalia
- Phylum: Chordata
- Class: Actinopterygii
- Order: Cichliformes
- Family: Cichlidae
- Genus: Paratilapia
- Species: P. polleni

Binomial name
- Paratilapia polleni Bleeker, 1868

Synonyms
- Paracara typus Bleeker, 1878; Paratilapia typus (Bleeker, 1878); Paratilapia bleekeri Sauvage, 1882

= Paratilapia polleni =

Species of fish

Paratilapia polleni is a medium-sized cichlid endemic to Madagascar. It is also a popular fish for display at public aquaria.

It is sometimes referred to by the common names starry-night cichlid, polleni cichlid, and black diamond cichlid, while marakely (black fish) is one of its native names. This species is probably the only known member of its genus, as its current congener, P. toddi, from the African mainland, doubtfully belongs to this genus. Its specific name honours François Pollen (1842-1888), a Dutch naturalist and merchant, who collected the type when visiting Madagascar with fellow Dutch naturalist and explorer Douwe Casparus van Dam (1827-1898).

== Morphology ==
P. polleni is a laterally compressed, full-bodied fish. Like most cichlids, it resembles a perch-type fish in shape, hence the taxonomic designation perciformes - 'perch-like'. Males in captivity develop a nuchal hump, a layer of fat above the eyes, though not to the same degree as other similar African cichlids, such as Cyphotilapia frontosa, and tilapias of Africa.

Adult and subadult dominant P. polleni individuals are jet black in color, covered with brilliant iridescent spots which shift from golden to blue depending on the movement of the fish and the angle of the light; the eye is a bright yellow. The male can reach almost 28 cm (11 in) in total length; females are usually half that length. Sexing individuals thus becomes easier as they mature. In addition, males tend to have longer and sharper pelvic fins, a more rounded head shape, and the edges of the dorsal and anal fins are often straighter in males, and more rounded in females. Among aquarists, females, though smaller, are said to be more beautiful in their coloration patterning.

In the USA a few years ago, a tropical fish wholesaler from New Jersey was maintaining both 'spot' variations, which gave him an opportunity to observe them side by side. He noticed a distinct difference in behavior, size, and fright coloration, which made him certain that rather than being the same species, the fishes might well be two different ones. As a result of following scientific investigation to determine anatomical differences, the small-spot variant was established as the species originally described as Paratilapia polleni Bleeker, 1898, and that the large-spot variant was a distinct species.

The name Paratilapia bleekeri Sauvage, 1882, (honoring Bleeker, who described P. polleni), was revived and applied to the latter form. P. bleekeri is a larger fish than P. polleni, and can reach 30 cm when fully mature, with males larger than females.

== Habitat and behavior ==
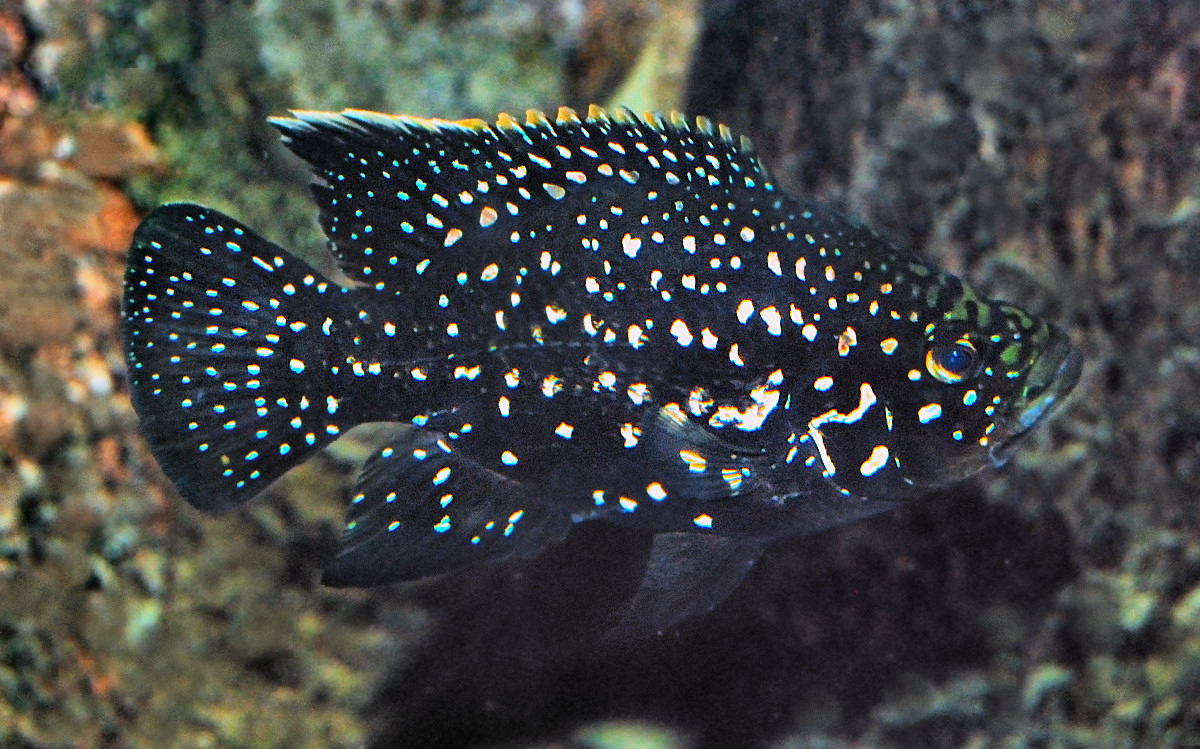
Adult of Paratilapia polleni

In the wild, P. polleni is a very adaptable cichlid. It can be found at altitudes up to 1500 m with water temperatures of 12°C and in hot springs which can reach 40°C. It inhabits a number of rivers and associated streams in northern Madagascar, including the environs of the town of Andapa, where most individuals exported for the aquarium trade in recent years were collected. It is an omnivorous fish and occasional opportunistic piscivore, approaching smaller unsuspecting fish by stealth, with their dark coloration giving them an advantage. P. polleni observed hunting in the aquarium environment will sneak up on smaller fish from below during the predawn hours and suck the smaller fish into its mouth using the typical cichlid 'suction effect' caused by quickly opening its mouth. Thus, using stealth and crypsis, it is able to prey on fish it would otherwise not be able to catch. In Madagascar, P. polleni is a food fish, and like many cichlid fishes in many regions, is reputed to have a good flavor.

== In the aquarium ==
P. polleni is temperature- and pH-tolerant (in the aquarium the temperature should be of 72-80°F, pH: 6.5-8.0). Thus in captivity, it is reasonably hardy and rarely shy. As such, this fish is an ideal aquarium resident if given the appropriate environment and tank mates considering its formidable stature. They eat most commercial fish foods, such as flakes, pellets, frozen, and alike. They are also highly proficient at capturing live foods as well.

P. polleni displays the same kind of 'intelligent' behavior common to other cichlids. They can be trained to eat from the hand and can recognize and approach its owner (often retreating from an unfamiliar person). In the aquarium, P. polleni is more cautious and easily spooked than many of the more readily available cichlids, but otherwise is adaptable to aquarium life. P. polleni is aggressive towards conspecifics, especially if a male / female bond develops. The pair bonds between males and females are sporadic and easily broken. If this happens, the female can become imperiled by the male's aggression if not removed.

Despite these qualities, P. polleni is not well known in the aquarium trade, though this is beginning to change. If they display full coloration, non-dominant and sub-dominant individuals of any size will often suffer aggression from the alpha individual(s). For this reason, there is generally only one or two fully colored individuals in an aquarium with many specimens. These traits may contribute to the relative obscurity of P. polleni in the hobby.

P. polleni ranks among the more aggressive African cichlids, comparable to Malawi and tilapia cichlids. Some individuals have been known to kill their tank mates upon reaching maturity, though P. polleni generally tolerates tank mates too large to eat fairly well. Successful aquarium spawnings are common. They have been reported living with other cichlids, as they are not that aggressive, but they are best with other fish and cichlids around about the same size.
