= Ptychochromoides itasy =

Conservation status
- Critically Endangered (IUCN 3.1)

Scientific classification
- Kingdom: Animalia
- Phylum: Chordata
- Class: Actinopterygii
- Order: Cichliformes
- Family: Cichlidae
- Genus: Ptychochromoides
- Species: P. itasy

Binomial name
- Ptychochromoides itasy Sparks, 2004

Species of fish

Ptychochromoides itasy is a species of cichlid fish from central Madagascar. Until rediscovered in a pond at a tributary of the Tsiribihina River in late 2010, it was only known from Lake Itasy where last seen in the 1970s. The reason for its extirpation from Lake Itasy was likely habitat degradation and competition/predation by introduced species.
