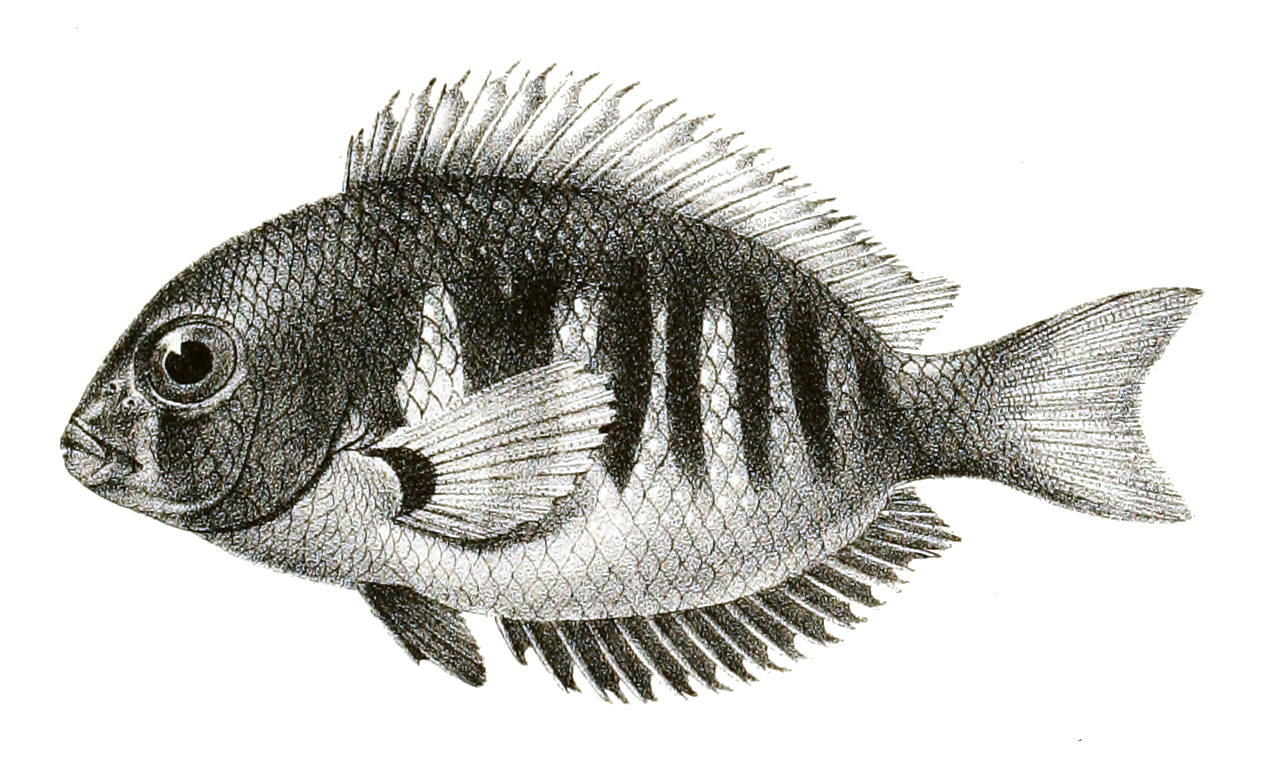
- illustration by Francis Day (1878)

Conservation status
- Endangered (IUCN 3.1)

Scientific classification
- Domain: Eukaryota
- Kingdom: Animalia
- Phylum: Chordata
- Class: Actinopterygii
- Order: Cichliformes
- Family: Cichlidae
- Genus: Etroplus
- Species: E. canarensis

Binomial name
- Etroplus canarensis F. Day, 1877

= Canara pearlspot =

Species of fish

The Canara pearlspot (Etroplus canarensis), also known as banded chromide or Canara pearlspot cichlid, is an endangered species of cichlid endemic to South Karnataka in India.

== Habitat and distribution ==
It belongs to a small genus of species of cichlids from Asia, and unlike other members of the genus Etroplus it does not occur in brackish waters, being found in freshwater only.

== Size ==
It reaches a length of 11.5 centimetres (4.5 in) TL.

== In the aquarium ==
It is a much sought out cichlid, somewhat rare in hobby aquariums. In the recent past there have been some reports of breeding in captivity.
