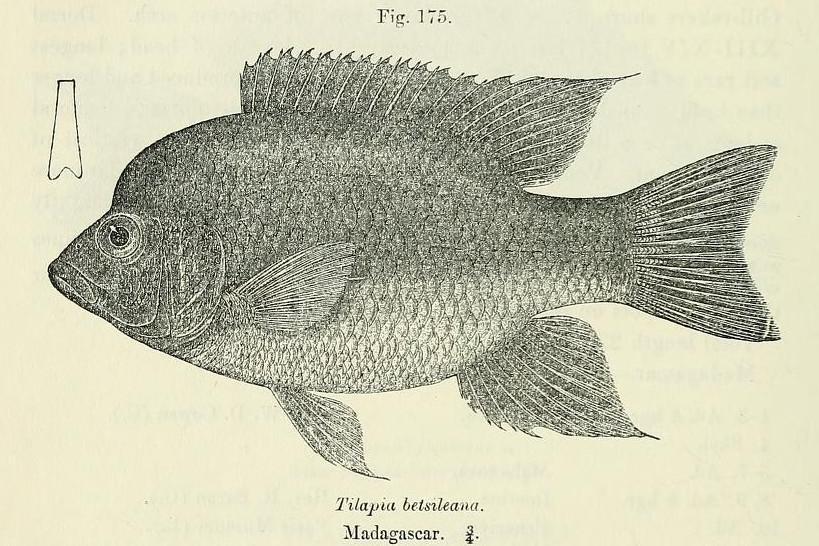

Conservation status
- Critically endangered, possibly extinct (IUCN 3.1)

Scientific classification
- Kingdom: Animalia
- Phylum: Chordata
- Class: Actinopterygii
- Order: Cichliformes
- Family: Cichlidae
- Genus: Ptychochromoides
- Species: P. betsileanus

Binomial name
- Ptychochromoides betsileanus (Boulenger, 1899)

Synonyms
- Tilapia betsileana Boulenger, 1899; Ptychochromis betsileanus (Boulenger, 1899)

= Trondo mainty =

Species of fish

The trondo mainty (Ptychochromoides betsileanus) is a critically endangered species of cichlid endemic to the Onilahy River Basin in southwestern Madagascar. Its remaining range covers less than 10 km^{2} (3.9 mi^{2}) and it is highly threatened by habitat loss, fishing, and competition with/predation by introduced species. Another cichlid from the same basin, Ptychochromis onilahy, is probably already extinct. The trondo mainty reaches a standard length (SL) of 24 cm (9.4 in).
