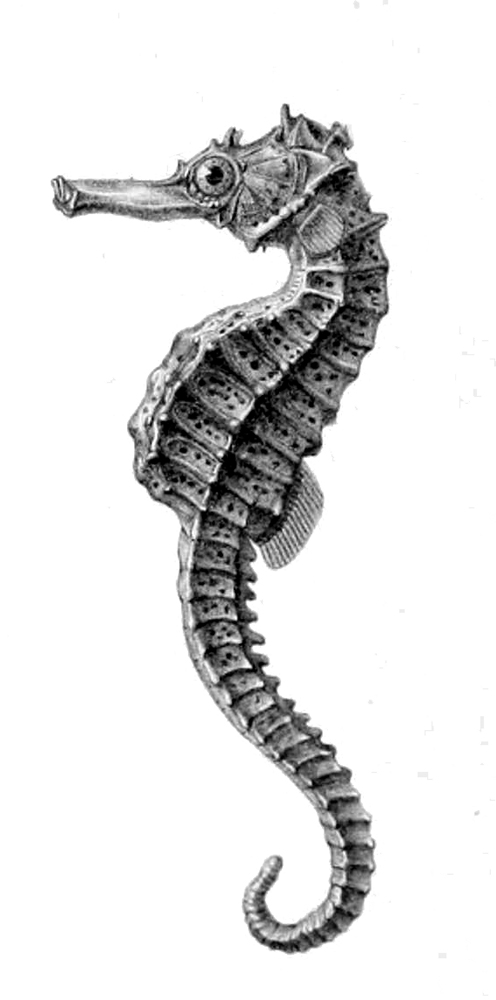

Conservation status
- Data Deficient (IUCN 3.1)

Scientific classification
- Kingdom: Animalia
- Phylum: Chordata
- Class: Actinopterygii
- Order: Syngnathiformes
- Family: Syngnathidae
- Genus: Hippocampus
- Species: H. borboniensis

Binomial name
- Hippocampus borboniensis (A. H. A. Duméril, 1870)

= Réunion seahorse =

Species of fish

The Réunion seahorse (Hippocampus borboniensis) is a synonym of Hippocampus kuda, Weber, 1913. It is found in Madagascar, Mauritius, Mozambique, Réunion, South Africa, and Tanzania. Its natural habitat is subtidal aquatic beds. It is threatened by habitat loss.

== Sources ==
- Project Seahorse 2003. Hippocampus borboniensis. 2006 IUCN Red List of Threatened Species. Downloaded on 4 August 2007.
