= Marolambo =

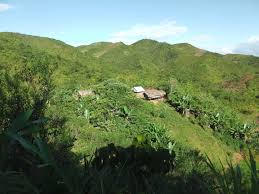

- Location in Madagascar
- Coordinates: 20°03′S 48°07′E
- Country: Madagascar
- Region: Atsinanana
- District: Marolambo District

Population (2019)census
  - Total: 27,509
- Time zone: UTC3 (EAT)
- Postal code: 513

Marolambo is a village and commune (kaominina) located in the Atsinanana region of eastern Madagascar. It is along the Nosivolo River near the junction with the Sandranamby River, and is also the capital of the Marolambo District.

== Overview ==
The town was founded by French colonialists, though their footprint was limited. It is the largest town on the Nosivolo River. The area is so remote that no automobiles were present in the town between 1972 and 2006, according to a 2010 report. From the mid-1940s until the early 1970s it was possible to reach the village by car, but the road deteriorated from lack of maintenance.

According to researcher Hilde Nielssen, who has done anthropology field work in the area, the lack of infrastructure and remoteness of the area makes it a relatively undesirable placement for outsiders such as government officials and medical workers. Nevertheless, Marolambo is still a local center for commerce, education, and health in the area, as it has a public and private high school, public and private hospital, and a few merchants.

A small airstrip was built near the village by Mission Aviation Fellowship (MAF) around 1993 by shearing off hilltops, though its dirt surface would suffer damage from erosion during the rainy season. Between 2007 and 2009, the airstrip was paved by MAF, who brings supplies to the area.

The Nosivolo River is known for its biodiversity, and the endangered Oxylapia polli (locally known as the songatana) fish species (among other rare species) is found in the Marolambo rapids near the village.

== Nature ==
- Marolambo National Park

== Religion ==
- FJKM - Fiangonan'i Jesoa Kristy eto Madagasikara (Church of Jesus Christ in Madagascar)
- FLM - Fiangonana Loterana Malagasy (Malagasy Lutheran Church)
- Roman Catholic Church has got a mission since 1989.

== Access ==
Marolambo is of difficult access, most of the year only tractors pass the unpaved National road 23 of 130 km from Mahanoro.
