= Katria =

Conservation status
- Endangered (IUCN 3.1)

Scientific classification
- Kingdom: Animalia
- Phylum: Chordata
- Class: Actinopterygii
- Order: Cichliformes
- Family: Cichlidae
- Subfamily: Ptychochrominae
- Genus: Katria; Stiassny & Sparks, 2006
- Species: K. katria

Binomial name
- Katria katria (Reinthal & Stiassny, 1997)

Synonyms
- Ptychochromoides katria Reinthal & Stiassny, 1997

Genus of fishes

Katria is a genus of freshwater fish in the cichlid family. It contains the single species Katria katria, a vulnerable species from the Mangoro and Nosivolo Rivers in east-central Madagascar, that was formerly included in the genus Ptychochromoides. The only other monotypic cichlid genus in Madagascar is Oxylapia, and it is restricted to the same region as Katria. In 2010, the Nosivolo River was designated as a Ramsar Site. The Katria reaches about 13 centimetres (5.1 in) in length.
