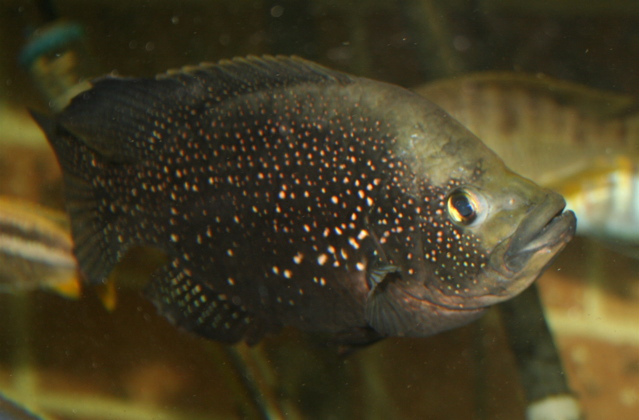
- P. polleni

Scientific classification
- Domain: Eukaryota
- Kingdom: Animalia
- Phylum: Chordata
- Class: Actinopterygii
- Order: Cichliformes
- Family: Cichlidae
- Subfamily: Paratilapiinae; Tawil, 2001
- Genus: Paratilapia; Bleeker, 1868

Type species
- Paratilapia polleni Bleeker, 1868

= Paratilapia =

Genus of fishes

Paratilapia is a genus of cichlids generally restricted to Madagascar. These are large, dark cichlids densely covered in light spots. An additional very poorly known species from the Congo River basin in mainland Africa is sometimes also placed in the genus, but this is highly questionable and arguably it is better placed in the "wastebasket genus" Haplochromis for the time being.

== Taxonomy ==
Phylogenetic analyses of DNA sequence and morphological data have hitherto been unable to resolve the relationships of the genus to satisfaction. For example, sequence data from mtDNA 16S rRNA and COI disagree regarding its placement, and the standard hypothesis among cichlids - that this is due to hybridization effects - can obviously not apply here as both genes are mitochondrial and affected by hybrid introgression in the same way.

In any case, Paratilapia tends to occupy a position between African subfamilies such as the Ptychochrominae and the Indo-Malagasy clade comprising the Etroplinae and Ptychochrominae in most analyses, and this may well be correct. If so, its ancestors must have separated from those of all other living cichlids in the Mesozoic. They most probably were already a distinct lineage by the Turonian (about 90 million years ago), as the Indo-Malagasy clade must have originated before the split of Madagascar from the Indian Plate, which commenced then and was finished by the end of the Cretaceous. Consequently, they would have to be classified as a subfamily of their own, the Paratilapiinae. While currently included in this genus, P. toddi probably does not belong here. Correct placement is uncertain.

== Species ==
The recognized species in this genus are:

- Paratilapia polleni Bleeker, 1868
- Paratilapia toddi Boulenger, 1905 – unlikely to belong in this genus
