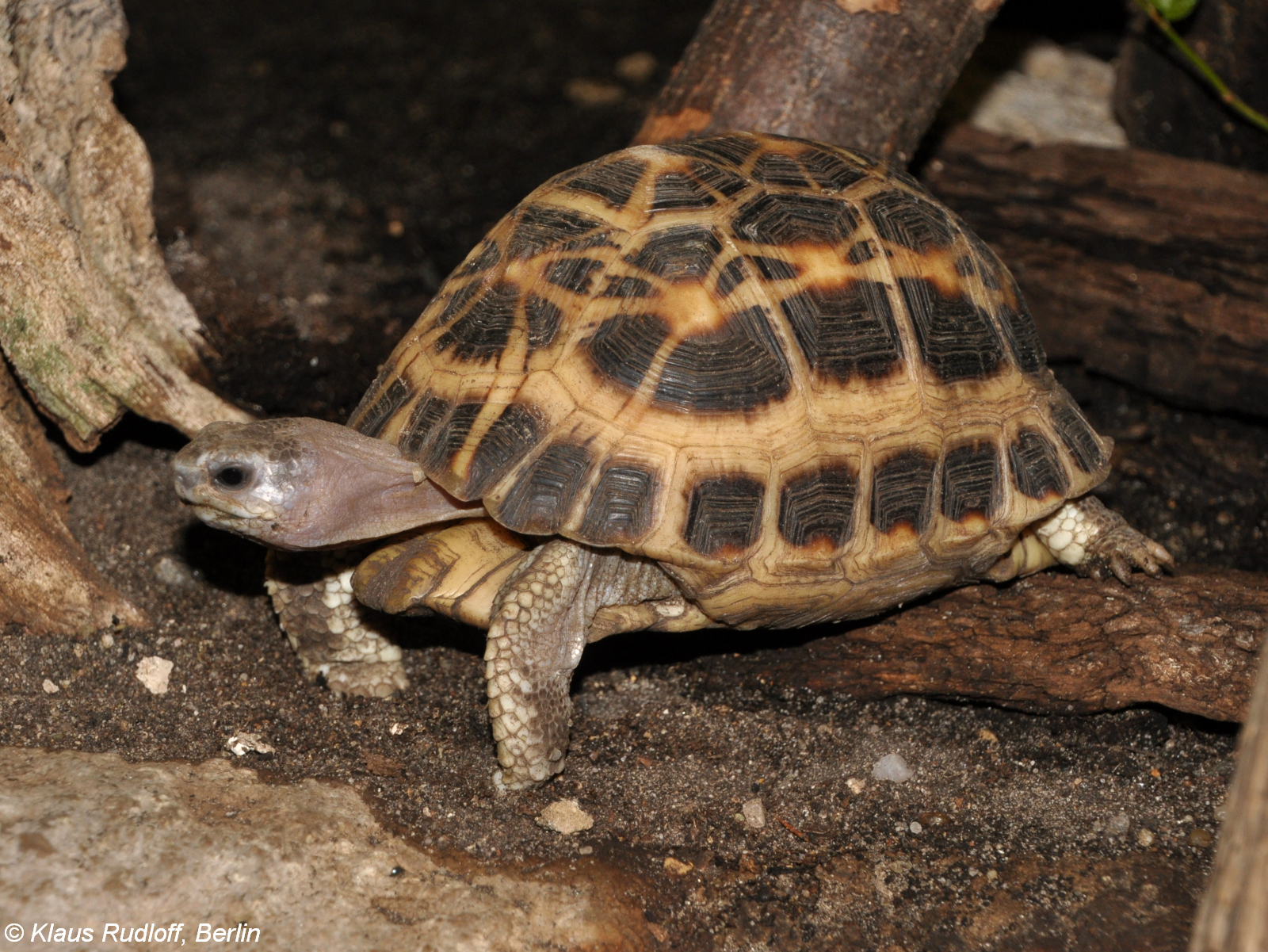

Conservation status
- Critically Endangered (IUCN 3.1)
- CITES Appendix I

Scientific classification
- Kingdom: Animalia
- Phylum: Chordata
- Class: Reptilia
- Order: Testudines
- Suborder: Cryptodira
- Family: Testudinidae
- Genus: Pyxis
- Species: P. arachnoides

Binomial name
- Pyxis arachnoides Bell, 1827

Synonyms
- Pyxis arachnoides arachnoides: Pyxis arachnoides Bell, 1827; Testudo (Pyxis) aranoides Gray, 1831 (ex errore); Pyxis aranoides Gray, 1831; Pyxis madagascariensis Lesson, 1831; Testudo (Pyxis) arachnoides Fitzinger, 1835; Bellemys arachnoides Williams, 1950; Pyxis arachnoides arachnoides Bour, 1979; Pyxis arachnoides brygooi: Pyxoides brygooi Vuillemin & Domergue, 1972; Pyxis arachnoides brygooi Bour, 1979; Pyxis arachnoides oblonga: Pyxis arachnoides matzi Bour, 1979; Pyxis arachnoides oblonga Bour, 1985

= Spider tortoise =

Species of tortoise

The spider tortoise (Pyxis arachnoides) is a species of tortoise in the family Testudinidae that is endemic to Madagascar and is one of only two species in the genus Pyxis.

== Habitat ==
The remaining tortoises are found only in south western Madagascar, where they inhabit the spiny vegetation of the sandy coastal areas.

== Life cycle and breeding ==
Mating

Very little is known about the life cycle of this endangered tortoise, which is believed to live for up to 70 years. Here they feed on young leaves, insect larvae, and even the droppings of larger animals. When the wet season arrives, the dormancy period ends and the tortoises begin to mate. Females only lay one egg when they reproduce, and the egg is incubated for about 220–250 days. The largest threats the endangered tortoise faces are the pet trade, poaching for food, and habitat destruction.

== Conservation ==
Spider tortoise in captivity.

Their trade is illegal in Madagascar, but they are extensively smuggled for food, body parts, and illegal pets.
