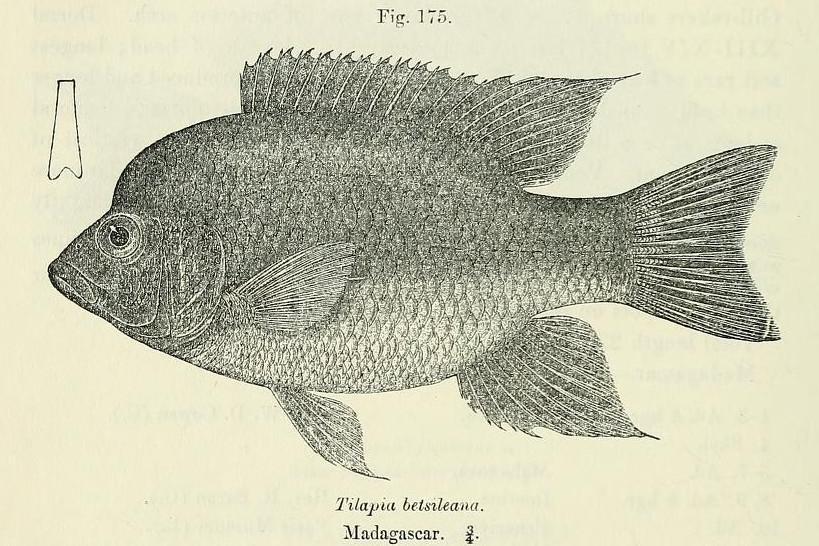
- Ptychochromoides betsileanus

Scientific classification
- Kingdom: Animalia
- Phylum: Chordata
- Class: Actinopterygii
- Order: Cichliformes
- Family: Cichlidae
- Subfamily: Ptychochrominae
- Genus: Ptychochromoides; Kiener & Maugé, 1966

Type species
- Tilapia betsileana Boulenger, 1899

Species
- 3, see text

= Ptychochromoides =

Genus of fish in Madagascar

Ptychochromoides is a genus of cichlids endemic to Madagascar. Of the three described species, two are critically endangered and one was considered extinct until rediscovered in late 2010.

== Species ==
The genus formerly included Katria katria, which was moved to its own genus in 2006. There are currently three recognized species in Ptychochromoides:

- Ptychochromoides betsileanus (Boulenger, 1899) (Trondo mainty)
- Ptychochromoides itasy Sparks, 2004
- Ptychochromoides vondrozo Sparks & Reinthal, 2001
