= Oxylapia =

Conservation status
- Endangered (IUCN 3.1)

Scientific classification
- Kingdom: Animalia
- Phylum: Chordata
- Class: Actinopterygii
- Order: Cichliformes
- Family: Cichlidae
- Subfamily: Ptychochrominae
- Genus: Oxylapia; Kiener & Maugé, 1966
- Species: O. polli

Binomial name
- Oxylapia polli Kiener & Maugé, 1966

Genus of fishes

Oxylapia is a genus of freshwater fish in the family Cichlidae. It contains the single species Oxylapia polli, known locally as the songatana. It is an endangered species, endemic to the Marolambo Rapids in the Nosivolo River (a tributary of the Mangoro River) in east-central Madagascar. It is threatened by habitat loss and sedimentation caused by deforestation. The only other monotypic cichlid genus in Madagascar is Katria, and it is restricted to the same region as Oxylapia. In 2010, the Nosivolo River was designated as a Ramsar Site. The Oxylapia is the conservation flagship species for the district capital Marolambo.

Oxylapia is a highly aggressive, elongate species that reaches about 13 centimetres (5.1 in) in length. It is the Malagasy cichlid most adapted to rheophilic conditions, but not the only (members of the lamena group in the genus Paretroplus are also rheophilic).

Its specific name honours Max Poll (1908-1991), a Belgian ichthyologist for his research into African cichlids and for the guidance he gave to the authors.
