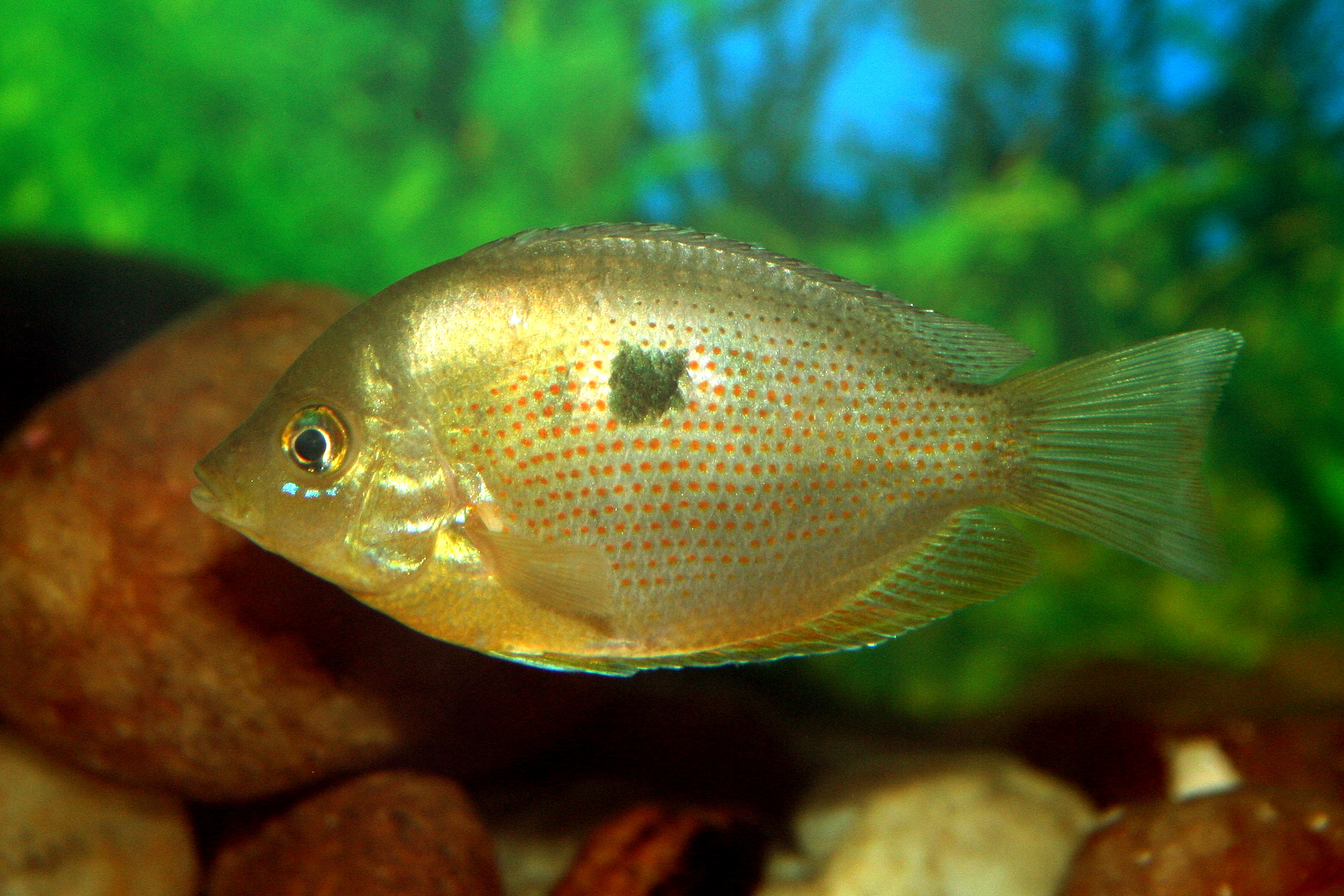
- Orange chromide from the Bharathapuzha River, India

Conservation status
- Least Concern (IUCN 3.1)

Scientific classification
- Kingdom: Animalia
- Phylum: Chordata
- Class: Actinopterygii
- Order: Cichliformes
- Family: Cichlidae
- Subfamily: Etroplinae
- Genus: Pseudetroplus; Bleeker, 1862
- Species: P. maculatus

Binomial name
- Pseudetroplus maculatus (Bloch, 1795)

Synonyms
- Etroplus maculatus (Bloch, 1795); Chaetodon maculatus Bloch, 1795; Etroplus coruchi Cuvier, 1830; Glyphisodon kakaitsel Lacepède, 1802; Glyphisodon koruschi Cuvier, 1830

= Orange chromide =

Species of fish endemic to Southern India and Sri Lanka

The orange chromide (Pseudetroplus maculatus) is a species of cichlid endemic to freshwater and brackish streams, lagoons and estuaries of southern India and Sri Lanka. It is popular with fishkeeping hobbyists, and reaches a length of up to 8 cm (3.1 in).

== Names ==
The specific epithet of this species, maculatus, is Latin for "spotted", and is a reference to the large black spot on the upper flanks. In Malayalam, it is known as pallathi (പള്ളത്തി).

== Diet ==
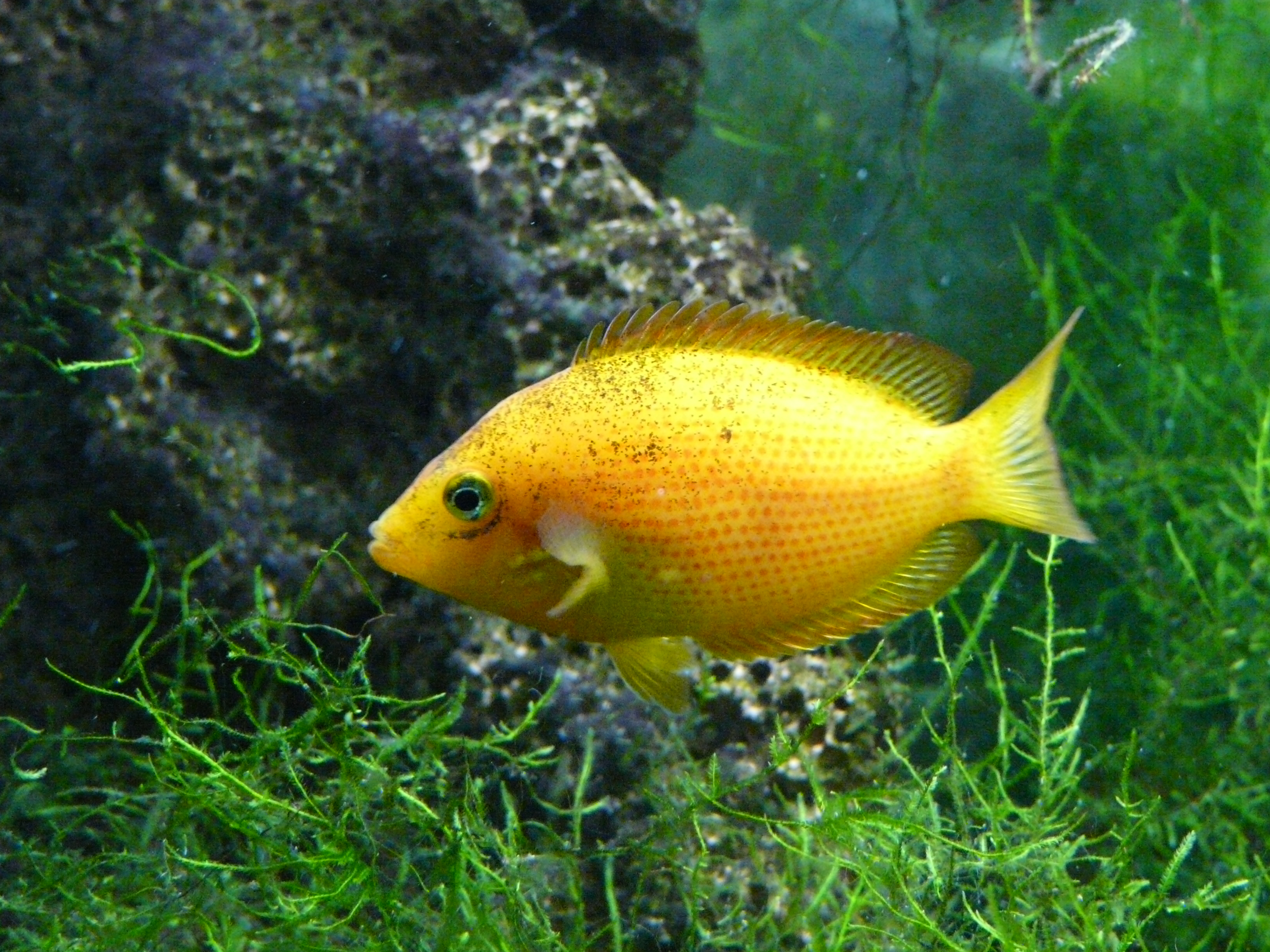
The selectively bred bright orange-yellow variant often seen in the aquarium trade

This species co-occurs throughout its range with the green chromide (Etroplus suratensis) and preys on the eggs and larvae of the latter. Additionally, it removes parasites from the larger green chromide; this is an example of cleaning symbiosis. This species also feeds on zooplankton and algae.

== Parental care ==
Young orange chromides feed on the mucous coating of their parents; this is essential for their survival. During the feeding period, the parent fishes' mucous gland secretions increase by 34%.
