= Ctenostoma rugicolle =

Scientific classification
- Kingdom: Animalia
- Phylum: Arthropoda
- Clade: Pancrustacea
- Class: Insecta
- Order: Coleoptera
- Suborder: Adephaga
- Family: Cicindelidae
- Genus: Ctenostoma
- Species: C. rugicolle

Binomial name
- Ctenostoma rugicolle W.Horn, 1904

Species of beetle

Ctenostoma rugicolle, the rough-neck comb-mouthed beetle, is a species of tiger beetle. This species is found in Ecuador, Peru and Brazil, where it inhabits low- to mountainous rainforests and cloud forests.

Adults are medium-sized (11–12.5 mm (0.43–0.49 in)) and have a shiny black colour.

The species was formerly considered a form of Ctenostoma batesii.
