= Ctenostoma brunneum =

Scientific classification
- Kingdom: Animalia
- Phylum: Arthropoda
- Clade: Pancrustacea
- Class: Insecta
- Order: Coleoptera
- Suborder: Adephaga
- Family: Cicindelidae
- Genus: Ctenostoma
- Species: C. brunneum

Binomial name
- Ctenostoma brunneum Naviaux, 1998

Species of beetle

Ctenostoma brunneum, the brownish comb-mouthed beetle, is a species of tiger beetle. This species is found in Ecuador, where it inhabits mid-altitude rainforests.

Adults are medium-sized (10 mm) and have a dark reddish brown colour. Its appearance is similar to the closely related species Ctenostoma immaculatum.
