= Ctenostoma erwini =

Scientific classification
- Kingdom: Animalia
- Phylum: Arthropoda
- Clade: Pancrustacea
- Class: Insecta
- Order: Coleoptera
- Suborder: Adephaga
- Family: Cicindelidae
- Genus: Ctenostoma
- Species: C. erwini

Binomial name
- Ctenostoma erwini Naviaux, 1998

Species of beetle

Ctenostoma erwini, or Erwin's comb-mouthed beetle, is a species of tiger beetle. This species is found in Panama, where it inhabits low- to midland rainforests and cloud forests.

Larvae have been recorded from burrows in twigs and small branches.
