= Ctenostoma quechua =

Scientific classification
- Kingdom: Animalia
- Phylum: Arthropoda
- Clade: Pancrustacea
- Class: Insecta
- Order: Coleoptera
- Suborder: Adephaga
- Family: Cicindelidae
- Genus: Ctenostoma
- Species: C. quechua

Binomial name
- Ctenostoma quechua Naviaux & Brzoska, 2009

Species of beetle

Ctenostoma quechua is a species of tiger beetle. This species is found in Bolivia.
