= Ctenostoma schaumi =

Scientific classification
- Kingdom: Animalia
- Phylum: Arthropoda
- Clade: Pancrustacea
- Class: Insecta
- Order: Coleoptera
- Suborder: Adephaga
- Family: Cicindelidae
- Genus: Ctenostoma
- Species: C. schaumi

Binomial name
- Ctenostoma schaumi W.Horn, 1895

Species of beetle

Ctenostoma schaumi is a species of tiger beetle. This species is found in French Guiana and Brazil., where it inhabits the southern Atlantic forest.

Adults are brachypterous.

== Subspecies ==
- Ctenostoma schaumi schaumi (French Guiana, Brazil) - Schaum's comb-mouthed beetle
- Ctenostoma schaumi pilosulum W.Horn, 1898 (Brazil) - felt-covered small comb-mouthed beetle
