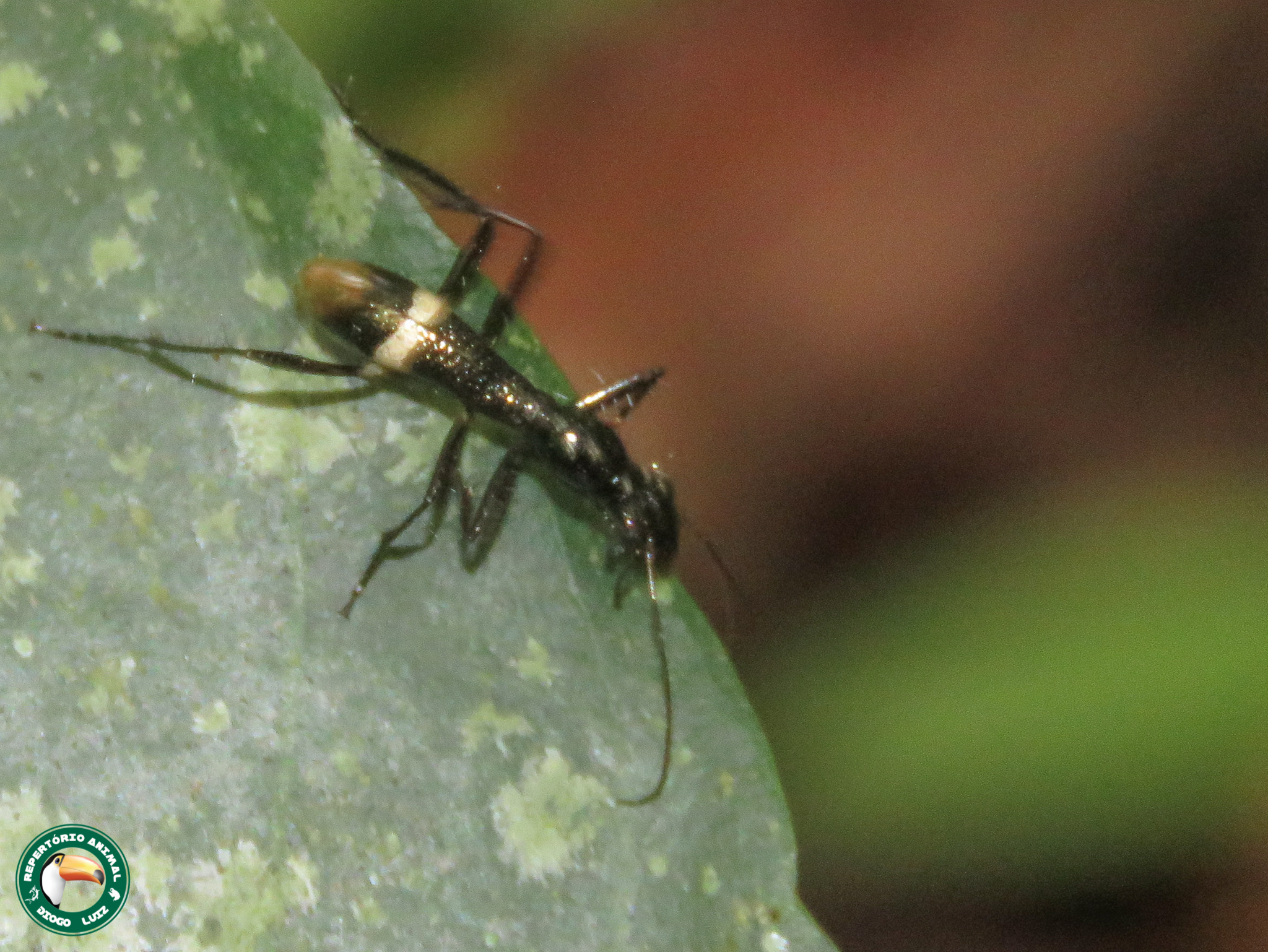

Scientific classification
- Kingdom: Animalia
- Phylum: Arthropoda
- Clade: Pancrustacea
- Class: Insecta
- Order: Coleoptera
- Suborder: Adephaga
- Family: Cicindelidae
- Genus: Ctenostoma
- Species: C. ichneumoneum

Binomial name
- Ctenostoma ichneumoneum Dejean, 1826

Synonyms
- Ctenostoma interruptum Chaudoir, 1861

= Ctenostoma ichneumoneum =

Species of beetle

Ctenostoma ichneumoneum is a species of tiger beetle. This species is found in Paraguay and Brazil, where it inhabits the southern Atlantic Forest.

Adults are brachypterous.

== Subspecies ==
- Ctenostoma ichneumoneum ellipticum Naviaux, 1998 (Paraguay, Brazil) - ellipsis-marked comb-mouthed beetle
- Ctenostoma ichneumoneum ichneumoneum (Brazil) - wasp-like comb-mouthed beetle
