= Ctenostoma unifasciatum =

Scientific classification
- Kingdom: Animalia
- Phylum: Arthropoda
- Clade: Pancrustacea
- Class: Insecta
- Order: Coleoptera
- Suborder: Adephaga
- Family: Cicindelidae
- Genus: Ctenostoma
- Species: C. unifasciatum

Binomial name
- Ctenostoma unifasciatum Dejean, 1831

Synonyms
- Ctenostoma laceratum R.F.Sahlberg, 1847; Ctenostoma klugii Lacordaire, 1843; Ctenostoma trifasciatum Lacordaire, 1843; Ctenostoma trinotatum Klug, 1824

Species of beetle

Ctenostoma unifasciatum is a species of tiger beetle. This species is found in Brazil, where it inhabits the southern Atlantic Forest.

Adults are brachypterous.

== Subspecies ==
- Ctenostoma unifasciatum unifasciatum - one-lined comb-mouthed beetle
- Ctenostoma unifasciatum affine W. Horn 1894 - kin small comb-mouthed beetle
