= Ctenostoma monnei =

Scientific classification
- Kingdom: Animalia
- Phylum: Arthropoda
- Clade: Pancrustacea
- Class: Insecta
- Order: Coleoptera
- Suborder: Adephaga
- Family: Cicindelidae
- Genus: Ctenostoma
- Species: C. monnei

Binomial name
- Ctenostoma monnei Naviaux, 2002

Species of beetle

Ctenostoma monnei, or Monne's comb-mouthed beetle, is a species of tiger beetle. This species is found in Brazil, where it inhabits the southern Atlantic Forest.

Adults are medium-sized (13-14.5 mm), brachypterous and have a shining black colour.
