= Ctenostoma ibidion =

Scientific classification
- Kingdom: Animalia
- Phylum: Arthropoda
- Clade: Pancrustacea
- Class: Insecta
- Order: Coleoptera
- Suborder: Adephaga
- Family: Cicindelidae
- Genus: Ctenostoma
- Species: C. ibidion

Binomial name
- Ctenostoma ibidion C.A.Dohrn, 1880

Species of beetle

Ctenostoma ibidion is a species of tiger beetle. This species is found in Venezuela, Ecuador and Costa Rica, where it inhabits upland to mountainous cloud forests.

== Subspecies ==
- Ctenostoma ibidion ibidion (Venezuela, Costa Rica) - Dohrn's comb-mouthed beetle
- Ctenostoma ibidion jolyi Naviaux, 1998 (Venezuela, Ecuador) - Joly's comb-mouthed beetle
