= Ctenostoma macilentum =

Scientific classification
- Kingdom: Animalia
- Phylum: Arthropoda
- Clade: Pancrustacea
- Class: Insecta
- Order: Coleoptera
- Suborder: Adephaga
- Family: Cicindelidae
- Genus: Ctenostoma
- Species: C. macilentum

Binomial name
- Ctenostoma macilentum Klug, 1834

Species of beetle

Ctenostoma macilentum, the thin comb-mouthed beetle, is a species of tiger beetle. This species is found in Brazil, where it inhabits the southern Atlantic Forest.

Adults are brachypterous.
