= Ctenostoma dokhturowi =

Scientific classification
- Kingdom: Animalia
- Phylum: Arthropoda
- Clade: Pancrustacea
- Class: Insecta
- Order: Coleoptera
- Suborder: Adephaga
- Family: Cicindelidae
- Genus: Ctenostoma
- Species: C. dokhturowi

Binomial name
- Ctenostoma dokhturowi W.Horn, 1898

Species of beetle

Ctenostoma dokhturowi, or Dokhturow’s comb-mouthed beetle, is a species of tiger beetle. This species is found in Brazil, where it inhabits the southern Atlantic Forest.

Adults are brachypterous.
