= Ctenostoma succinctum =

Scientific classification
- Kingdom: Animalia
- Phylum: Arthropoda
- Clade: Pancrustacea
- Class: Insecta
- Order: Coleoptera
- Suborder: Adephaga
- Family: Cicindelidae
- Genus: Ctenostoma
- Species: C. succinctum

Binomial name
- Ctenostoma succinctum (Laporte, 1834)

Synonyms
- Procephalus succinctus Laporte, 1834

Species of beetle

Ctenostoma succinctum, the very short comb-mouthed beetle, is a species of tiger beetle. This species is found in Colombia, Venezuela, Guyana, Surinam, French Guiana and Ecuador. It is found from lowland to mountainous areas in rainforests and cloud forests.

Adults are medium-sized (11–14 mm) and are shiny black to dark brown in colour.
