= Ctenostoma flexuosum =

Scientific classification
- Kingdom: Animalia
- Phylum: Arthropoda
- Clade: Pancrustacea
- Class: Insecta
- Order: Coleoptera
- Suborder: Adephaga
- Family: Cicindelidae
- Genus: Ctenostoma
- Species: C. flexuosum

Binomial name
- Ctenostoma flexuosum Naviaux, 1998

Species of beetle

Ctenostoma flexuosum, the flexed-fascia comb-mouthed beetle, is a species of tiger beetle. This species is found in Brazil, where it is found in lowland rainforests.

Adults are brachypterous.
