= Ctenostoma nitidum =

Scientific classification
- Kingdom: Animalia
- Phylum: Arthropoda
- Clade: Pancrustacea
- Class: Insecta
- Order: Coleoptera
- Suborder: Adephaga
- Family: Cicindelidae
- Genus: Ctenostoma
- Species: C. nitidum

Binomial name
- Ctenostoma nitidum Naviaux, 1998

Species of beetle

Ctenostoma nitidum, the brilliant comb-mouthed beetle, is a species of tiger beetle. This species is found in Bolivia and Peru, where it inhabits low to upland rainforests and cloudforests.
