= Ctenostoma jekelii =

Scientific classification
- Kingdom: Animalia
- Phylum: Arthropoda
- Clade: Pancrustacea
- Class: Insecta
- Order: Coleoptera
- Suborder: Adephaga
- Family: Cicindelidae
- Genus: Ctenostoma
- Species: C. jekelii

Binomial name
- Ctenostoma jekelii Chevrolat, 1858

Species of beetle

Ctenostoma jekelii is a species of tiger beetle. This species is found in French Guiana and Brazil, where it inhabits lowland rainforests.

Adults are brachypterous and have been recorded preying on small arboreal arthropods.

== Subspecies ==
- Ctenostoma jekelii jekelii (French Guiana, Brazil) - Jekel's comb-mouthed beetle
- Ctenostoma jekelii raresculptum W.Horn, 1898 (Brazil) - rare-sculptured comb-mouthed beetle
