= Ctenostoma ebeninum =

Scientific classification
- Kingdom: Animalia
- Phylum: Arthropoda
- Clade: Pancrustacea
- Class: Insecta
- Order: Coleoptera
- Suborder: Adephaga
- Family: Cicindelidae
- Genus: Ctenostoma
- Species: C. ebeninum

Binomial name
- Ctenostoma ebeninum Bates, 1868

Species of beetle

Ctenostoma ebeninum, the ebony comb-mouthed beetle, is a species of tiger beetle. This species is found in Bolivia, Brazil, French Guiana and Venezuela, where it inhabits low- to midland rainforests.
