= Ctenostoma schmalzi =

Scientific classification
- Kingdom: Animalia
- Phylum: Arthropoda
- Clade: Pancrustacea
- Class: Insecta
- Order: Coleoptera
- Suborder: Adephaga
- Family: Cicindelidae
- Genus: Ctenostoma
- Species: C. schmalzi

Binomial name
- Ctenostoma schmalzi W.Horn, 1898

Species of beetle

Ctenostoma schmalzi is a species of tiger beetle. This species is found in Paraguay and Brazil, where subspecies schmalzi inhabits the southern Atlantic forest and subspecies paraguayense is found in the gallery forests of the South American Campos ecosystem.

Adults are brachypterous.

== Subspecies ==
- Ctenostoma schmalzi schmalzi (Brazil) - Schmalz's comb-mouthed beetle
- Ctenostoma schmalzi paraguayense Brouerius van Nidek, 1956 (Paraguay) - Paraguayan small comb-mouthed beetle
