= Ctenostoma rugiferum =

Scientific classification
- Kingdom: Animalia
- Phylum: Arthropoda
- Clade: Pancrustacea
- Class: Insecta
- Order: Coleoptera
- Suborder: Adephaga
- Family: Cicindelidae
- Genus: Ctenostoma
- Species: C. rugiferum

Binomial name
- Ctenostoma rugiferum (W.Horn, 1895)

Synonyms
- Procephalus rugifer W.Horn, 1895

Species of beetle

Ctenostoma rugiferum is a species of tiger beetle. This species is found in Brazil, where it inhabits the Southern Atlantic Forest.

== Subspecies ==
- Ctenostoma rugiferum pseudoheydeni W.Horn, 1913 - false Heyden's comb-mouthed beetle
- Ctenostoma rugiferum rugiferum - wrinkled comb-mouthed beetle
