= Ctenostoma angustoobliquatum =

Scientific classification
- Kingdom: Animalia
- Phylum: Arthropoda
- Clade: Pancrustacea
- Class: Insecta
- Order: Coleoptera
- Suborder: Adephaga
- Family: Cicindelidae
- Genus: Ctenostoma
- Species: C. angustoobliquatum

Binomial name
- Ctenostoma angustoobliquatum W.Horn, 1925

Species of beetle

Ctenostoma angustoobliquatum, the narrowly-oblique comb-mouthed beetle, is a species of tiger beetle. This species is found in Costa Rica, where it inhabits forests ranging from the low- to the uplands.
