= Ctenostoma germaini =

Scientific classification
- Kingdom: Animalia
- Phylum: Arthropoda
- Clade: Pancrustacea
- Class: Insecta
- Order: Coleoptera
- Suborder: Adephaga
- Family: Cicindelidae
- Genus: Ctenostoma
- Species: C. germaini

Binomial name
- Ctenostoma germaini W.Horn, 1902

Species of beetle

Ctenostoma germaini, or Germain's comb-mouthed beetle, is a species of tiger beetle. This species is found in Bolivia, where it inhabits montane forests.

Adults have a dark-reddish or violet head and pronotum and the elytra are dark-green.
