= Ctenostoma tyrannum =

Scientific classification
- Kingdom: Animalia
- Phylum: Arthropoda
- Clade: Pancrustacea
- Class: Insecta
- Order: Coleoptera
- Suborder: Adephaga
- Family: Cicindelidae
- Genus: Ctenostoma
- Species: C. tyrannum

Binomial name
- Ctenostoma tyrannum (J.Thomson, 1859)

Synonyms
- Procephalus tyrannus J.Thomson, 1859

Species of beetle

Ctenostoma tyrannum, the master comb-mouthed beetle, is a species of tiger beetle. This species is found in Brazil, where it inhabits the southern Atlantic Forest.

Adults are brachypterous.
