= Ctenostoma minusculum =

Scientific classification
- Kingdom: Animalia
- Phylum: Arthropoda
- Clade: Pancrustacea
- Class: Insecta
- Order: Coleoptera
- Suborder: Adephaga
- Family: Cicindelidae
- Genus: Ctenostoma
- Species: C. minusculum

Binomial name
- Ctenostoma minusculum Naviaux, 2002

Species of beetle

Ctenostoma minusculum, the very small comb-mouthed beetle, is a species of tiger beetle. This species is found in Brazil, where it inhabits the southern Atlantic Forest.

Adults are small (5.7-5.9 mm) and brachypterous. The elytra are shining reddish-brown.
