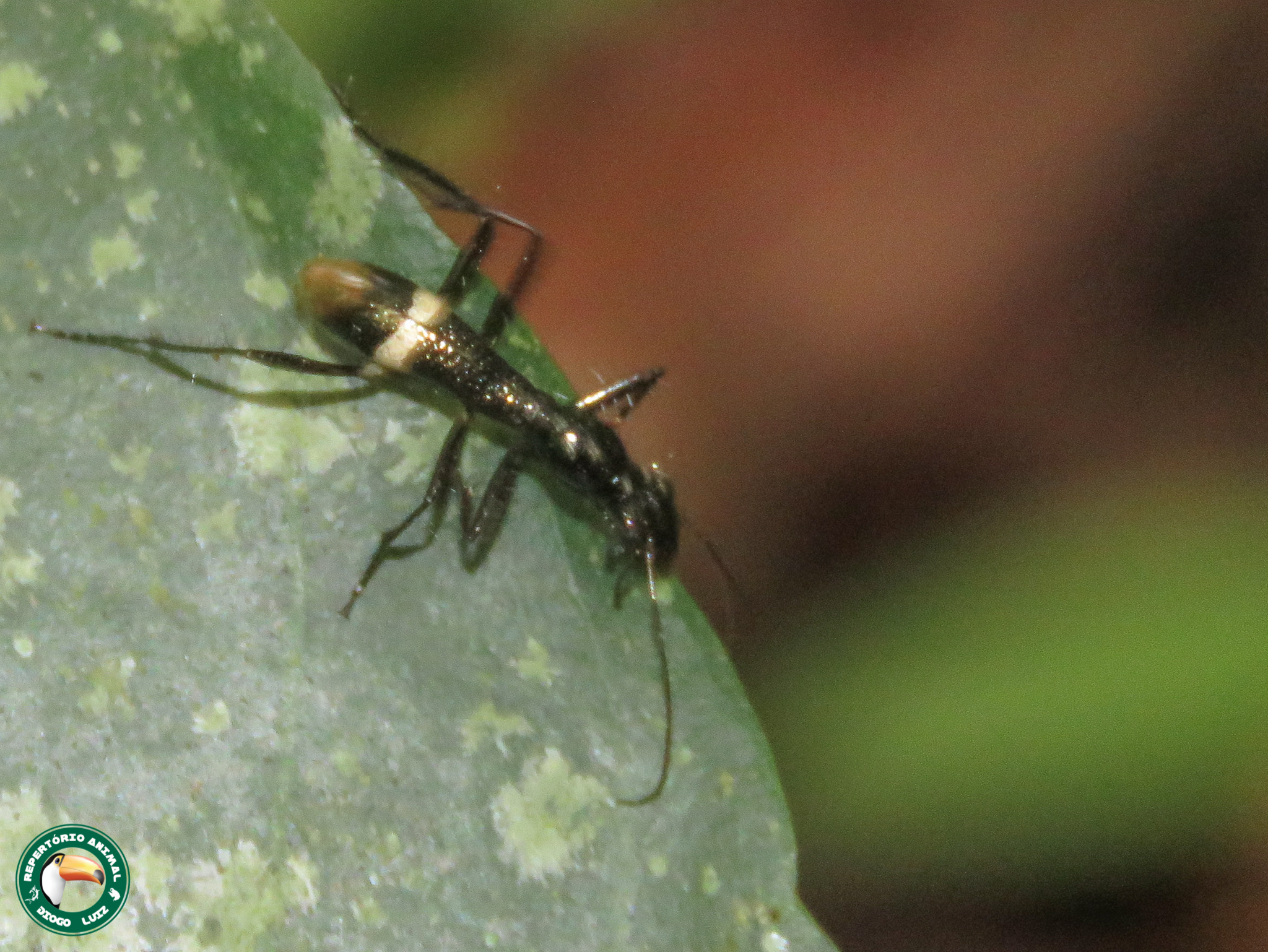
- Ctenostoma icheumoneum

Scientific classification
- Kingdom: Animalia
- Phylum: Arthropoda
- Clade: Pancrustacea
- Class: Insecta
- Order: Coleoptera
- Suborder: Adephaga
- Family: Cicindelidae
- Tribe: Ctenostomatini; Laporte, 1834

= Ctenostomatini =

Tribe of beetles

Ctenostomatini is a tribe of tiger beetles in the family Cicindelidae. There are at least two genera and more than 230 described species in Ctenostomatini.

== Genera ==
These two genera belong to the tribe Ctenostomatini:

- Ctenostoma Klug, 1821 (Central and South America)
- Pogonostoma Klug, 1835 (Madagascar)
