= Ctenostoma dormeri =

Scientific classification
- Kingdom: Animalia
- Phylum: Arthropoda
- Clade: Pancrustacea
- Class: Insecta
- Order: Coleoptera
- Suborder: Adephaga
- Family: Cicindelidae
- Genus: Ctenostoma
- Species: C. dormeri

Binomial name
- Ctenostoma dormeri W.Horn, 1898

Species of beetle

Ctenostoma dormeri, or Dormer’s comb-mouthed beetle, is a species of tiger beetle. This species is found from southern Colombia to northern Ecuador, where it is found in cloud forests on the slopes of the eastern Andes.

Adults are large in size (13.5–16 mm) and have a dark brown to shiny black colour.
