= Ctenostoma nigrum =

Scientific classification
- Kingdom: Animalia
- Phylum: Arthropoda
- Clade: Pancrustacea
- Class: Insecta
- Order: Coleoptera
- Suborder: Adephaga
- Family: Cicindelidae
- Genus: Ctenostoma
- Species: C. nigrum

Binomial name
- Ctenostoma nigrum Chaudoir, 1861

Species of beetle

Ctenostoma nigrum is a species of tiger beetle. This species is found in Bolivia, Colombia, Ecuador, Peru and Brazil, where it inhabits rainforests and cloud forests.

== Subspecies ==
- Ctenostoma nigrum nigrum (Bolivia, Colombia, Ecuador, Peru, Brazil) - black comb-mouthed beetle
- Ctenostoma nigrum lecourti Naviaux, 1998 (Bolivia, Peru) - Lecourt's comb-mouthed beetle
