= Ctenostoma wappesi =

Scientific classification
- Kingdom: Animalia
- Phylum: Arthropoda
- Clade: Pancrustacea
- Class: Insecta
- Order: Coleoptera
- Suborder: Adephaga
- Family: Cicindelidae
- Genus: Ctenostoma
- Species: C. wappesi

Binomial name
- Ctenostoma wappesi Naviaux, 1998

Species of beetle

Ctenostoma wappesi, or Wappes' comb-mouthed beetle, is a species of tiger beetle. This species is found in Panama, where it inhabits low- to midland rainforests and cloud forests.
