= Ctenostoma arnaudi =

Scientific classification
- Kingdom: Animalia
- Phylum: Arthropoda
- Clade: Pancrustacea
- Class: Insecta
- Order: Coleoptera
- Suborder: Adephaga
- Family: Cicindelidae
- Genus: Ctenostoma
- Species: C. arnaudi

Binomial name
- Ctenostoma arnaudi Naviaux, 1998

Species of beetle

Ctenostoma arnaudi, or Arnaud’s comb-mouthed beetle, is a species of tiger beetle. This species is found in Ecuador, where it is found in cloud forests on the eastern slopes of the north and central Andes.

Adults are large in size (14–15 mm) and have a shiny black to dark brown colour.
