= Ctenostoma touroulti =

Scientific classification
- Kingdom: Animalia
- Phylum: Arthropoda
- Clade: Pancrustacea
- Class: Insecta
- Order: Coleoptera
- Suborder: Adephaga
- Family: Cicindelidae
- Genus: Ctenostoma
- Species: C. touroulti

Binomial name
- Ctenostoma touroulti Dheurle, 2017

Species of beetle

Ctenostoma touroulti is a species of tiger beetle. This species is found in Ecuador.
