= Ctenostoma pusillum =

Scientific classification
- Kingdom: Animalia
- Phylum: Arthropoda
- Clade: Pancrustacea
- Class: Insecta
- Order: Coleoptera
- Suborder: Adephaga
- Family: Cicindelidae
- Genus: Ctenostoma
- Species: C. pusillum

Binomial name
- Ctenostoma pusillum Naviaux, 1998

Synonyms
- Ctenostoma minimum

Species of beetle

Ctenostoma pusillum is a species of tiger beetle. This species is found in Guyana, French Guiana and Ecuador. The habitat consists of lowland forests.

Adults are very small in size (5.5-6.5 mm) and have a shiny black head and thorax, while the elytra are dark brown.

== Subspecies ==
- Ctenostoma pusillum pusillum (Guyana, French Guiana) - tiny comb-mouthed beetle
- Ctenostoma pusillum minimum Navaiux, 1998 (Ecuador) - tiny-tiny comb-mouthed beetle
