= Ctenostoma insigne =

Scientific classification
- Kingdom: Animalia
- Phylum: Arthropoda
- Clade: Pancrustacea
- Class: Insecta
- Order: Coleoptera
- Suborder: Adephaga
- Family: Cicindelidae
- Genus: Ctenostoma
- Species: C. insigne

Binomial name
- Ctenostoma insigne Chaudoir, 1861

Species of beetle

Ctenostoma insigne, the marked comb-mouthed beetle, is a species of tiger beetle. This species is found in Peru and Brazil, where it inhabits lowland rainforests.
