= Ctenostoma davidsoni =

Scientific classification
- Kingdom: Animalia
- Phylum: Arthropoda
- Clade: Pancrustacea
- Class: Insecta
- Order: Coleoptera
- Suborder: Adephaga
- Family: Cicindelidae
- Genus: Ctenostoma
- Species: C. davidsoni

Binomial name
- Ctenostoma davidsoni Naviaux, 1998

Species of beetle

Ctenostoma davidsoni, Davidson's comb-mouthed beetle, is a species of tiger beetle. This species is found in Costa Rica, where it inhabits rainforests and tropical dry forests at low to medium altitudes.
