= Ctenostoma agnatum =

Scientific classification
- Kingdom: Animalia
- Phylum: Arthropoda
- Clade: Pancrustacea
- Class: Insecta
- Order: Coleoptera
- Suborder: Adephaga
- Family: Cicindelidae
- Genus: Ctenostoma
- Species: C. agnatum

Binomial name
- Ctenostoma agnatum Chaudoir, 1861

Species of beetle

Ctenostoma agnatum is a species of tiger beetle. This species is found in Ecuador, Peru and western Brazil. Its habitat consists of primary forests.

Adults are medium-sized (10.5–11 mm). They are ant-like, with a shiny dark brown to black head and pronotum. The elytra are black with yellow patches and bands.

Adults are brachypterous. When in danger, adults roll themselves up and let themselves fall to the ground, where they lie still.

== Subspecies ==
- Ctenostoma agnatum agnatum (Ecuador, Peru, Brazil) - small-jawed comb-mouthed beetle
- Ctenostoma agnatum fuscum Naviaux, 1998 (Peru) - somber comb-mouthed beetle
