= Ctenostoma cassolai =

Scientific classification
- Kingdom: Animalia
- Phylum: Arthropoda
- Clade: Pancrustacea
- Class: Insecta
- Order: Coleoptera
- Suborder: Adephaga
- Family: Cicindelidae
- Genus: Ctenostoma
- Species: C. cassolai

Binomial name
- Ctenostoma cassolai Naviaux, 1998

Species of beetle

Ctenostoma cassolai, or Cassola's comb-mouthed beetle, is a species of tiger beetle. This species is found in Ecuador, where it inhabits cloud forests in the west-central part of the country.

Adults are medium-sized (9.5-10.5 mm) and are shiny black in colour.
