= Ctenostoma metallicum =

Scientific classification
- Kingdom: Animalia
- Phylum: Arthropoda
- Clade: Pancrustacea
- Class: Insecta
- Order: Coleoptera
- Suborder: Adephaga
- Family: Cicindelidae
- Genus: Ctenostoma
- Species: C. metallicum

Binomial name
- Ctenostoma metallicum (Laporte, 1834)

Synonyms
- Procephalus metallicus Laporte, 1834

Species of beetle

Ctenostoma metallicum, the metallic comb-mouthed beetle, is a species of tiger beetle. This species is found in Guyana and French Guiana.
