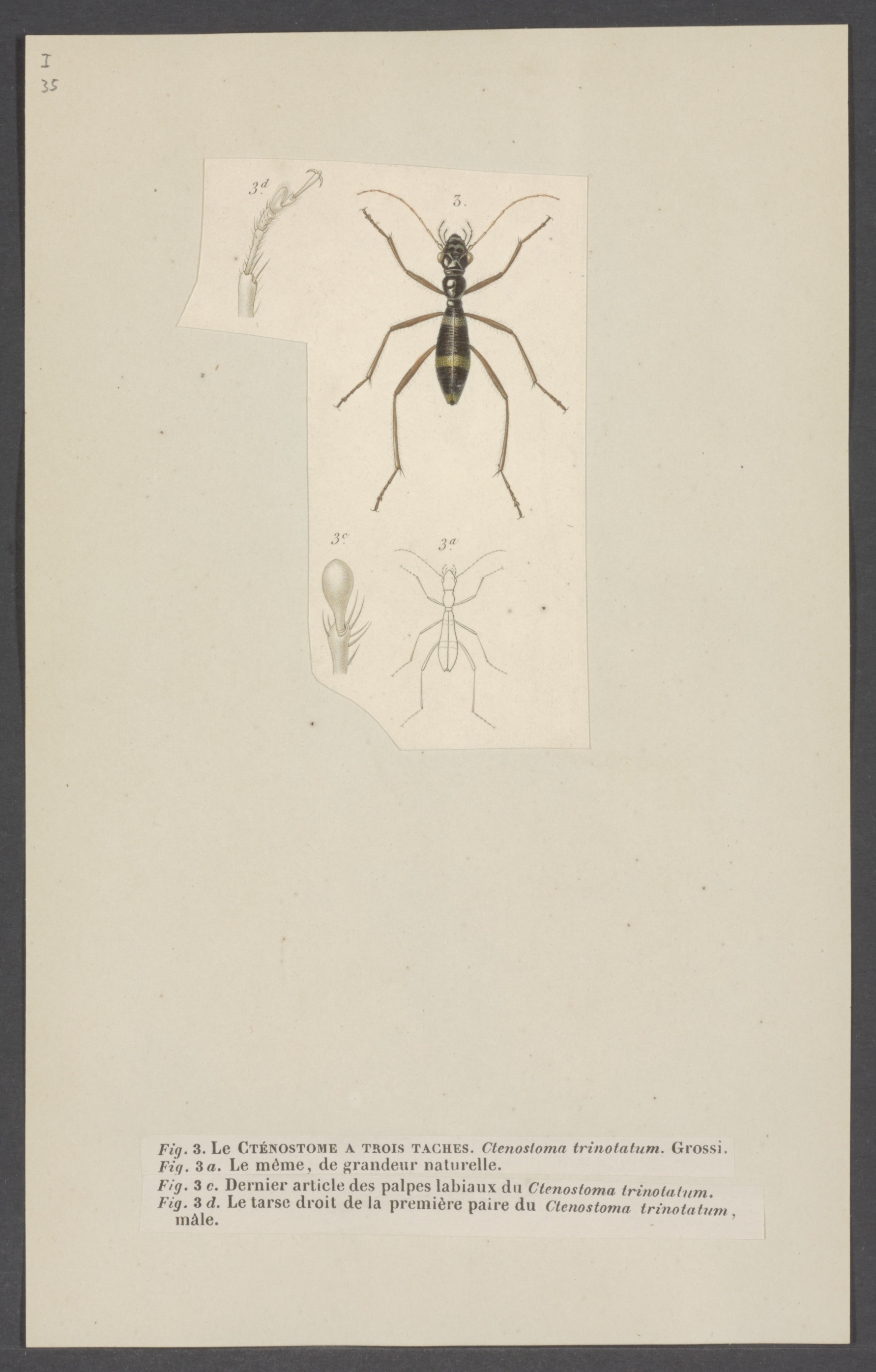

Scientific classification
- Kingdom: Animalia
- Phylum: Arthropoda
- Clade: Pancrustacea
- Class: Insecta
- Order: Coleoptera
- Suborder: Adephaga
- Family: Cicindelidae
- Genus: Ctenostoma
- Species: C. trinotatum

Binomial name
- Ctenostoma trinotatum (Fischer von Waldheim, 1821)

Synonyms
- Caris trinotata Fischer von Waldheim, 1821; Ctenostoma fischeri Chaudoir, 1848; Caris fasciata Fischer von Waldheim, 1821

= Ctenostoma trinotatum =

Species of beetle

Ctenostoma trinotatum, the three-spotted comb-mouthed beetle, is a species of tiger beetle. This species is found in Brazil, where it inhabits the southern Atlantic Forest.

The adults are brachypterous.
