= Ctenostoma chaudoiri =

Scientific classification
- Kingdom: Animalia
- Phylum: Arthropoda
- Clade: Pancrustacea
- Class: Insecta
- Order: Coleoptera
- Suborder: Adephaga
- Family: Cicindelidae
- Genus: Ctenostoma
- Species: C. chaudoiri

Binomial name
- Ctenostoma chaudoiri (W.Horn, 1895)

Synonyms
- Procephalus chaudoiri W.Horn, 1895

Species of beetle

Ctenostoma chaudoiri, or Chaudoir's comb-mouthed beetle, is a species of tiger beetle. This species is found in Brazil, where it inhabits the southern Atlantic Forest.

== Subspecies ==
- Ctenostoma chaudoiri chaudoiri
- Ctenostoma chaudoiri gounellei W.Horn, 1898
