= Ctenostoma longipalpe =

Scientific classification
- Kingdom: Animalia
- Phylum: Arthropoda
- Clade: Pancrustacea
- Class: Insecta
- Order: Coleoptera
- Suborder: Adephaga
- Family: Cicindelidae
- Genus: Ctenostoma
- Species: C. longipalpe

Binomial name
- Ctenostoma longipalpe Naviaux, 1998

Species of beetle

Ctenostoma longipalpe, the long-palpi comb-mouthed beetle, is a species of tiger beetle. This species is found in Colombia, Panama and Costa Rica, where it inhabits low- to upland rainforests and cloud forests.
