= Ctenostoma zonatum =

Scientific classification
- Kingdom: Animalia
- Phylum: Arthropoda
- Clade: Pancrustacea
- Class: Insecta
- Order: Coleoptera
- Suborder: Adephaga
- Family: Cicindelidae
- Genus: Ctenostoma
- Species: C. zonatum

Binomial name
- Ctenostoma zonatum Chaudoir, 1861

Species of beetle

Ctenostoma zonatum, the girdled comb-mouthed beetle, is a species of tiger beetle. This species is found in Brazil, where it inhabits lowland rainforests.

Adults are brachypterous.
