= Ctenostoma maculicorne =

Scientific classification
- Kingdom: Animalia
- Phylum: Arthropoda
- Clade: Pancrustacea
- Class: Insecta
- Order: Coleoptera
- Suborder: Adephaga
- Family: Cicindelidae
- Genus: Ctenostoma
- Species: C. maculicorne

Binomial name
- Ctenostoma maculicorne (Chevrolat, 1856)

Synonyms
- Procephalus maculicornis Chevrolat, 1856; Ctenostoma sigma Bates, 1878

Species of beetle

Ctenostoma maculicorne, the spotted-horn comb-mouthed beetle, is a species of tiger beetle. This species is found in Colombia, Panama, Costa Rica, Nicaragua, El Salvador, Honduras, Belize, Guatemala and Mexico, where it inhabits low- to midland rainforests and cloud forests.
