= Ctenostoma onorei =

Scientific classification
- Kingdom: Animalia
- Phylum: Arthropoda
- Clade: Pancrustacea
- Class: Insecta
- Order: Coleoptera
- Suborder: Adephaga
- Family: Cicindelidae
- Genus: Ctenostoma
- Species: C. onorei

Binomial name
- Ctenostoma onorei Naviaux, 1998

Species of beetle

Ctenostoma onorei is a species of tiger beetle. This species is found in Colombia and Ecuador, where it is found in lowland forests.

Adults are large in size (14–15 mm) and have a shiny black to dark brown colour.

== Subspecies ==
- Ctenostoma onorei onorei (Ecuador) - Onore's comb-mouthed beetle
- Ctenostoma onorei colombiense Naviaux, 1998 (western Colombia) - Colombian comb-mouthed beetle
