= Ctenostoma ornatum =

Scientific classification
- Kingdom: Animalia
- Phylum: Arthropoda
- Clade: Pancrustacea
- Class: Insecta
- Order: Coleoptera
- Suborder: Adephaga
- Family: Cicindelidae
- Genus: Ctenostoma
- Species: C. ornatum

Binomial name
- Ctenostoma ornatum Klug, 1834

Species of beetle

Ctenostoma ornatum is a species of tiger beetle. This species is found in Brazil, where it inhabits the southern Atlantic Forest.

== Subspecies ==
- Ctenostoma ornatum ornatum (Brazil) - ornate comb-mouthed beetle
- Ctenostoma ornatum werneri Naviaux, 1998 (Brazil) - Werner's comb-mouthed beetle
