= Ctenostoma subtilesculptum =

Scientific classification
- Kingdom: Animalia
- Phylum: Arthropoda
- Clade: Pancrustacea
- Class: Insecta
- Order: Coleoptera
- Suborder: Adephaga
- Family: Cicindelidae
- Genus: Ctenostoma
- Species: C. subtilesculptum

Binomial name
- Ctenostoma subtilesculptum W.Horn, 1913

Species of beetle

Ctenostoma subtilesculptum, the subtly-sculpted comb-mouthed beetle, is a species of tiger beetle. This species is found in Bolivia and Brazil, where it inhabits tropical dry forests and cerrados.
