= Ctenostoma regium =

Scientific classification
- Kingdom: Animalia
- Phylum: Arthropoda
- Clade: Pancrustacea
- Class: Insecta
- Order: Coleoptera
- Suborder: Adephaga
- Family: Cicindelidae
- Genus: Ctenostoma
- Species: C. regium

Binomial name
- Ctenostoma regium Naviaux, 1998

Species of beetle

Ctenostoma regium, the regal comb-mouthed beetle, is a species of tiger beetle. This species is found in Ecuador, Peru and Brazil.

Adults are large in size (16–18 mm) and are almost entirely black, except for some yellow areas on the antennae.

Adults are thought to mimic the stinging ants of the Paraponera genus. They not only resemble these ants, but also have similar behaviour.
