= Ctenostoma dalensi =

Scientific classification
- Kingdom: Animalia
- Phylum: Arthropoda
- Clade: Pancrustacea
- Class: Insecta
- Order: Coleoptera
- Suborder: Adephaga
- Family: Cicindelidae
- Genus: Ctenostoma
- Species: C. dalensi

Binomial name
- Ctenostoma dalensi Cassola, 2011

Species of beetle

Ctenostoma dalensi is a species of tiger beetle. This species is found in French Guiana.

Adults have a length of about 7.5 mm. The pronotum is black, almost smooth and shiny. The pattern of the elytra consists of a pale yellow fascia and a yellowish apical spot.

== Etymology ==
The species is named in honour of Pierre-Henri Dalens, who was the first to collect this species.
