= Ctenostoma antonkozlovi =

Scientific classification
- Kingdom: Animalia
- Phylum: Arthropoda
- Clade: Pancrustacea
- Class: Insecta
- Order: Coleoptera
- Suborder: Adephaga
- Family: Cicindelidae
- Genus: Ctenostoma
- Species: C. antonkozlovi

Binomial name
- Ctenostoma antonkozlovi Sciaky, 2018

Species of beetle

Ctenostoma antonkozlovi is a species of tiger beetle. This species is found in Bolivia.

Adults are medium-sized (10.5 mm) with dark-blue elytra.

== Etymology ==
The species is named for the Russian entomologist Anton Olegovich Kozlov.
