= Ctenostoma bahiaense =

Scientific classification
- Kingdom: Animalia
- Phylum: Arthropoda
- Clade: Pancrustacea
- Class: Insecta
- Order: Coleoptera
- Suborder: Adephaga
- Family: Cicindelidae
- Genus: Ctenostoma
- Species: C. bahiaense

Binomial name
- Ctenostoma bahiaense Naviaux, 1998

Species of beetle

Ctenostoma bahiaense, the Bahia comb-mouthed beetle, is a species of tiger beetle. This species is found in Brazil, where it inhabits the southern Atlantic Forest.
