= Ctenostoma formicarium =

Scientific classification
- Kingdom: Animalia
- Phylum: Arthropoda
- Clade: Pancrustacea
- Class: Insecta
- Order: Coleoptera
- Suborder: Adephaga
- Family: Cicindelidae
- Genus: Ctenostoma
- Species: C. formicarium

Binomial name
- Ctenostoma formicarium (Fabricius, 1801)

Synonyms
- Collyris formicarium Fabricius, 1801; Ctenostoma rectofasciatum W.Horn, 1913; Ctenostoma jacquieri Dejean, 1831

Species of beetle

Ctenostoma formicarium, the ant-like comb-mouthed beetle, is a species of tiger beetle. This species is found in Guyana, Surinam, French Guiana, Peru and Brazil, where it inhabits lowland rainforests.
