= Ctenostoma plicaticolle =

Scientific classification
- Kingdom: Animalia
- Phylum: Arthropoda
- Clade: Pancrustacea
- Class: Insecta
- Order: Coleoptera
- Suborder: Adephaga
- Family: Cicindelidae
- Genus: Ctenostoma
- Species: C. plicaticolle

Binomial name
- Ctenostoma plicaticolle W.Horn, 1911

Species of beetle

Ctenostoma plicaticolle, the pleated-collar comb-mouthed beetle, is a species of tiger beetle. This species is found in Peru, where it inhabits lowland rainforests.

Adults have a size of about 11 mm and are brachypterous.
