= Ctenostoma pygmaeum =

Scientific classification
- Kingdom: Animalia
- Phylum: Arthropoda
- Clade: Pancrustacea
- Class: Insecta
- Order: Coleoptera
- Suborder: Adephaga
- Family: Cicindelidae
- Genus: Ctenostoma
- Species: C. pygmaeum

Binomial name
- Ctenostoma pygmaeum (Lacordaire, 1843)

Synonyms
- Myrmecilla pygmaea Lacordaire, 1843

Species of beetle

Ctenostoma pygmaeum is a species of tiger beetle. This species is found in Brazil, where it inhabits the Southern Atlantic Forest.

Adults are brachypterous.

== Subspecies ==
- Ctenostoma pygmaeum pygmaeum - pygmy comb-mouthed beetle
- Ctenostoma pygmaeum concolor Naviaux, 1998 - uniform small comb-mouthed beetle
