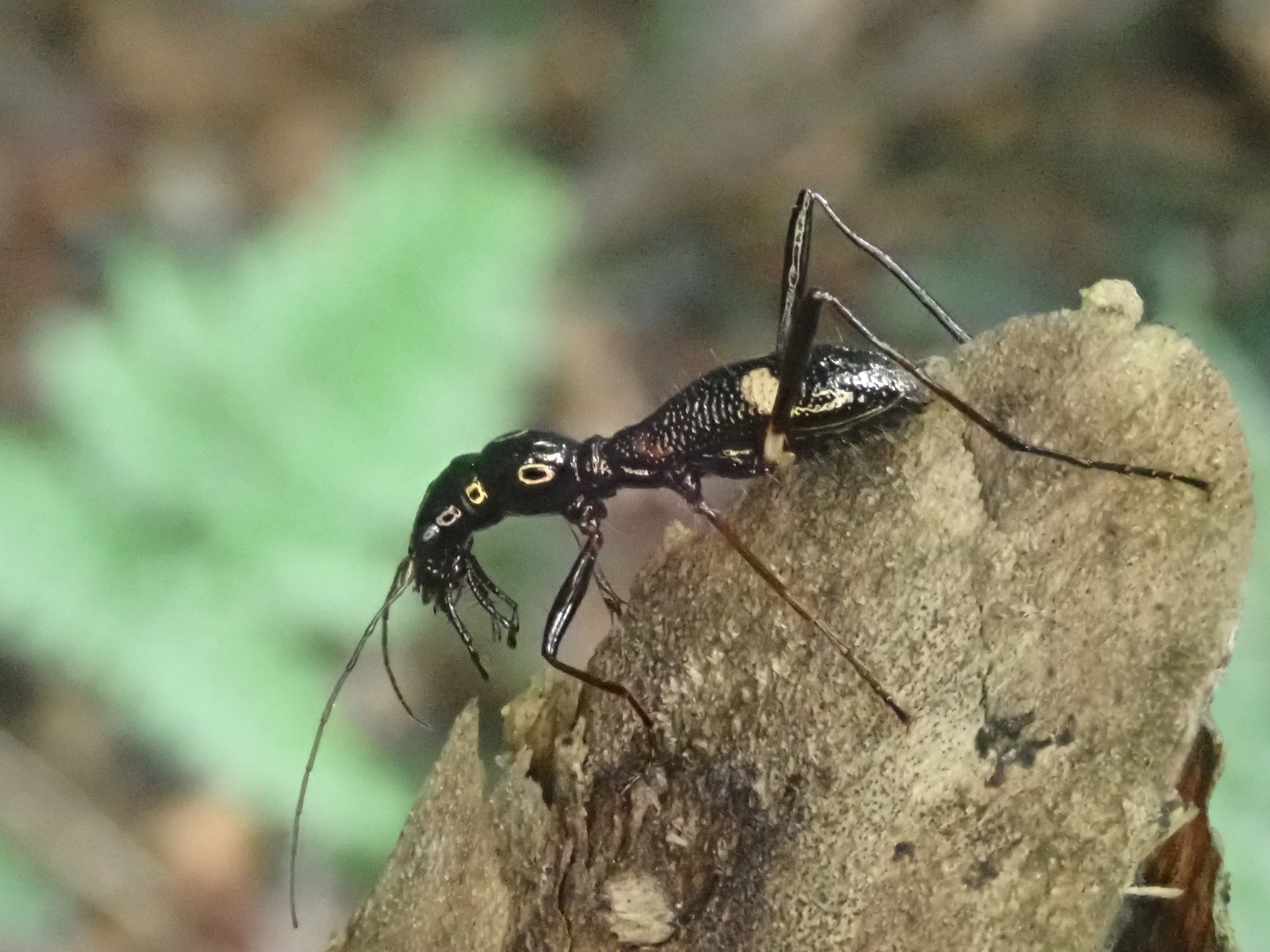
- Ctenostoma, Brazil

Scientific classification
- Kingdom: Animalia
- Phylum: Arthropoda
- Clade: Pancrustacea
- Class: Insecta
- Order: Coleoptera
- Suborder: Adephaga
- Family: Cicindelidae
- Tribe: Ctenostomatini
- Genus: Ctenostoma; Klug, 1821

Subgenera
- Ctenostoma Klug, 1821; Euctenostoma Naviaux, 1998; Microprocephalus Naviaux, 1998; Myrmecilla Lacordaire, 1843; Naviauxiana Erwin, 2007; Neoprocephalus Naviaux, 1998; Paractenostoma Naviaux, 1998; Salvioides Naviaux, 1998

Synonyms
- Caris Fischer de Waldheim, 1821; Ctenosthoma Sturm, 1826; Euctenostoma Naviaux, 1998; Microprocephalus Naviaux, 1998; Myrmecilla Lacordaire, 1843; Myrmecocilla Tilesius, 1850; Neoprocephalus Naviaux, 1998; Paractenostoma Naviaux, 1998; Procephalus Laporte, 1834; Salvioides Naviaux, 1998

= Ctenostoma =

Genus of beetles

Ctenostoma is a genus in the beetle family Cicindelidae. There are more than 120 described species in the genus Ctenostoma.

== Species ==
These 122 species belong to the genus Ctenostoma:

- Ctenostoma
  - Ctenostoma acciavattii Naviaux, 1998 (Brazil)
  - Ctenostoma bahiaense Naviaux, 1998 (Brazil)
  - Ctenostoma batesii Chaudoir, 1861 (Ecuador and Brazil)
  - Ctenostoma chaudoiri (W.Horn, 1895) (Brazil)
  - Ctenostoma formicarium (Fabricius, 1801) (South America)
  - Ctenostoma guyanense Naviaux, 1998 (French Guiana)
  - Ctenostoma heydeni W.Horn, 1894 (Brazil)
  - Ctenostoma jekelii Chevrolat, 1858 (French Guiana and Brazil)
  - Ctenostoma quechua Naviaux & Brzoska, 2009 (Bolivia)
  - Ctenostoma rugicolle W.Horn, 1904 (Ecuador, Peru, and Brazil)
  - Ctenostoma rugiferum (W.Horn, 1895) (Brazil)
  - Ctenostoma succinctum (Laporte, 1834) (South America)
  - Ctenostoma transversum Naviaux, 1998 (Bolivia and Brazil)
- Euctenostoma Naviaux, 1998
  - Ctenostoma bifasciatum Dejean, 1831 (Brazil)
  - Ctenostoma bondari W.Horn, 1938 (Brazil)
  - Ctenostoma eburatum Bates, 1872 (Brazil)
  - Ctenostoma ferum Naviaux, 2005 (Brazil)
  - Ctenostoma fryi Chaudoir, 1865 (Brazil)
  - Ctenostoma inca Naviaux, 1998 (Ecuador and Peru)
  - Ctenostoma klugeanum W.Horn, 1915 (Brazil)
  - Ctenostoma luctuosum Chaudoir, 1861 (French Guiana, Peru, and Brazil)
  - Ctenostoma magnum Naviaux, 1998 (Peru)
  - Ctenostoma monnei Naviaux, 2002 (Brazil)
  - Ctenostoma rapillyi Naviaux, 1998 (Brazil)
  - Ctenostoma regium Naviaux, 1998 (Ecuador, Peru, and Brazil)
  - Ctenostoma rugosum Klug, 1824 (Brazil)
  - Ctenostoma sahlbergii Chaudoir, 1861 (Brazil)
  - Ctenostoma sumlini Naviaux, 1998 (Peru)
  - Ctenostoma trinotatum (Fischer von Waldheim, 1821) (Brazil)
  - Ctenostoma tyrannum (J.Thomson, 1859) (Brazil)
  - Ctenostoma wiesneri Naviaux, 1998 (Brazil)
- Microprocephalus Naviaux, 1998
  - Ctenostoma brevilabre W.Horn, 1931 (Brazil)
  - Ctenostoma pusillum Naviaux, 1998 (Guyana and French Guiana)
- Myrmecilla Lacordaire, 1843
  - Ctenostoma abbreviatum Naviaux, 1998 (Brazil)
  - Ctenostoma agnatum Chaudoir, 1861 (Ecuador, Peru, and Brazil)
  - Ctenostoma albofasciatum Chaudoir, 1850 (Brazil)
  - Ctenostoma asperulum Bates, 1868 (Brazil)
  - Ctenostoma bicristatum Chaudoir, 1861 (Brazil)
  - Ctenostoma brevicorne W.Horn, 1898 (Venezuela)
  - Ctenostoma breviusculum Mannerheim, 1837 (Brazil)
  - Ctenostoma compactum Naviaux, 1998 (Peru)
  - Ctenostoma coracinum Naviaux, 1998 (Brazil)
  - Ctenostoma crucifrons W.Horn, 1911 (Peru)
  - Ctenostoma dalensi Cassola, 2011 (French Guiana)
  - Ctenostoma dentifrons W.Horn, 1901 (Brazil)
  - Ctenostoma dokhturowi W.Horn, 1898 (Brazil)
  - Ctenostoma flexuosum Naviaux, 1998 (Brazil)
  - Ctenostoma gautardi Chaudoir, 1869 (Brazil)
  - Ctenostoma globifrons W.Horn, 1898 (Brazil)
  - Ctenostoma hirsutum W.Horn, 1892 (Brazil)
  - Ctenostoma ichneumoneum Dejean, 1826 (Paraguay and Brazil)
  - Ctenostoma infimum Naviaux, 1998 (Brazil)
  - Ctenostoma luteum Naviaux, 1998 (Peru)
  - Ctenostoma macilentum Klug, 1834 (Brazil)
  - Ctenostoma minusculum Naviaux, 2002 (Brazil)
  - Ctenostoma modicum Naviaux, 1998 (Brazil)
  - Ctenostoma obliquatum Chaudoir, 1861 (Bolivia, Peru, and Brazil)
  - Ctenostoma oblitum Chaudoir, 1865 (Brazil)
  - Ctenostoma parvulum Naviaux, 1998 (Brazil)
  - Ctenostoma plicaticolle W.Horn, 1911 (Peru)
  - Ctenostoma pygmaeum (Lacordaire, 1843) (Brazil)
  - Ctenostoma rivalieri Naviaux, 1998 (Brazil)
  - Ctenostoma schaumi W.Horn, 1895 (Brazil)
  - Ctenostoma schmalzi W.Horn, 1898 (Paraguay and Brazil)
  - Ctenostoma unifasciatum Dejean, 1831 (Brazil)
  - Ctenostoma vicinum Naviaux, 1998 (Brazil)
  - Ctenostoma zerchei Naviaux, 1998 (Brazil)
  - Ctenostoma zonatum Chaudoir, 1861 (Brazil)
- Naviauxiana Erwin, 2007
  - Ctenostoma aeneum Naviaux, 1998 (Panama, Costa Rica, and Nicaragua)
  - Ctenostoma bettinae Gebert & Naviaux, 2014 (Venezuela)
  - Ctenostoma arnaudi Naviaux, 1998 (Ecuador)
  - Ctenostoma cayennense Naviaux, 1998 (French Guiana)
  - Ctenostoma crudelum Naviaux & Schüle, 2008 (Colombia)
  - Ctenostoma dormeri W.Horn, 1898 (Colombia and Ecuador)
  - Ctenostoma durantoni Naviaux, 1998 (French Guiana and Brazil)
  - Ctenostoma ebeninum Bates, 1868 (Bolivia and Brazil)
  - Ctenostoma ecuadorense Naviaux, 1998 (Colombia and Ecuador)
  - Ctenostoma erwini Naviaux, 1998 (Panama)
  - Ctenostoma insigne Chaudoir, 1861 (Peru and Brazil)
  - Ctenostoma longipalpe Naviaux, 1998 (Colombia, Panama, and Costa Rica)
  - Ctenostoma maculosum Naviaux, 1998 (Colombia)
  - Ctenostoma metallicum (Laporte, 1834) (Guyana and French Guiana)
  - Ctenostoma nigrum Chaudoir, 1861 (South America)
  - Ctenostoma onorei Naviaux, 1998 (Colombia and Ecuador)
  - Ctenostoma ornatum Klug, 1834 (Brazil)
  - Ctenostoma panamense Naviaux, 2005 (Panama)
  - Ctenostoma pearsoni Naviaux, 1998 (Panama)
  - Ctenostoma sallei Chaudoir, 1861 (Venezuela)
  - Ctenostoma simile Naviaux, 1998 (Panama and Costa Rica)
  - Ctenostoma spinosum Naviaux, 1998 (Panama)
  - Ctenostoma subtilesculptum W.Horn, 1913 (Bolivia and Brazil)
  - Ctenostoma trinidadense Naviaux & Brzoska, 2009 (Lesser Antilles)
- Neoprocephalus Naviaux, 1998
  - Ctenostoma angustoobliquatum W.Horn, 1925 (Costa Rica)
  - Ctenostoma antonkozlovi Sciaky, 2018 (Bolivia)
  - Ctenostoma brendelli Naviaux, 1998 (Panama and Costa Rica)
  - Ctenostoma brulei Cassola, 2011 (French Guiana)
  - Ctenostoma brunneum Naviaux, 1998 (Ecuador)
  - Ctenostoma cassolai Naviaux, 1998 (Ecuador)
  - Ctenostoma cylindratum Naviaux, 1998 (Peru and Brazil)
  - Ctenostoma davidsoni Naviaux, 1998 (Costa Rica)
  - Ctenostoma deuvei Naviaux, 1998 (Peru)
  - Ctenostoma germaini W.Horn, 1902 (Bolivia)
  - Ctenostoma guatemalense Brouerius van Nidek, 1960 (Guatemala)
  - Ctenostoma hovorei Naviaux & Brzoska, 2005 (Costa Rica)
  - Ctenostoma ibidion C.A.Dohrn, 1880 (Venezuela, Ecuador, and Costa Rica)
  - Ctenostoma immaculatum (W.Horn, 1925) (Ecuador)
  - Ctenostoma intermedium Naviaux, 1998 (Venezuela)
  - Ctenostoma johnsoni Naviaux, 1998 (Ecuador)
  - Ctenostoma laeticolor Bates, 1878 (Panama, Costa Rica, and Nicaragua)
  - Ctenostoma landolti Steinheil, 1877 (Brazil)
  - Ctenostoma maculicorne (Chevrolat, 1856) (Central and South America)
  - Ctenostoma nitidum Naviaux, 1998 (Bolivia and Peru)
  - Ctenostoma touroulti Dheurle, 2017 (Ecuador)
  - Ctenostoma tumidum Naviaux, 1998 (Costa Rica)
  - Ctenostoma turnbowi Naviaux, 1998 (Panama)
  - Ctenostoma vairai Cassola, 2001 (Ecuador)
  - Ctenostoma wappesi Naviaux, 1998 (Panama)
- Paractenostoma Naviaux, 1998
  - Ctenostoma corculum Bates, 1868 (Brazil)
  - Ctenostoma parallelum Naviaux, 1998 (Brazil)
  - Ctenostoma simpliceps W.Horn, 1900 (Brazil)
- Salvioides Naviaux, 1998
  - Ctenostoma zikani W.Horn, 1911 (Brazil)
