= Ctenostoma vairai =

Scientific classification
- Kingdom: Animalia
- Phylum: Arthropoda
- Clade: Pancrustacea
- Class: Insecta
- Order: Coleoptera
- Suborder: Adephaga
- Family: Cicindelidae
- Genus: Ctenostoma
- Species: C. vairai

Binomial name
- Ctenostoma vairai Cassola, 2001

Species of beetle

Ctenostoma vairai, or Vaira's comb-mouthed beetle, is a species of tiger beetle. This species is found in Ecuador, where it inhabits lower montane rainforests.

Adult females have a length of about 10.5 mm (0.41 in) and are black to pitchy-black.

== Etymology ==
The species is named in honour of Riccardo Vaira who collected the holotype.
