= Ctenostoma bettinae =

Scientific classification
- Kingdom: Animalia
- Phylum: Arthropoda
- Clade: Pancrustacea
- Class: Insecta
- Order: Coleoptera
- Suborder: Adephaga
- Family: Cicindelidae
- Genus: Ctenostoma
- Species: C. bettinae

Binomial name
- Ctenostoma bettinae Gebert & Naviaux, 2014

Species of beetle

Ctenostoma bettinae is a species of tiger beetle. This species is found in Venezuela.

Adults have a length of about 11.7 mm.
