= Ctenostoma heydeni =

Scientific classification
- Kingdom: Animalia
- Phylum: Arthropoda
- Clade: Pancrustacea
- Class: Insecta
- Order: Coleoptera
- Suborder: Adephaga
- Family: Cicindelidae
- Genus: Ctenostoma
- Species: C. heydeni

Binomial name
- Ctenostoma heydeni W.Horn, 1894

Species of beetle

Ctenostoma heydeni, or Heyden's comb-mouthed beetle, is a species of tiger beetle. This species is found in Brazil.
