= Ctenostoma brevilabre =

Scientific classification
- Kingdom: Animalia
- Phylum: Arthropoda
- Clade: Pancrustacea
- Class: Insecta
- Order: Coleoptera
- Suborder: Adephaga
- Family: Cicindelidae
- Genus: Ctenostoma
- Species: C. brevilabre

Binomial name
- Ctenostoma brevilabre W.Horn, 1931

Species of beetle

Ctenostoma brevilabre, the short-lipped comb-mouthed beetle, is a species of tiger beetle. This species is found in Brazil, where it inhabits the southern Atlantic Forest.

Adults are small (about 7 mm) and have a brownish colour.
