= Ctenostoma brevicorne =

Scientific classification
- Kingdom: Animalia
- Phylum: Arthropoda
- Clade: Pancrustacea
- Class: Insecta
- Order: Coleoptera
- Suborder: Adephaga
- Family: Cicindelidae
- Genus: Ctenostoma
- Species: C. brevicorne

Binomial name
- Ctenostoma brevicorne W. Horn, 1898

Species of beetle

Ctenostoma brevicorne, the short-horned comb-mouthed beetle, is a species of tiger beetle. This species is found in Venezuela, where it inhabits moist tropical forests.

Larvae have been recorded from burrows in twigs and small branches.
