= Ctenostoma inca =

Scientific classification
- Kingdom: Animalia
- Phylum: Arthropoda
- Clade: Pancrustacea
- Class: Insecta
- Order: Coleoptera
- Suborder: Adephaga
- Family: Cicindelidae
- Genus: Ctenostoma
- Species: C. inca

Binomial name
- Ctenostoma inca Naviaux, 1998

Species of beetle

Ctenostoma inca, the Inca comb-mouthed beetle, is a species of tiger beetle. This species is found in Peru, where it inhabits lowland to mountainous rainforests and cloud forests.
