= Ctenostoma guatemalense =

Scientific classification
- Kingdom: Animalia
- Phylum: Arthropoda
- Clade: Pancrustacea
- Class: Insecta
- Order: Coleoptera
- Suborder: Adephaga
- Family: Cicindelidae
- Genus: Ctenostoma
- Species: C. guatemalense

Binomial name
- Ctenostoma guatemalense Brouerius van Nidek, 1960

Species of beetle

Ctenostoma guatemalense, the Guatemalan comb-mouthed beetle, is a species of tiger beetle. This species is found in Guatemala, where it inhabits lower montane rainforests.
