= Ctenostoma brulei =

Scientific classification
- Kingdom: Animalia
- Phylum: Arthropoda
- Clade: Pancrustacea
- Class: Insecta
- Order: Coleoptera
- Suborder: Adephaga
- Family: Cicindelidae
- Genus: Ctenostoma
- Species: C. brulei

Binomial name
- Ctenostoma brulei Cassola, 2011

Species of beetle

Ctenostoma brulei is a species of tiger beetle. This species is found in French Guiana.

Adults have a length of about 15 mm. The pronotum is black, smooth and shiny. The pattern of the elytra consists of a sigmoid yellow fascia.

== Etymology ==
The species is named in honour of Stéphane Brûlé who sent the author specimens of the new species.
