= Ctenostoma cayennense =

Scientific classification
- Kingdom: Animalia
- Phylum: Arthropoda
- Clade: Pancrustacea
- Class: Insecta
- Order: Coleoptera
- Suborder: Adephaga
- Family: Cicindelidae
- Genus: Ctenostoma
- Species: C. cayennense

Binomial name
- Ctenostoma cayennense Naviaux, 1998

Species of beetle

Ctenostoma cayennense, the Cayenne comb-mouthed beetle, is a species of tiger beetle. This species is found in French Guiana, where it inhabits low-altitude rainforests.
