= Ctenostoma ecuadorense =

Scientific classification
- Kingdom: Animalia
- Phylum: Arthropoda
- Clade: Pancrustacea
- Class: Insecta
- Order: Coleoptera
- Suborder: Adephaga
- Family: Cicindelidae
- Genus: Ctenostoma
- Species: C. ecuadorense

Binomial name
- Ctenostoma ecuadorense Naviaux, 1998

Species of beetle

Ctenostoma ecuadorense, the Ecuadorian comb-mouthed beetle, is a species of tiger beetle. This species is found in western Colombia and Ecuador, where it is found in cloud forests.

Adults are large in size (13.5–15 mm) and have a dark brown to shiny black colour.
