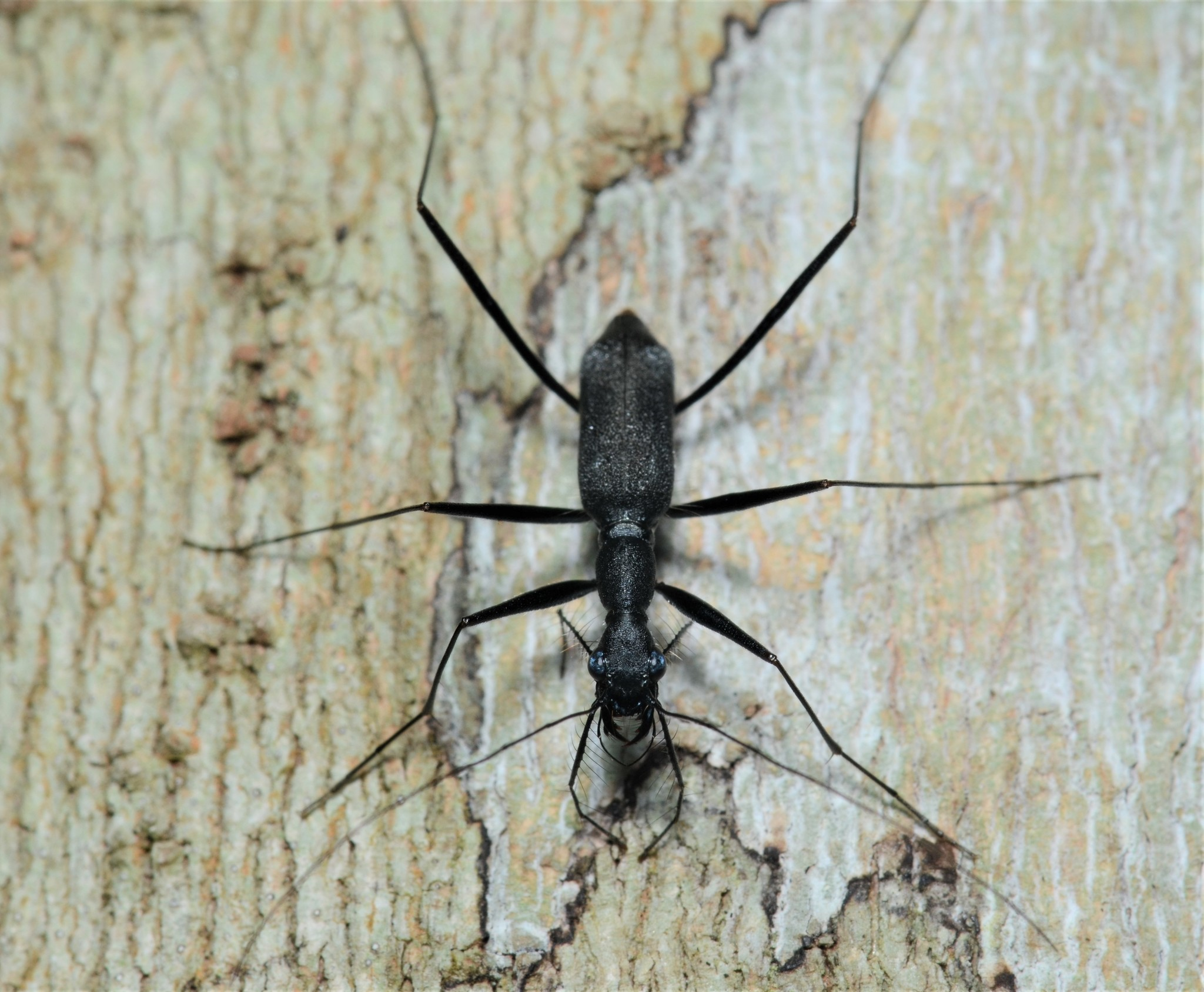
- Pogonostoma, Madagascar

Scientific classification
- Domain: Eukaryota
- Kingdom: Animalia
- Phylum: Arthropoda
- Class: Insecta
- Order: Coleoptera
- Suborder: Adephaga
- Family: Cicindelidae
- Tribe: Ctenostomatini
- Genus: Pogonostoma; Klug, 1835

Subgenera
- Bathypogonum Jeannel, 1946; Dipogonum J.Moravec, 2007; Eupogonostoma J.Moravec, 2007; Hornogeniatum J.Moravec, 2007; Leptopogonum Rivalier, 1970; Macropogonostoma J.Moravec, 2007; Mantistenocera J.Moravec, 2007; Microgeniatum Rivalier, 1970; Microstenocera Jeannel, 1946; Mitopogon Rivalier, 1970; Neopogonum J.Moravec, 2007; Parapogonum J.Moravec, 2007; Pogonostoma Klug, 1835; Polypogonostoma J.Moravec, 2007; Sexpogonum J.Moravec, 2007; Transstenocera J.Moravec, 2007

= Pogonostoma =

Genus of beetles

Pogonostoma is a genus of tiger beetles endemic to Madagascar.

== Species ==
These 113 species belong to the genus Pogonostoma:

- Pogonostoma abadiei Rivalier, 1965
- Pogonostoma affine W.Horn, 1893
- Pogonostoma alluaudi W.Horn, 1898
- Pogonostoma andranobense J.Moravec, 2007
- Pogonostoma andreevae J.Moravec, 2007
- Pogonostoma andrei J.Moravec, 1999
- Pogonostoma angustum Fleutiaux, 1902
- Pogonostoma ankaranense Deuve, 1986
- Pogonostoma anthracinum (Laporte & Gory, 1835)
- Pogonostoma atrorotundatum W.Horn, 1934
- Pogonostoma aureovirescens J.Moravec, 2007
- Pogonostoma basale Fleutiaux, 1899
- Pogonostoma basidilatatum W.Horn, 1909
- Pogonostoma beananae Rivalier, 1963
- Pogonostoma brevicorne W.Horn, 1898
- Pogonostoma brullei (Laporte & Gory, 1835)
- Pogonostoma caeruleum (Laporte & Gory, 1835)
- Pogonostoma chalybaeum Klug, 1835
- Pogonostoma comptum Rivalier, 1970
- Pogonostoma cyanescens Klug, 1835
- Pogonostoma cylindricum Fleutiaux, 1899
- Pogonostoma delphinense Jeannel, 1946
- Pogonostoma densepunctatum Rivalier, 1970
- Pogonostoma densisculptum J.Moravec, 2003
- Pogonostoma deuvei J.Moravec, 2000
- Pogonostoma differens Cassola & Andriamampianina, 2001
- Pogonostoma dohnali J.Moravec, 2000
- Pogonostoma dolini J.Moravec, 2007
- Pogonostoma elegans (Brullé, 1834)
- Pogonostoma excisoclavipenis W.Horn, 1934
- Pogonostoma externospinosum W.Horn, 1927
- Pogonostoma fabiocassolai J.Moravec, 2003
- Pogonostoma flavomaculatum W.Horn, 1892
- Pogonostoma flavopalpale Jeannel, 1946
- Pogonostoma fleutiauxi W.Horn, 1905
- Pogonostoma geniculatum Jeannel, 1946
- Pogonostoma gibbosum Rivalier, 1970
- Pogonostoma gladiator W.Horn, 1934
- Pogonostoma globicolle Rivalier, 1970
- Pogonostoma globulithorax Jeannel, 1946
- Pogonostoma hamulipenis W.Horn, 1934
- Pogonostoma heteropunctatum J.Moravec, 2000
- Pogonostoma hirofumii J.Moravec, 2003
- Pogonostoma horimichioi Razanajaonarivalona; J.Moravec & Rakotomanana, 2021
- Pogonostoma horni Fleutiaux, 1899
- Pogonostoma humbloti Rivalier, 1970
- Pogonostoma impressum Rivalier, 1970
- Pogonostoma inerme Jeannel, 1946
- Pogonostoma infimum Rivalier, 1970
- Pogonostoma janvybirali J.Moravec, 2007
- Pogonostoma juergenwiesneri J.Moravec, 2007
- Pogonostoma kraatzi W.Horn, 1894
- Pogonostoma laporti W.Horn, 1900
- Pogonostoma levigatum W.Horn, 1908
- Pogonostoma levisculptum W.Horn, 1934
- Pogonostoma litigiosum Rivalier, 1970
- Pogonostoma maculicorne W.Horn, 1934
- Pogonostoma majunganum Jeannel, 1946
- Pogonostoma malleatum Rivalier, 1970
- Pogonostoma mathiauxi Jeannel, 1946
- Pogonostoma meridionale Fleutiaux, 1899
- Pogonostoma microtuberculatum W.Horn, 1934
- Pogonostoma minimum Fleutiaux, 1899
- Pogonostoma mocquerysi Fleutiaux, 1899
- Pogonostoma moestum Rivalier, 1970
- Pogonostoma natsuae J.Moravec; Razanajaonarivalona & Hori, 2020
- Pogonostoma nigricans Klug, 1835
- Pogonostoma noheli J.Moravec & Vybiral, 2018
- Pogonostoma ovicolle W.Horn, 1893
- Pogonostoma pallipes Rivalier, 1970
- Pogonostoma parallelum W.Horn, 1909
- Pogonostoma parvulum Rivalier, 1970
- Pogonostoma perexiguum J.Moravec, 2000
- Pogonostoma perrieri Fairmaire, 1900
- Pogonostoma perroti Rivalier, 1970
- Pogonostoma peyrierasi Rivalier, 1970
- Pogonostoma phalangioide Rivalier, 1970
- Pogonostoma pliskai J.Moravec, 2003
- Pogonostoma praetervisum J.Moravec, 2005
- Pogonostoma propinquum Rivalier, 1970
- Pogonostoma propripenis J.Moravec, 2000
- Pogonostoma pseudominimum W.Horn, 1934
- Pogonostoma pusillum (Laporte & Gory, 1835)
- Pogonostoma ranomafanense J.Moravec, 2007
- Pogonostoma rivalieri J.Moravec, 2005
- Pogonostoma rugosiceps Rivalier, 1970
- Pogonostoma rugosoglabrum W.Horn, 1923
- Pogonostoma sambiranense Rivalier, 1965
- Pogonostoma sawadai J.Moravec, 2007
- Pogonostoma schaumi W.Horn, 1893
- Pogonostoma septentrionale Fleutiaux, 1903
- Pogonostoma sericeum Klug, 1835
- Pogonostoma sicardi W.Horn, 1927
- Pogonostoma sikorai W.Horn, 1894
- Pogonostoma simile Jeannel, 1946
- Pogonostoma simplex W.Horn, 1905
- Pogonostoma skrabali J.Moravec, 2000
- Pogonostoma spinipenne (Laporte & Gory, 1835)
- Pogonostoma srnkai W.Horn, 1893
- Pogonostoma subgibbosum J.Moravec, 2000
- Pogonostoma subtile W.Horn, 1904
- Pogonostoma subtiligrossum W.Horn, 1934
- Pogonostoma sudiferum Rivalier, 1965
- Pogonostoma surdum Rivalier, 1970
- Pogonostoma tortipene W.Horn, 1934
- Pogonostoma vestitum Fairmaire, 1900
- Pogonostoma violaceolevigatum W.Horn, 1927
- Pogonostoma violaceum Fleutiaux, 1902
- Pogonostoma viridipenne Jeannel, 1946
- Pogonostoma vybirali J.Moravec, 2000
- Pogonostoma wiesneri J.Moravec, 2003
- Pogonostoma zasterai J.Moravec, 2003
- Pogonostoma zombitsynense J.Moravec & Vybiral, 2010
