= Ctenostoma bifasciatum =

Scientific classification
- Kingdom: Animalia
- Phylum: Arthropoda
- Clade: Pancrustacea
- Class: Insecta
- Order: Coleoptera
- Suborder: Adephaga
- Family: Cicindelidae
- Genus: Ctenostoma
- Species: C. bifasciatum

Binomial name
- Ctenostoma bifasciatum Dejean, 1831

Species of beetle

Ctenostoma bifasciatum is a species of tiger beetle. This species is found in Brazil, where it inhabits the southern Atlantic Forest.

Adults are brachypterous.

== Subspecies ==
- Ctenostoma bifasciatum bifasciatum - double-marked comb-mouthed beetle
- Ctenostoma bifasciatum horni Naviaux, 1998 - Horn's comb-mouthed beetle
