= Ctenostoma johnsoni =

Scientific classification
- Kingdom: Animalia
- Phylum: Arthropoda
- Clade: Pancrustacea
- Class: Insecta
- Order: Coleoptera
- Suborder: Adephaga
- Family: Cicindelidae
- Genus: Ctenostoma
- Species: C. johnsoni

Binomial name
- Ctenostoma johnsoni Naviaux, 1998

Species of beetle

Ctenostoma johnsoni, or Johnson's comb-mouthed beetle, is a species of tiger beetle. This species is found in Ecuador, where it has only been recorded from central west slope of the Ecuadorian Andes.

Adults are small in size (8.5 mm) and have a shiny dark brown colour, with a broad bright yellow middle band and bright yellow large spot on the elytra.
