= Ctenostoma luctuosum =

Scientific classification
- Kingdom: Animalia
- Phylum: Arthropoda
- Clade: Pancrustacea
- Class: Insecta
- Order: Coleoptera
- Suborder: Adephaga
- Family: Cicindelidae
- Genus: Ctenostoma
- Species: C. luctuosum

Binomial name
- Ctenostoma luctuosum Chaudoir, 1861

Species of beetle

Ctenostoma luctuosum, the mournful comb-mouthed beetle, is a species of tiger beetle. This species is found in French Guiana, Peru and Brazil, where it inhabits lowland rainforests.
