= Ctenostoma crucifrons =

Scientific classification
- Kingdom: Animalia
- Phylum: Arthropoda
- Clade: Pancrustacea
- Class: Insecta
- Order: Coleoptera
- Suborder: Adephaga
- Family: Cicindelidae
- Genus: Ctenostoma
- Species: C. crucifrons

Binomial name
- Ctenostoma crucifrons W.Horn, 1911

Species of beetle

Ctenostoma crucifrons, the cross-faced comb-mouthed beetle, is a species of tiger beetle. This species is found in Peru, where it inhabits low- to midland rainforests.

Adults are small (10 mm) and brachypterous.
