= Ctenostoma crudelum =

Scientific classification
- Kingdom: Animalia
- Phylum: Arthropoda
- Clade: Pancrustacea
- Class: Insecta
- Order: Coleoptera
- Suborder: Adephaga
- Family: Cicindelidae
- Genus: Ctenostoma
- Species: C. crudelum

Binomial name
- Ctenostoma crudelum Naviaux & Schüle, 2008

Species of beetle

Ctenostoma crudelum is a species of tiger beetle. This species is found in Colombia.

Adults have a length of about 15 mm.
