= Ctenostoma immaculatum =

Scientific classification
- Kingdom: Animalia
- Phylum: Arthropoda
- Clade: Pancrustacea
- Class: Insecta
- Order: Coleoptera
- Suborder: Adephaga
- Family: Cicindelidae
- Genus: Ctenostoma
- Species: C. immaculatum

Binomial name
- Ctenostoma immaculatum (W.Horn, 1925)

Synonyms
- Procephalus immaculatus W.Horn, 1925

Species of beetle

Ctenostoma immaculatum, the non-spotted comb-mouthed beetle, is a species of tiger beetle. This species is found in Ecuador, where it has only been recorded from the western slope of the Andes mountains at a single location in Chimborazo Province.

Adults are medium-sized (11 mm) and are dark reddish-brown in colour.
