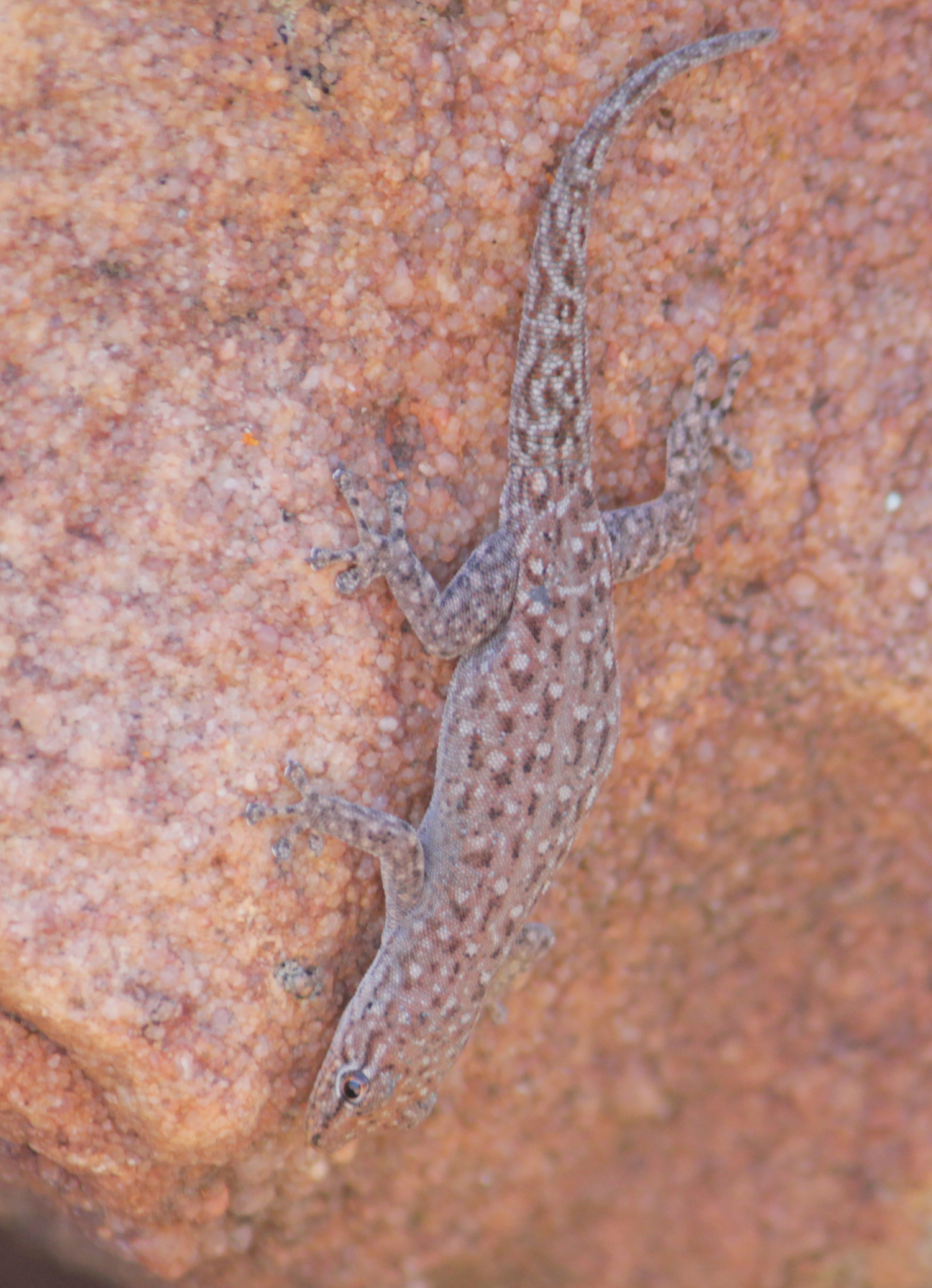

Conservation status
- Least Concern (IUCN 3.1)

Scientific classification
- Kingdom: Animalia
- Phylum: Chordata
- Class: Reptilia
- Order: Squamata
- Suborder: Gekkota
- Family: Gekkonidae
- Genus: Lygodactylus
- Species: L. soutpansbergensis

Binomial name
- Lygodactylus soutpansbergensis Jacobsen, 1994

Synonyms
- Lygodactylus ocellatus soutpansbergensis Jacobsen, 1994

= Lygodactylus soutpansbergensis =

Soutpansberg dwarf gecko

Species of lizard

Lygodactylus soutpansbergensis, the Soutpansberg dwarf gecko, is a species of gecko endemic to Limpopo province, South Africa. It was originally described as a subspecies of Lygodactylus ocellatus. It is known from the eponymous Soutpansberg as well as from Blouberg ranges.
