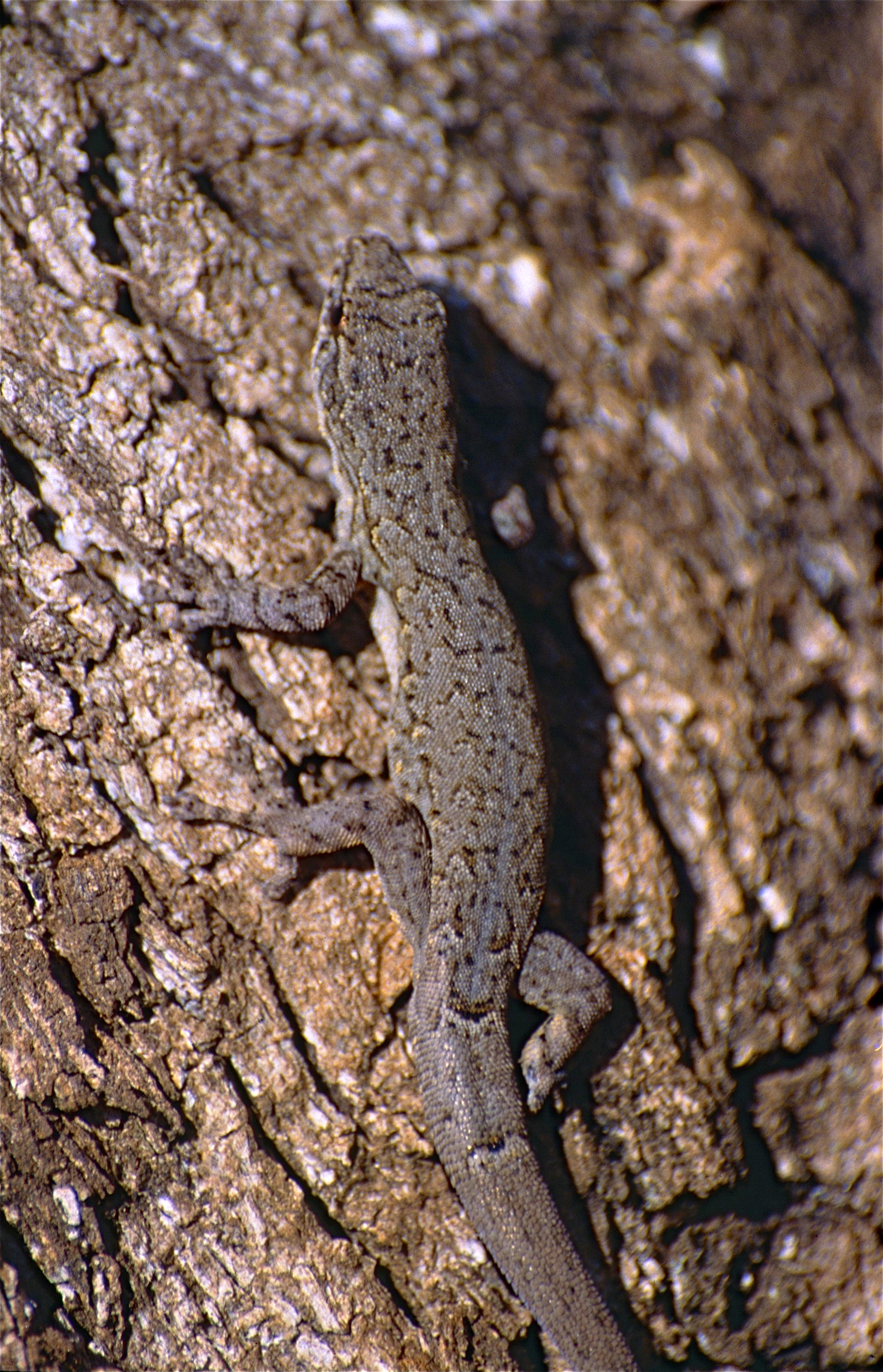

Conservation status
- Least Concern (IUCN 3.1)

Scientific classification
- Kingdom: Animalia
- Phylum: Chordata
- Class: Reptilia
- Order: Squamata
- Suborder: Gekkota
- Family: Gekkonidae
- Genus: Lygodactylus
- Species: L. pictus

Binomial name
- Lygodactylus pictus (Peters, 1883)
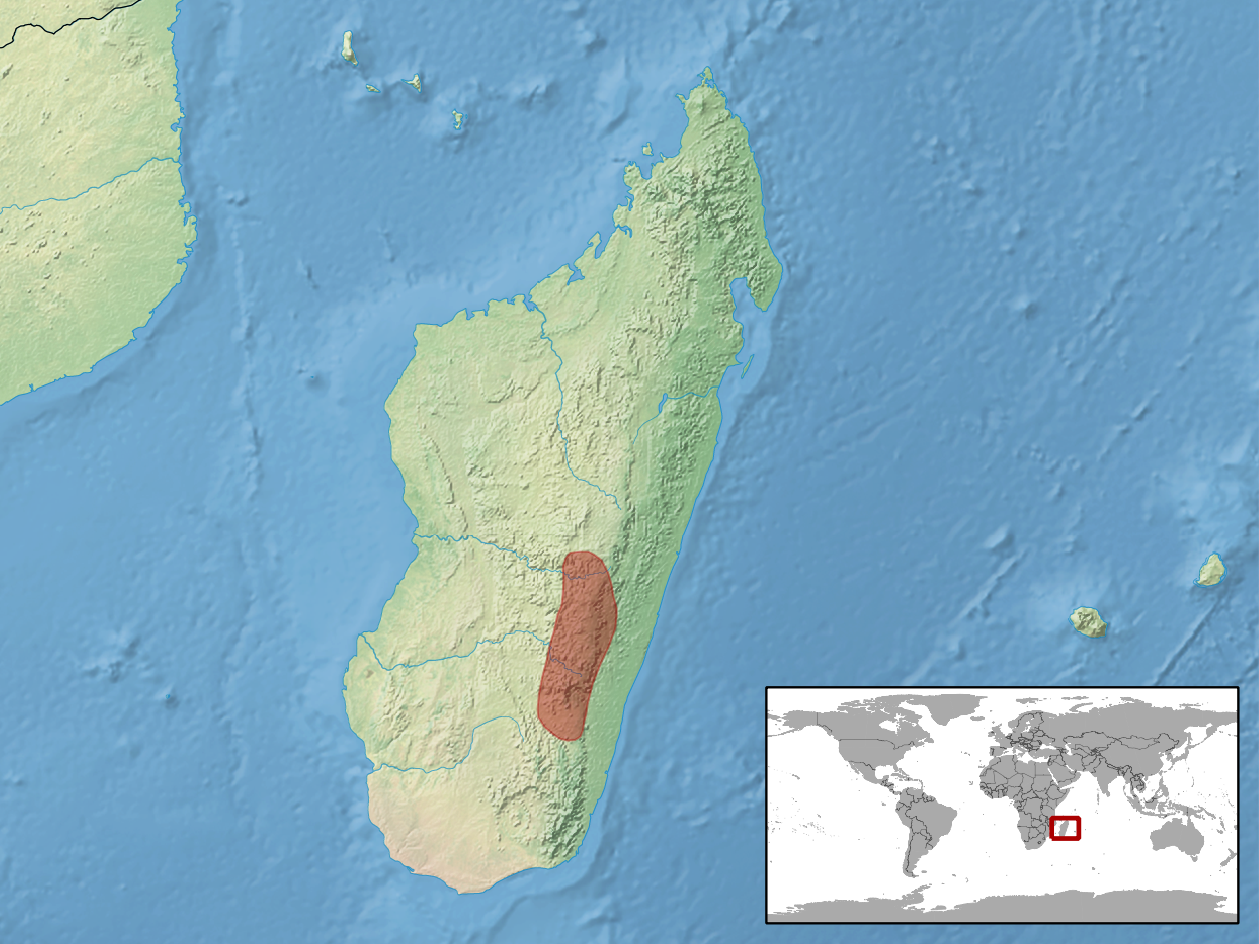

Synonyms
- Scalabotes pictus

= Robust dwarf gecko =

Species of lizard

The robust dwarf gecko (Lygodactylus pictus) is a species of gecko endemic to southern Madagascar.
