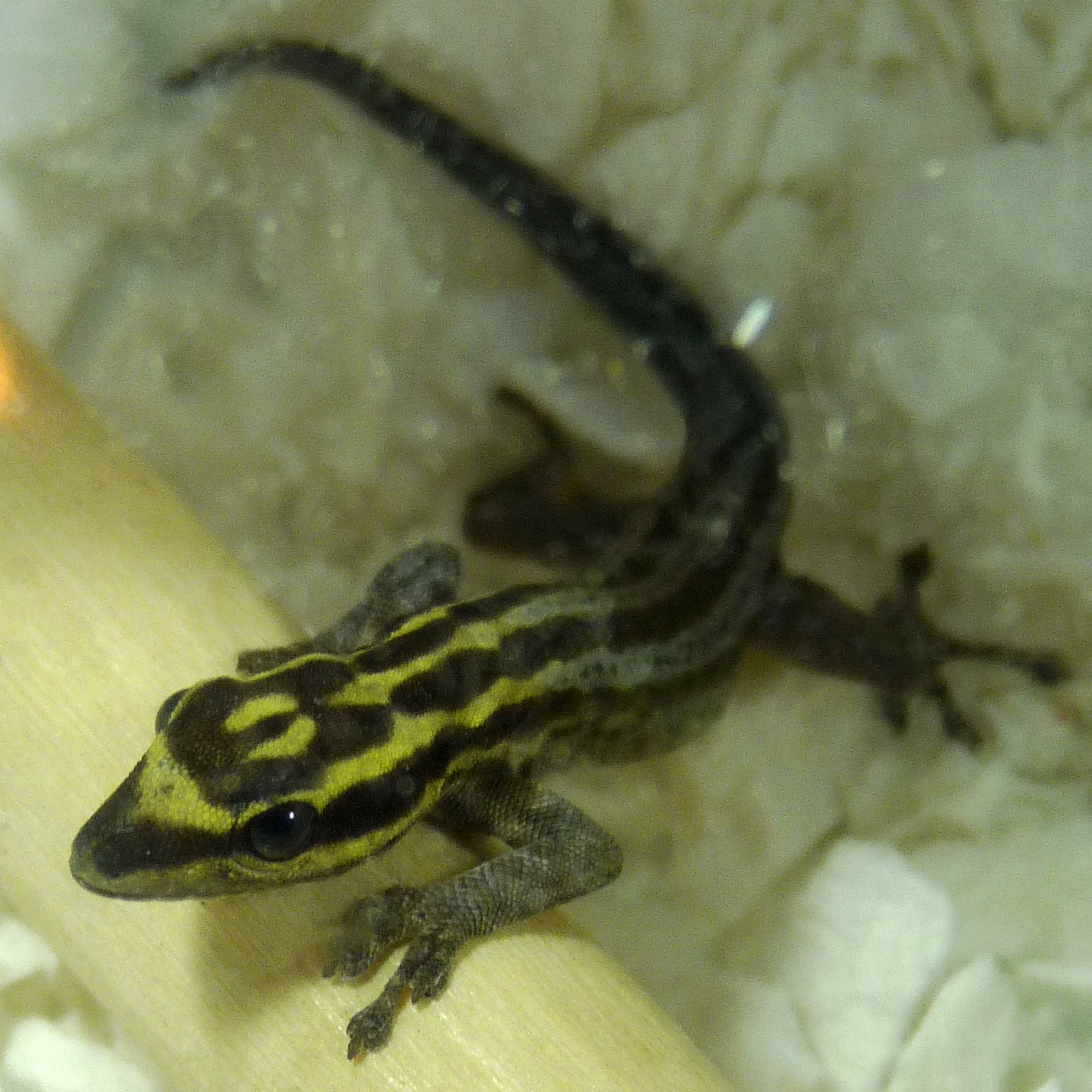

Conservation status
- Least Concern (IUCN 3.1)

Scientific classification
- Kingdom: Animalia
- Phylum: Chordata
- Class: Reptilia
- Order: Squamata
- Suborder: Gekkota
- Family: Gekkonidae
- Genus: Lygodactylus
- Species: L. kimhowelli

Binomial name
- Lygodactylus kimhowelli G. Pasteur, 1995

= Lygodactylus kimhowelli =

Species of lizard

Lygodactylus kimhowelli, also known commonly as Kim Howell's dwarf gecko, the Tanzanian dwarf gecko, and the zebra dwarf gecko, is a species of lizard in the family Gekkonidae. The species is endemic to Tanzania.

== Etymology ==
The specific name, kimhowelli, is in honor of herpetologist Kim Monroe Howell (born 1945).

== Habitat ==
The preferred natural habitat of L. kimhowelli is forest, at altitudes from sea level to 1,350 m (4,430 ft), but it has also been found in suburban gardens.

== Behavior ==
L. kimhowelli is arboreal and diurnal.

== Reproduction ==
L. kimhowelli is oviparous. Clutch size is two eggs.
