= South American dwarf gecko =

Conservation status
- Least Concern (IUCN 3.1)

Scientific classification
- Kingdom: Animalia
- Phylum: Chordata
- Class: Reptilia
- Order: Squamata
- Suborder: Gekkota
- Family: Gekkonidae
- Genus: Lygodactylus
- Species: L. wetzeli

Binomial name
- Lygodactylus wetzeli (H.M. Smith, R.L. Martin & Swain, 1977)

Synonyms
- Vanzoia wetzeli H.M. Smith, R.L. Martin & Swain, 1977; Lygodactylus wetzeli — Bons & G. Pasteur, 1977

Species of lizard

The South American dwarf gecko (Lygodactylus wetzeli) is a species of lizard in the family Gekkonidae. The species is endemic to South America.

== Etymology ==
The specific name, wetzeli, is in honor of American mammalogist Ralph M. Wetzel.

== Geographic range ==
L. wetzeli is found in eastern Bolivia, midwestern Brazil, and northern Paraguay.

== Habitat ==
The preferred natural habitat of L. wetzeli is savanna.

== Reproduction ==
L. wetzeli is oviparous.
