= Lygodactylus montiscaeruli =

Conservation status
- Least Concern (IUCN 3.1)

Scientific classification
- Kingdom: Animalia
- Phylum: Chordata
- Class: Reptilia
- Order: Squamata
- Suborder: Gekkota
- Family: Gekkonidae
- Genus: Lygodactylus
- Species: L. montiscaeruli

Binomial name
- Lygodactylus montiscaeruli Jacobsen, 1992

Synonyms
- Lygodactylus nigropunctatus montiscaeruli Jacobsen, 1992; Lygodactylus montiscaeruli — Travers, Jackman & Bauer, 2014

Species of lizard

The Makgabeng dwarf gecko (Lygodactylus montiscaeruli) is a species of lizard in the family Gekkonidae. The species is endemic to South Africa.

== Habitat ==
The preferred natural habitats of L. montiscaeruli are rocky areas and savanna.

== Description ==
L. montiscaeruli has 7 to 8 precloacal pores.

== Reproduction ==
L. montiscaeruli is oviparous.
