= Lygodactylus tchokwe =

Scientific classification
- Kingdom: Animalia
- Phylum: Chordata
- Class: Reptilia
- Order: Squamata
- Suborder: Gekkota
- Family: Gekkonidae
- Genus: Lygodactylus
- Species: L. tchokwe

Binomial name
- Lygodactylus tchokwe Marques, Ceríaco, Buehler, Bandeira, Janota, & Bauer, 2020

Species of lizard

Lygodactylus tchokwe, the Tchokwe dwarf gecko, is a species of gecko endemic to Angola.
