= Lygodactylus blancae =

Conservation status
- Near Threatened (IUCN 3.1)

Scientific classification
- Kingdom: Animalia
- Phylum: Chordata
- Class: Reptilia
- Order: Squamata
- Suborder: Gekkota
- Family: Gekkonidae
- Genus: Lygodactylus
- Species: L. blancae

Binomial name
- Lygodactylus blancae G. Pasteur, 1995
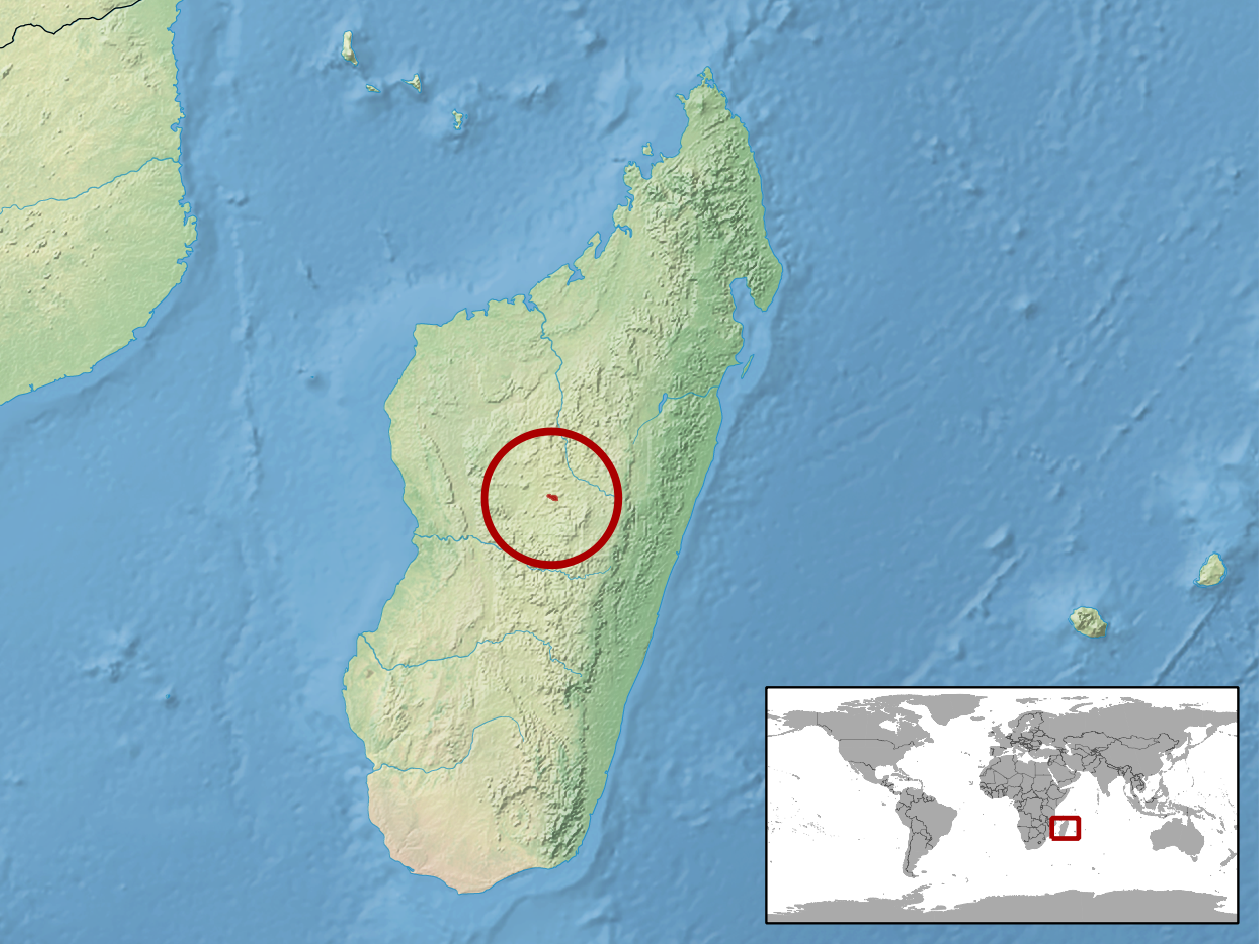

Species of lizard

Lygodactylus blancae is a species of gecko, a lizard in the family Gekkonidae. The species is endemic to Madagascar.

== Etymology ==
The specific name, blancae, is in honor of French geneticist fr:Françoise Blanc.

== Habitat ==
The natural habitat of L. blancae is unknown. It has been found in villages at altitudes of 950–1,350 m (3,120–4,430 ft).

== Reproduction ==
L. blancae is oviparous.
