= Lygodactylus viscatus =

Conservation status
- Near Threatened (IUCN 3.1)

Scientific classification
- Kingdom: Animalia
- Phylum: Chordata
- Class: Reptilia
- Order: Squamata
- Suborder: Gekkota
- Family: Gekkonidae
- Genus: Lygodactylus
- Species: L. viscatus

Binomial name
- Lygodactylus viscatus Vaillant, 1873

Synonyms
- Lygodactylus somalicus howelli Lygodactylus howelli

Species of lizard

Lygodactylus viscatus is a species of gecko endemic to Zanzibar.
