= Pasteur's dwarf gecko =

Conservation status
- Least Concern (IUCN 3.1)

Scientific classification
- Kingdom: Animalia
- Phylum: Chordata
- Class: Reptilia
- Order: Squamata
- Suborder: Gekkota
- Family: Gekkonidae
- Genus: Lygodactylus
- Species: L. arnoulti

Binomial name
- Lygodactylus arnoulti G. Pasteur, 1965
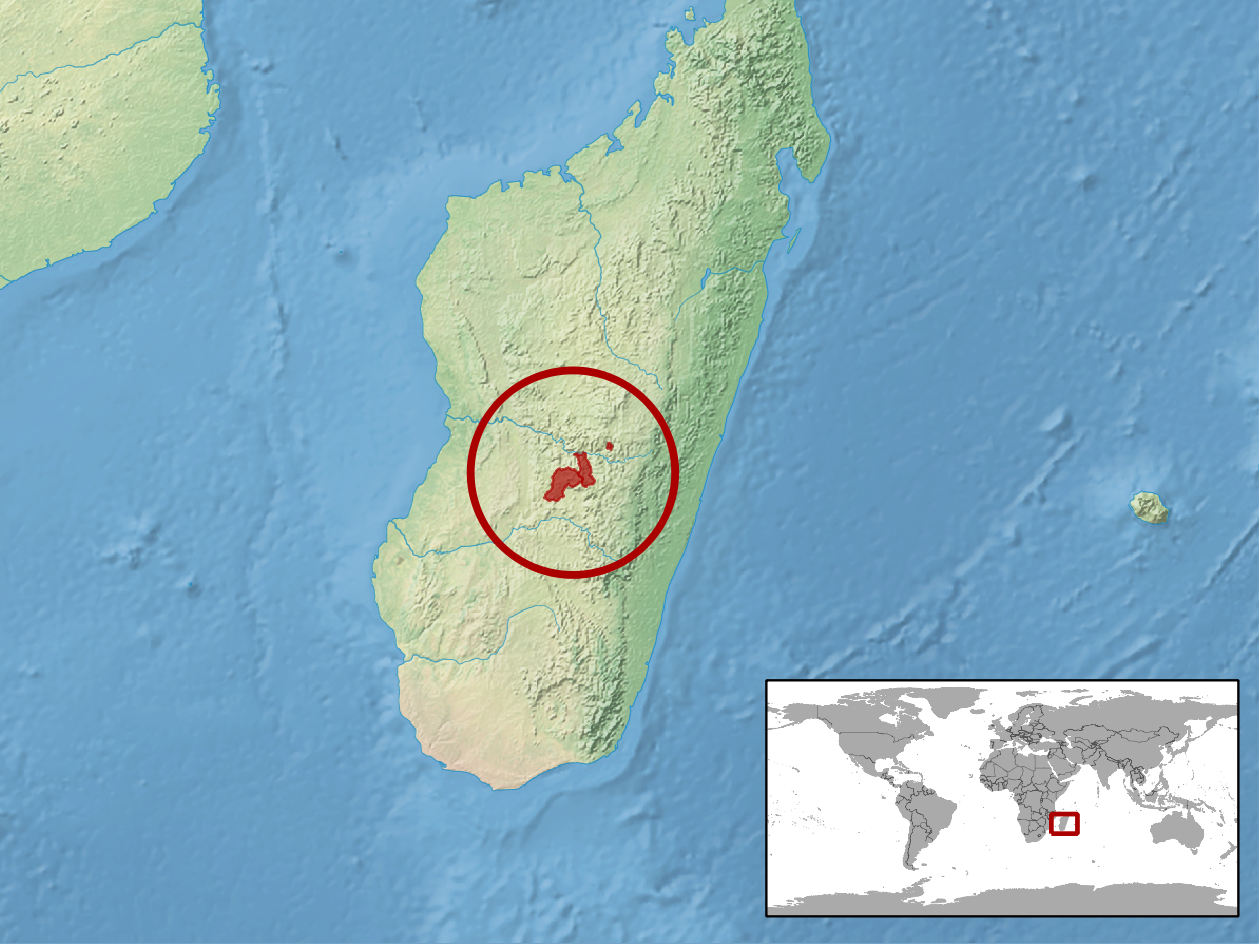
- Geographic range of L.arnoulti on the island of Madagascar.

Species of lizard

Pasteur's dwarf gecko (Lygodactylus arnoulti), also commonly known as Arnoult's gecko, is a species of gecko, a lizard in the family Gekkonidae. The species is native to Madagascar.

== Etymology ==
The specific name, arnoulti, is in honor of French ichthyologist Jacques Arnoult (1914–1995).

== Habitat ==
The preferred natural habitats of L. arnoulti are grassland and savanna, at altitudes of 1,700–2,100 m (5,600–6,900 ft).

== Reproduction ==
L. arnoulti is oviparous.
