= Thin dwarf gecko =

Conservation status
- Near Threatened (IUCN 3.1)

Scientific classification
- Kingdom: Animalia
- Phylum: Chordata
- Class: Reptilia
- Order: Squamata
- Suborder: Gekkota
- Family: Gekkonidae
- Genus: Lygodactylus
- Species: L. rarus

Binomial name
- Lygodactylus rarus Pasteur & Blanc, 1973
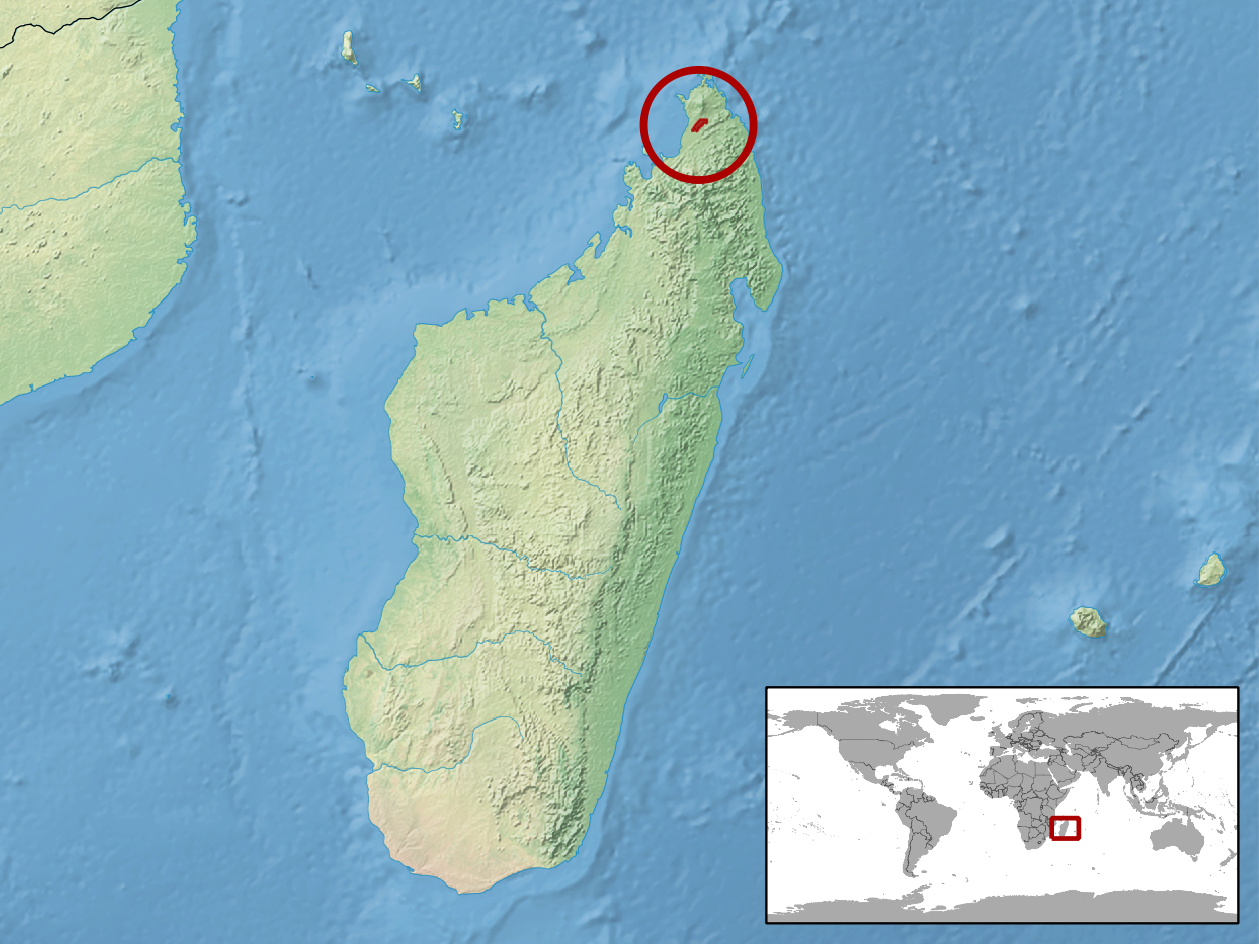

Species of lizard

The thin dwarf gecko (Lygodactylus rarus) is a species of gecko endemic to northern Madagascar.
