= Ornate dwarf gecko =

Conservation status
- Endangered (IUCN 3.1)

Scientific classification
- Kingdom: Animalia
- Phylum: Chordata
- Class: Reptilia
- Order: Squamata
- Suborder: Gekkota
- Family: Gekkonidae
- Genus: Lygodactylus
- Species: L. ornatus

Binomial name
- Lygodactylus ornatus Pasteur, 1965
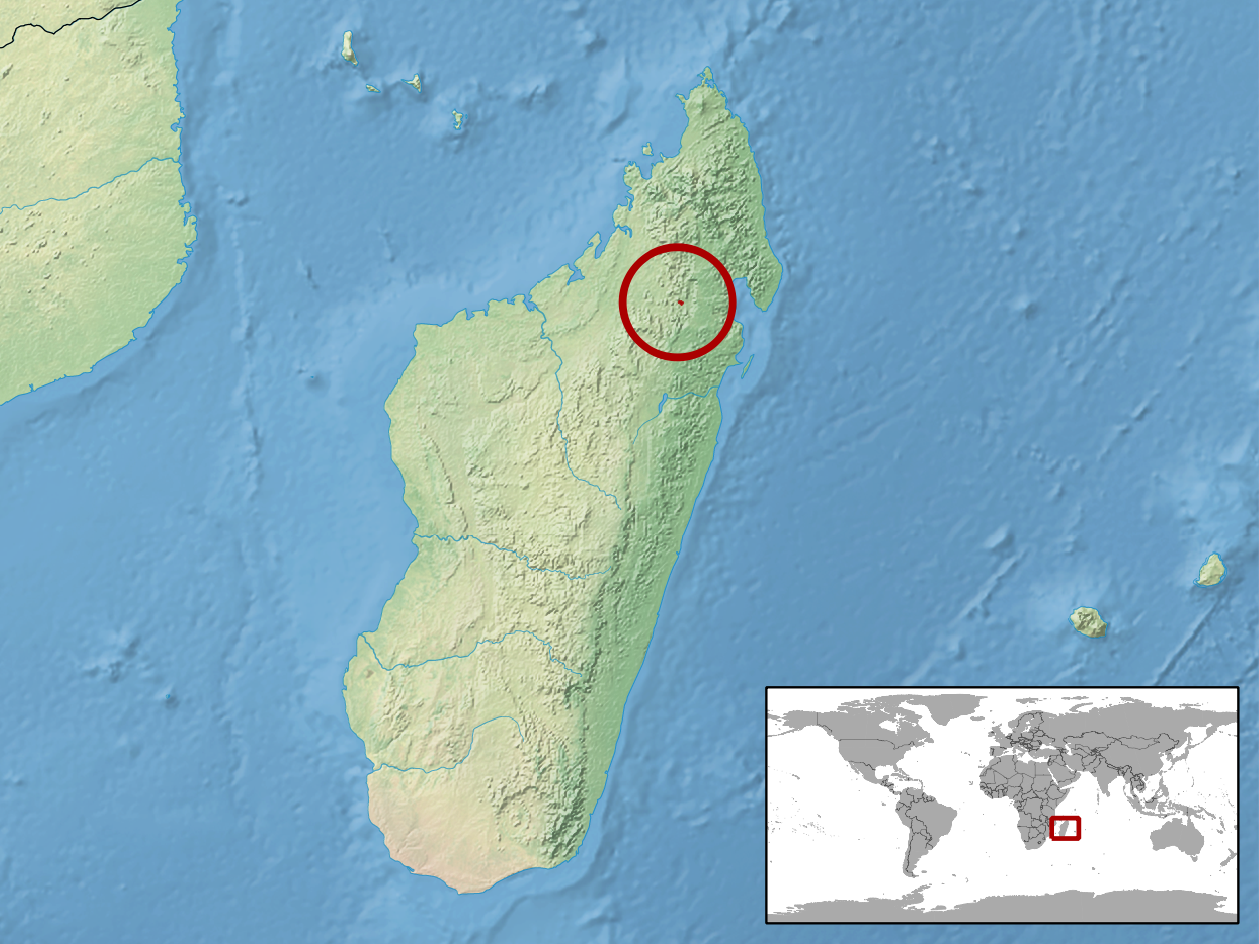

Species of lizard

The ornate dwarf gecko (Lygodactylus ornatus) is a species of gecko endemic to Madagascar.
