= Lygodactylus baptistai =

Scientific classification
- Kingdom: Animalia
- Phylum: Chordata
- Class: Reptilia
- Order: Squamata
- Suborder: Gekkota
- Family: Gekkonidae
- Genus: Lygodactylus
- Species: L. baptistai

Binomial name
- Lygodactylus baptistai Marques, Ceríaco, Buehler, Bandeira, Janota & Bauer, 2020

Species of lizard

Lygodactylus baptistai is a species of gecko endemic to Angola.
