= Granite dwarf gecko =

Conservation status
- Least Concern (IUCN 3.1)

Scientific classification
- Kingdom: Animalia
- Phylum: Chordata
- Class: Reptilia
- Order: Squamata
- Suborder: Gekkota
- Family: Gekkonidae
- Genus: Lygodactylus
- Species: L. graniticolus

Binomial name
- Lygodactylus graniticolus Jacobsen, 1992

Species of lizard

The granite dwarf gecko (Lygodactylus graniticolus) is a species of gecko endemic to the Limpopo Province in South Africa.
