= Lygodactylus laterimaculatus =

Conservation status
- Least Concern (IUCN 3.1)

Scientific classification
- Kingdom: Animalia
- Phylum: Chordata
- Class: Reptilia
- Order: Squamata
- Suborder: Gekkota
- Family: Gekkonidae
- Genus: Lygodactylus
- Species: L. laterimaculatus

Binomial name
- Lygodactylus laterimaculatus Pasteur, 1964

Synonyms
- Lygodactylus scheffleri laterimaculatus

Species of lizard

Lygodactylus laterimaculatus is a species of gecko endemic to Kenya and Tanzania. It is sometimes considered conspecific with Scheffler's dwarf gecko.
