= Lygodactylus tsavoensis =

Scientific classification
- Kingdom: Animalia
- Phylum: Chordata
- Class: Reptilia
- Order: Squamata
- Suborder: Gekkota
- Family: Gekkonidae
- Genus: Lygodactylus
- Species: L. tsavoensis

Binomial name
- Lygodactylus tsavoensis Malonza, Bauer, Granthon, Williams, & Wojnowski, 2019

Species of lizard

Lygodactylus tsavoensis, the Tsavo dwarf gecko, is a species of gecko endemic to Kenya.
