= Günther's dwarf gecko =

Conservation status
- Least Concern (IUCN 3.1)

Scientific classification
- Kingdom: Animalia
- Phylum: Chordata
- Class: Reptilia
- Order: Squamata
- Suborder: Gekkota
- Family: Gekkonidae
- Genus: Lygodactylus
- Species: L. miops

Binomial name
- Lygodactylus miops Günther, 1891
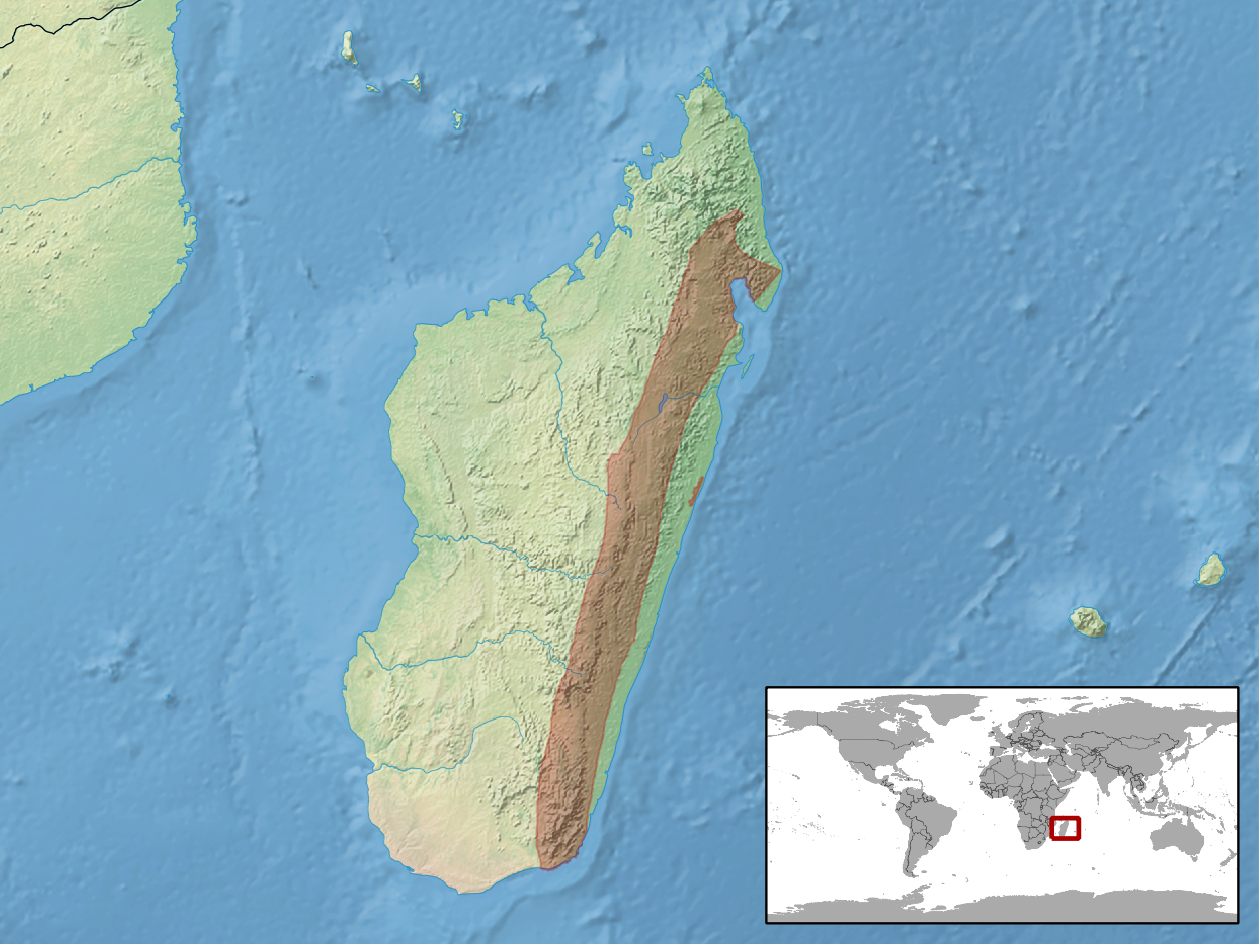

Synonyms
- Microscalabotes spinulifer Lygodactylus septemtuberculatus

Species of lizard

Günther's dwarf gecko (Lygodactylus miops) is a species of gecko endemic to Madagascar.
