= Lygodactylus regulus =

Conservation status
- Near Threatened (IUCN 3.1)

Scientific classification
- Kingdom: Animalia
- Phylum: Chordata
- Class: Reptilia
- Order: Squamata
- Suborder: Gekkota
- Family: Gekkonidae
- Genus: Lygodactylus
- Species: L. regulus

Binomial name
- Lygodactylus regulus Portik, Travers, Bauer & Branch, 2013

Species of lizard

Lygodactylus regulus, the prince dwarf gecko, is a species of gecko. It is endemic to Mozambique and only known from Mount Namuli. It occurs at elevations between 1,200 and 1,800 m (3,900 and 5,900 ft) above sea level and seems to rely on forest and dense woodland; although it has been encountered in modified habitats, it is unclear whether it can persist in such habitats.

Adult males measure 38–39 mm (1.50–1.54 in) and adult females 38–40 mm (1.50–1.57 in) in snout–vent length.
