= Angel's dwarf gecko =

Conservation status
- Data Deficient (IUCN 3.1)

Scientific classification
- Kingdom: Animalia
- Phylum: Chordata
- Class: Reptilia
- Order: Squamata
- Suborder: Gekkota
- Family: Gekkonidae
- Genus: Lygodactylus
- Species: L. decaryi

Binomial name
- Lygodactylus decaryi Angel, 1930
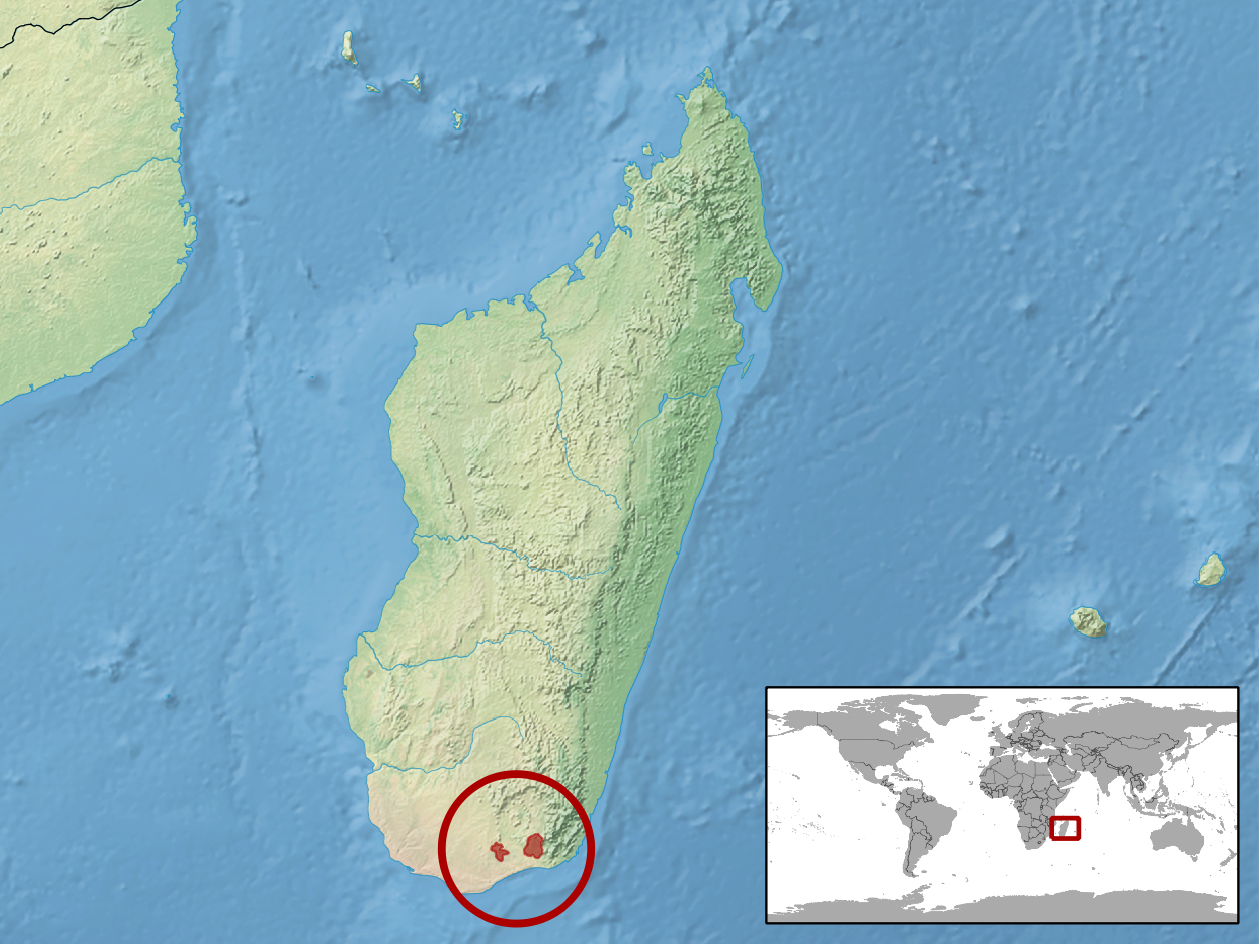

Species of lizard

Angel's dwarf gecko (Lygodactylus decaryi) is a species of lizard in the family Gekkonidae. The species is endemic to Madagascar.

== Etymology ==
The specific name, decaryi, is in honor of French botanist Raymond Decary.

== Geographic range ==
L. decaryi is found in southern Madagascar.

== Habitat ==
The preferred natural habitat of L. decaryi is savanna, at an altitude of 400 m (1,300 ft).

== Reproduction ==
L. decaryi is oviparous.
