= Black-spotted dwarf gecko =

Conservation status
- Least Concern (IUCN 3.1)

Scientific classification
- Domain: Eukaryota
- Kingdom: Animalia
- Phylum: Chordata
- Class: Reptilia
- Order: Squamata
- Infraorder: Gekkota
- Family: Gekkonidae
- Genus: Lygodactylus
- Species: L. nigropunctatus

Binomial name
- Lygodactylus nigropunctatus Jacobsen, 1992
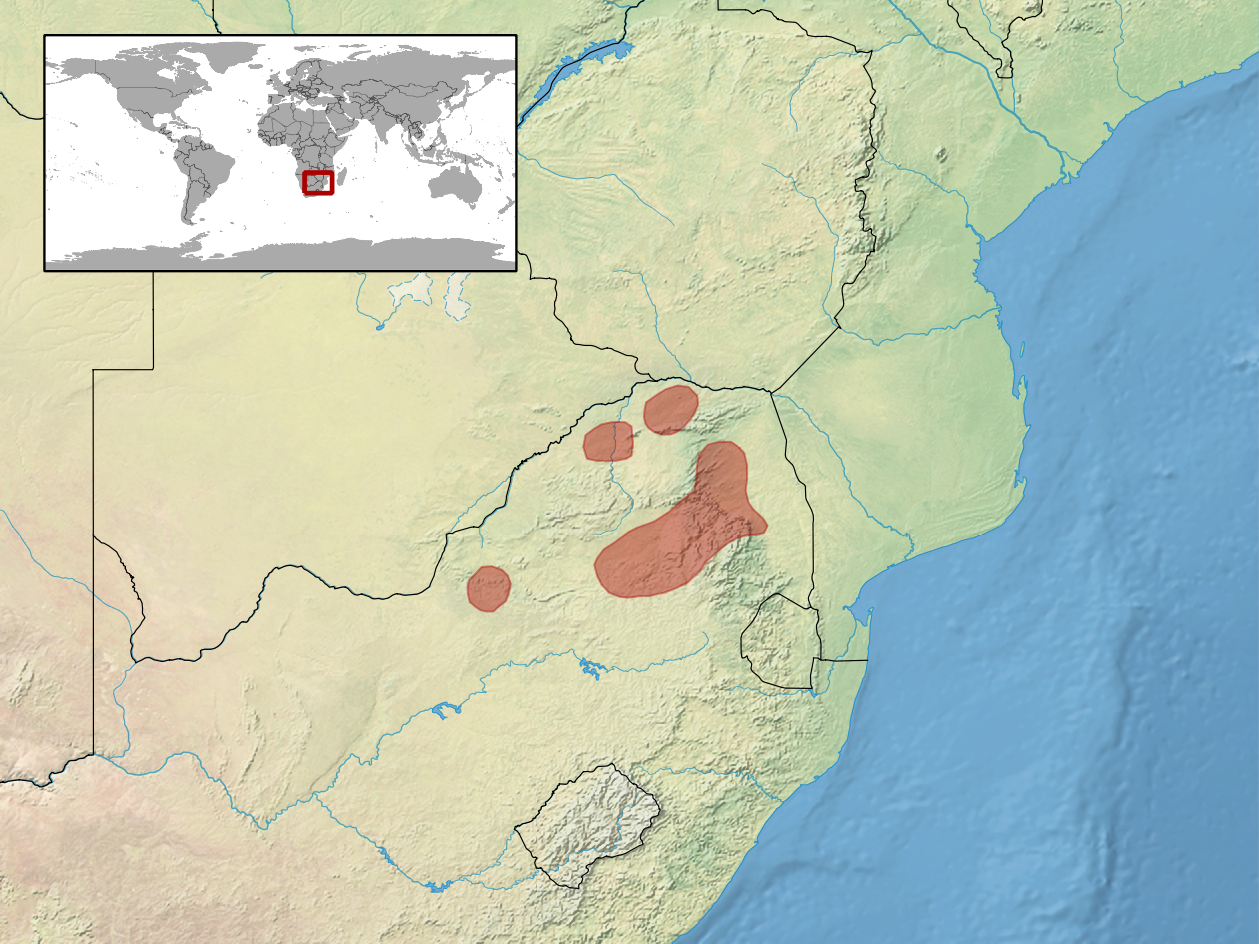

Species of lizard

The black-spotted dwarf gecko (Lygodactylus nigropunctatus) is a species of gecko endemic to the northern South Africa (Gauteng, Limpopo, Mpumalanga, and North-West Provinces).
