= Zaire dwarf gecko =

Scientific classification
- Domain: Eukaryota
- Kingdom: Animalia
- Phylum: Chordata
- Class: Reptilia
- Order: Squamata
- Infraorder: Gekkota
- Family: Gekkonidae
- Genus: Lygodactylus
- Species: L. depressus

Binomial name
- Lygodactylus depressus Schmidt, 1919

Synonyms
- Lygodactylus picturatus depressus

Species of lizard

The Zaire dwarf gecko (Lygodactylus depressus) is a species of gecko found in central Africa, specifically in Cameroon, the Central African Republic, the Republic of the Congo, and the Democratic Republic of the Congo. It is oviparous.
