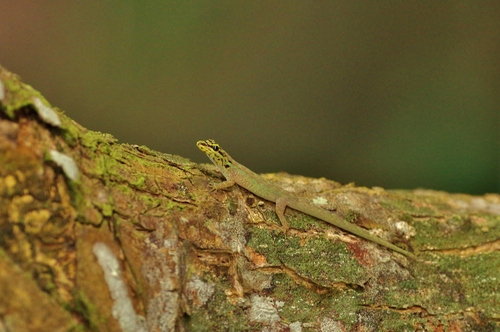
- Subspecies delicatus, from Príncipe

Scientific classification
- Domain: Eukaryota
- Kingdom: Animalia
- Phylum: Chordata
- Class: Reptilia
- Order: Squamata
- Infraorder: Gekkota
- Family: Gekkonidae
- Genus: Lygodactylus
- Species: L. thomensis

Binomial name
- Lygodactylus thomensis (Peters, 1881)

Synonyms
- Scalabotes thomensis Lygodactylus rolasi Lygodactylus delicatus

= Annobon dwarf gecko =

Species of lizard

The Annobón dwarf gecko (Lygodactylus thomensis) is a species of gecko. It is only found on a number of islands or islets in the Gulf of Guinea, specifically Annobón (Equatorial Guinea), Príncipe, São Tomé, and Ilhéu das Rolas (São Tomé and Príncipe).
