= Lygodactylus intermedius =

Conservation status
- Endangered (IUCN 3.1)

Scientific classification
- Kingdom: Animalia
- Phylum: Chordata
- Class: Reptilia
- Order: Squamata
- Suborder: Gekkota
- Family: Gekkonidae
- Genus: Lygodactylus
- Species: L. intermedius

Binomial name
- Lygodactylus intermedius Pasteur, 1995
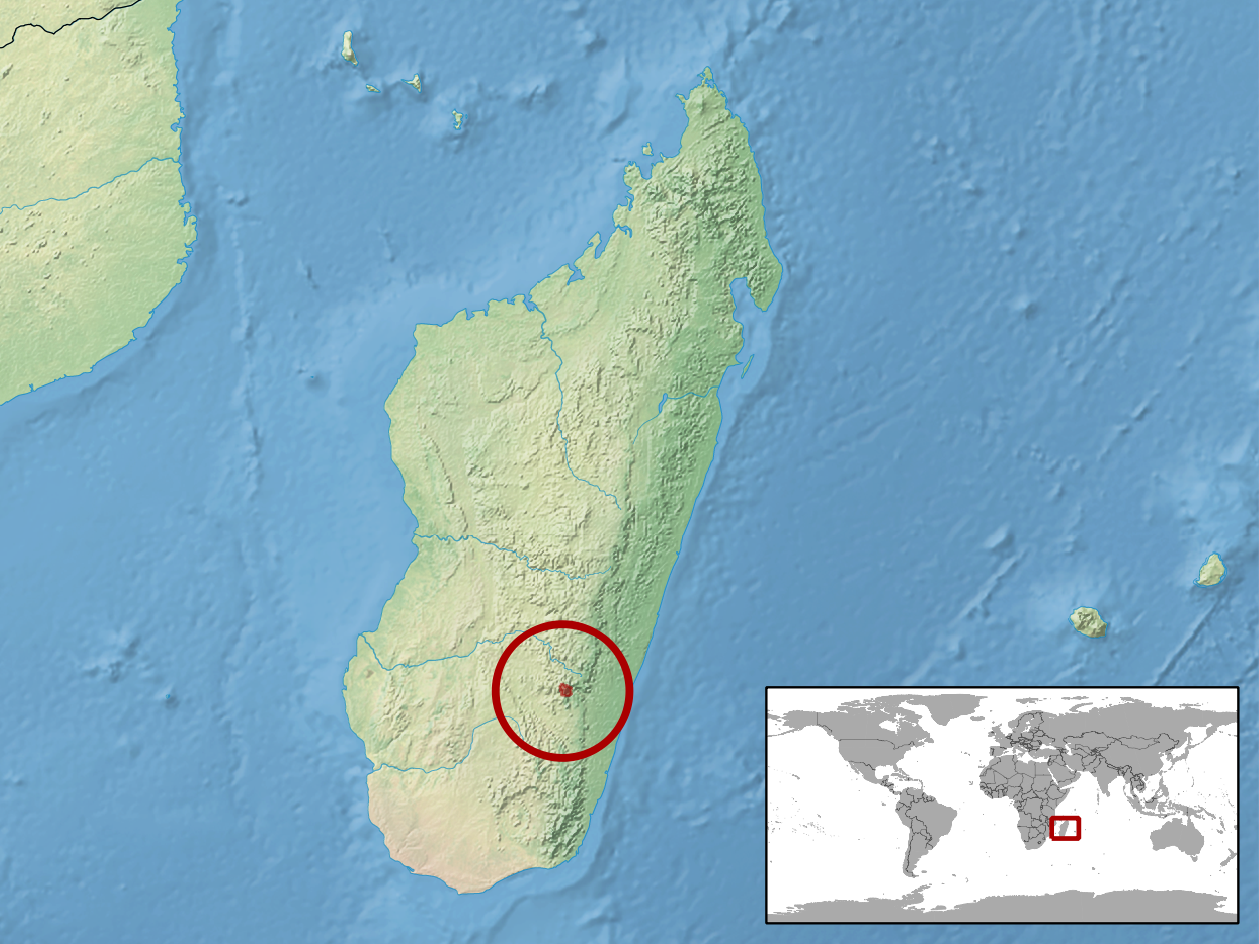

Species of lizard

Lygodactylus intermedius is a species of gecko endemic to Madagascar.
