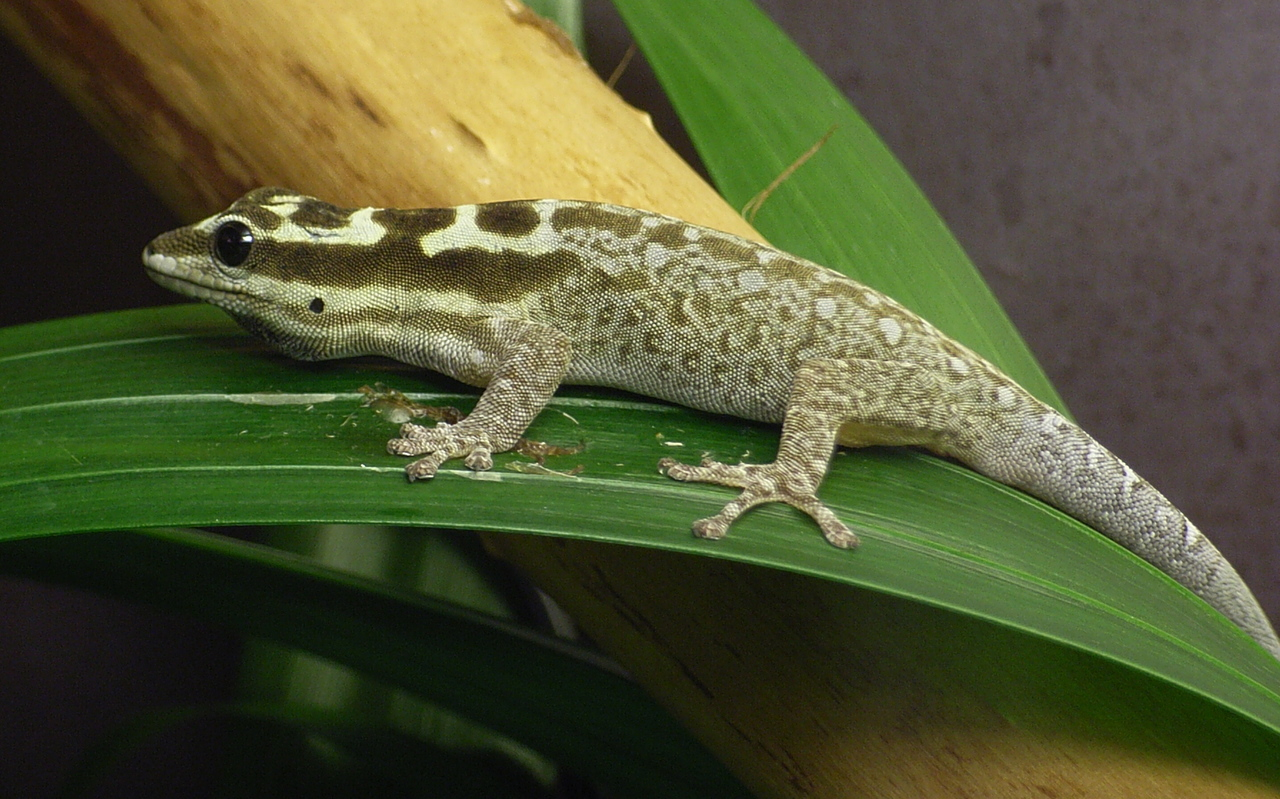

Conservation status
- Least Concern (IUCN 3.1)

Scientific classification
- Kingdom: Animalia
- Phylum: Chordata
- Class: Reptilia
- Order: Squamata
- Suborder: Gekkota
- Family: Gekkonidae
- Genus: Lygodactylus
- Species: L. mombasicus

Binomial name
- Lygodactylus mombasicus Loveridge, 1935

Synonyms
- Lygodactylus picturatus mombasicus

= Lygodactylus mombasicus =

Species of lizard

Lygodactylus mombasicus is a species of gecko found in coastal Kenya and northern Tanzania.
