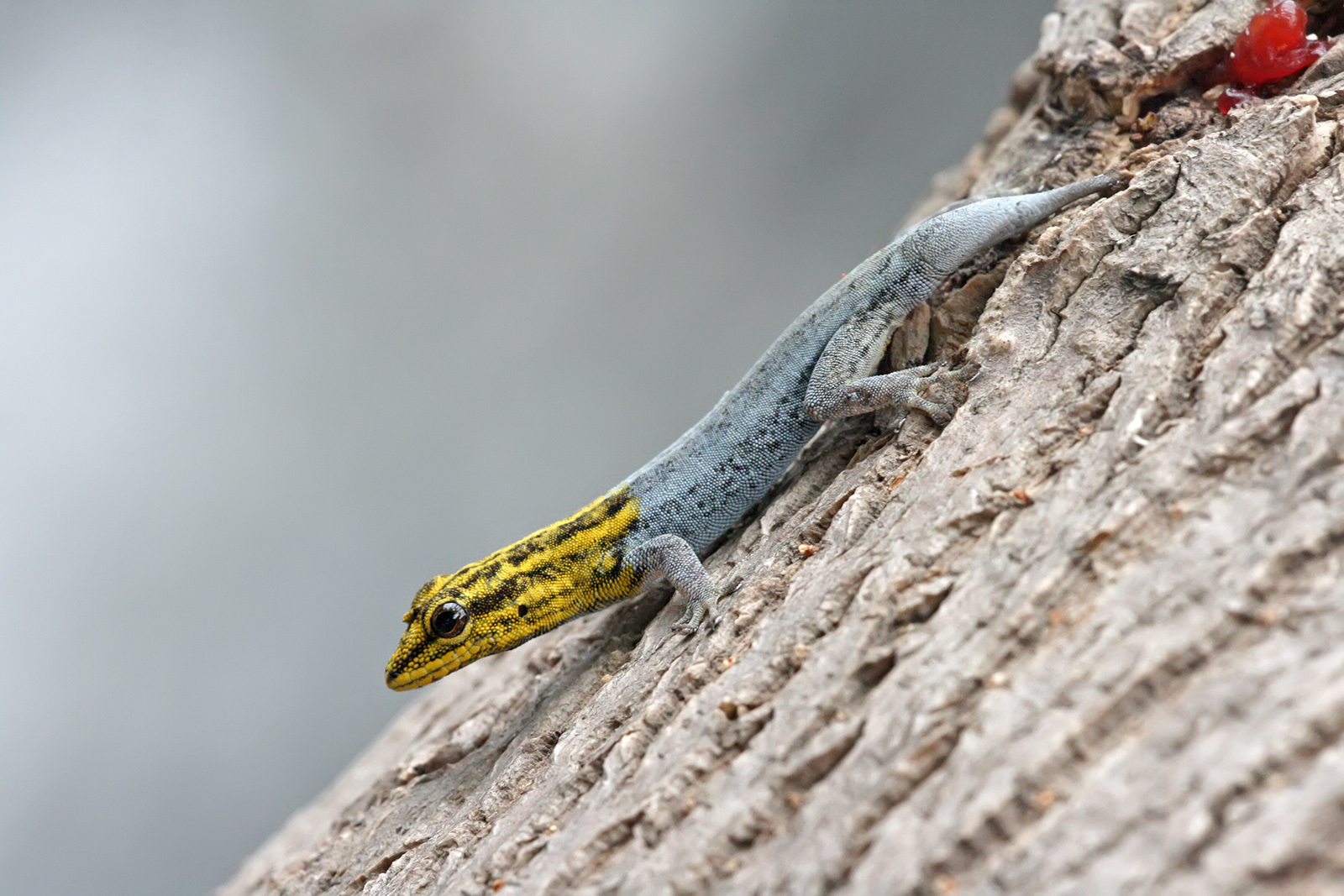
- Lygodactylus luteopicturatus

Scientific classification
- Kingdom: Animalia
- Phylum: Chordata
- Class: Reptilia
- Order: Squamata
- Suborder: Gekkota
- Family: Gekkonidae
- Subfamily: Uroplatinae
- Genus: Lygodactylus; Gray, 1864

Diversity
- 82 spp.

= Lygodactylus =

Genus of lizards

Lygodactylus is a genus of diurnal geckos with 82 species. They are commonly referred to as dwarf geckos. They are mainly found in Africa and Madagascar although two species are found in South America. Lygodactylus picturatus, the best known species, is found in Kenya and commonly known as the white-headed dwarf gecko. Recently, illegal importation from Tanzania of brightly colored (and critically-endangered), Lygodactylus williamsi, known as electric blue geckos, has been gaining attention for Lygodactylus geckos in the reptile trade.

Since all trade in wild-caught Lygodactylus williamsi is illegal, shipments of these geckos are often intentionally mislabelled as Lygodactylus spp. or as Lygodactylus capensis. As some customs officials have difficulty identifying members of this genus, a Lygodactylus spp. identification guide has been published online by CITES.

== Species ==
Species in alphabetical order by specific name:

- Lygodactylus angolensis Bocage, 1896 – Angola dwarf gecko
- Lygodactylus angularis Günther, 1893 – angulated dwarf gecko
- Lygodactylus anjajavy Vences, Herrmann, Multzsch, Gippner, Razafimanafo, Rahagalala, Rakotomanga, Rakotoarison, Glaw & Miralles, 2025 – Anjajavy dwarf gecko
- Lygodactylus arnoulti G. Pasteur, 1965 – Pasteur's dwarf gecko, Arnoult's dwarf gecko
- Lygodactylus baptistai Marques, Ceríaco, Buehler, Bandeira, Janota & Bauer, 2020
- Lygodactylus bernardi V. FitzSimons, 1958 – Bernard's dwarf gecko, FitzSimon's dwarf gecko
- Lygodactylus bivittis (W. Peters, 1883) – tiny scaled gecko
- Lygodactylus blancae G. Pasteur, 1995 ‡
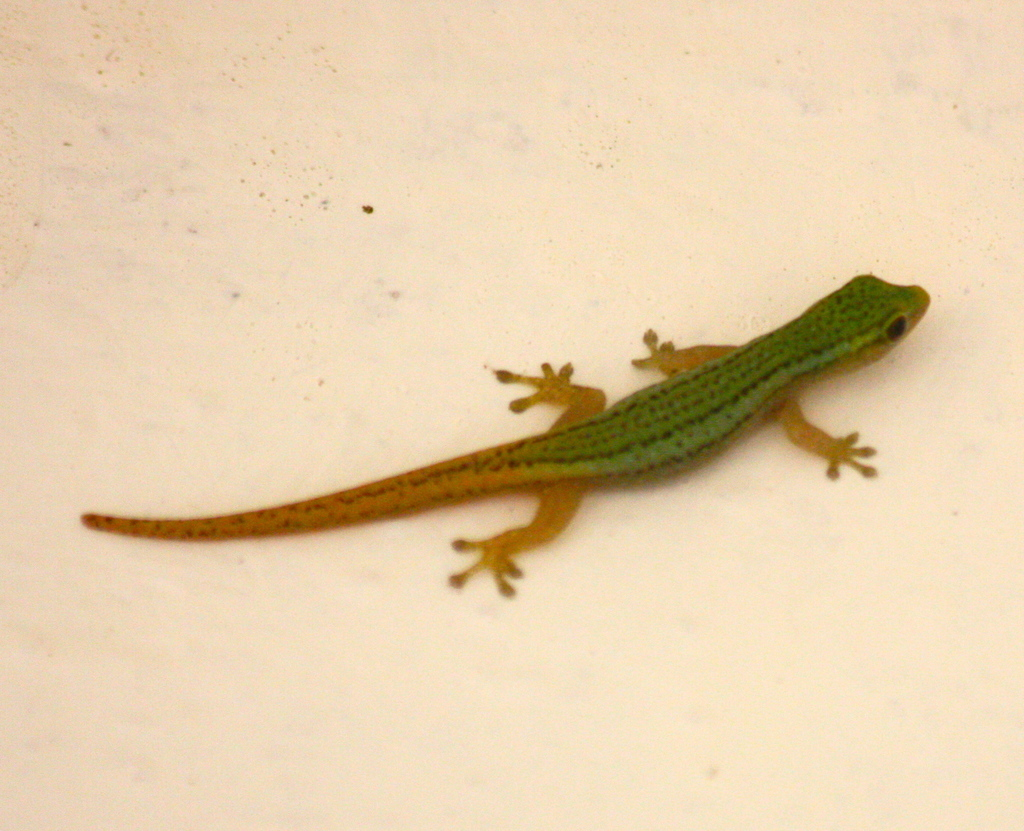
  Cameroon dwarf gecko (Lygodactylus conraui)
- Lygodactylus blanci G. Pasteur, 1967 ‡ – Blanc's dwarf gecko
- Lygodactylus bonsi G. Pasteur, 1962 – Bons's dwarf day gecko
- Lygodactylus bradfieldi Hewitt, 1932 – Bradfield's dwarf gecko
- Lygodactylus broadleyi G. Pasteur, 1995 – Broadley's dwarf gecko
- Lygodactylus capensis (A. Smith, 1849) – Cape dwarf gecko, common dwarf gecko
- Lygodactylus chobiensis V. FitzSimons, 1932 – Okavango dwarf gecko, Chobe dwarf gecko
- Lygodactylus conradti Matschie, 1892 – Matschie's dwarf gecko, Conradt's dwarf gecko
- Lygodactylus conraui Tornier, 1902 – Cameroon dwarf gecko
- Lygodactylus decaryi Angel, 1930 – Angel's dwarf gecko
- Lygodactylus depressus K.P. Schmidt, 1919 – Zaire dwarf gecko
- Lygodactylus expectatus G. Pasteur & C. Blanc, 1967 – Ambilobe dwarf gecko
- Lygodactylus fischeri Boulenger, 1890 – Fischer's dwarf gecko
- Lygodactylus fritzi Vences, Multsch, Gippner, Miralles, Crottini, Gehring, Rakotoarison, Ratsoavina, Glaw & Scherz, 2022
- Lygodactylus grandisonae G. Pasteur, 1962 – Kenya dwarf gecko, Bunty's dwarf gecko, Grandison's dwarf gecko
- Lygodactylus graniticolus Jacobsen, 1992 – granite dwarf gecko
- Lygodactylus gravis G. Pasteur, 1965 – Usambara dwarf gecko
- Lygodactylus grotei Sternfeld, 1911 – Grote's dwarf gecko
- Lygodactylus guibei G. Pasteur, 1965 – western dwarf gecko
- Lygodactylus gutturalis (Bocage, 1873) – Uganda dwarf gecko, chevron-throated dwarf gecko
- Lygodactylus hapei Vences, Multzsch, Gippner, Miralles, Crottini, Gehring, Rakotoarison, Ratsoavina, Glaw & Scherz, 2022
- Lygodactylus heeneni de Witte, 1933
- Lygodactylus heterurus Boettger, 1913 – Boettger's dwarf gecko
- Lygodactylus hodikazo Vences, Multzsch, Gippner, Miralles, Crottini, Gehring, Rakotoarison, Ratsoavina, Glaw & Scherz, 2022
- Lygodactylus incognitus Jacobsen, 1992 – cryptic dwarf gecko
- Lygodactylus inexpectatus G. Pasteur, 1965 – Dar es Salaam dwarf gecko
- Lygodactylus insularis Boettger, 1913 – insular dwarf gecko
- Lygodactylus intermedius G. Pasteur, 1995
- Lygodactylus karamoja Lobón-Rovira et al., 2023 – Karamoja dwarf gecko
- Lygodactylus keniensis Parker, 1936 – Parker's dwarf gecko, Kenya dwarf gecko
- Lygodactylus kimhowelli G. Pasteur, 1995 – Kim Howell's dwarf gecko, Tanzanian dwarf gecko, zebra dwarf gecko
- Lygodactylus klemmeri G. Pasteur, 1965 – Malagasy dwarf gecko, Klemmer's dwarf gecko
- Lygodactylus klugei (H.M. Smith, R.L. Martin & Swain, 1977) – Kluge's dwarf gecko
- Lygodactylus laterimaculatus G. Pasteur, 1964 – side-spotted dwarf gecko
- Lygodactylus lawrencei Hewitt, 1926 – Lawrence's dwarf gecko
- Lygodactylus lobeke Röll, Pinto & Lobón-Rovira, 2024 – Lobeke dwarf gecko
- Lygodactylus luteopicturatus G. Pasteur, 1964 – dwarf yellow-headed gecko, yellow-headed dwarf gecko
- Lygodactylus madagascariensis (Boettger, 1881) – Madagascar dwarf gecko
- Lygodactylus manni Loveridge, 1928 – Mann's dwarf gecko
- Lygodactylus methueni V. FitzSimons, 1937 – Methuen's dwarf gecko, Woodbrush dwarf gecko
- Lygodactylus miops Günther, 1891 – Günther's dwarf gecko
- Lygodactylus mirabilis (G. Pasteur, 1962)
- Lygodactylus mombasicus Loveridge, 1935 – white-headed dwarf gecko
- Lygodactylus montanus G. Pasteur, 1965 – Mount Ivohibe gecko
- Lygodactylus montiscaeruli Jacobsen, 1992 – Makgabeng dwarf gecko
- Lygodactylus nigropunctatus Jacobsen, 1992 – black-spotted dwarf gecko
- Lygodactylus nyaneka Marques, Ceríaco, Buehler, Bandeira, Janota & Bauer, 2020
- Lygodactylus ocellatus Roux, 1907 – ocellated dwarf gecko, spotted dwarf gecko
- Lygodactylus ornatus G. Pasteur, 1965 – ornate dwarf gecko
- Lygodactylus pauliani G. Pasteur & C. Blanc, 1991 – ornate dwarf gecko

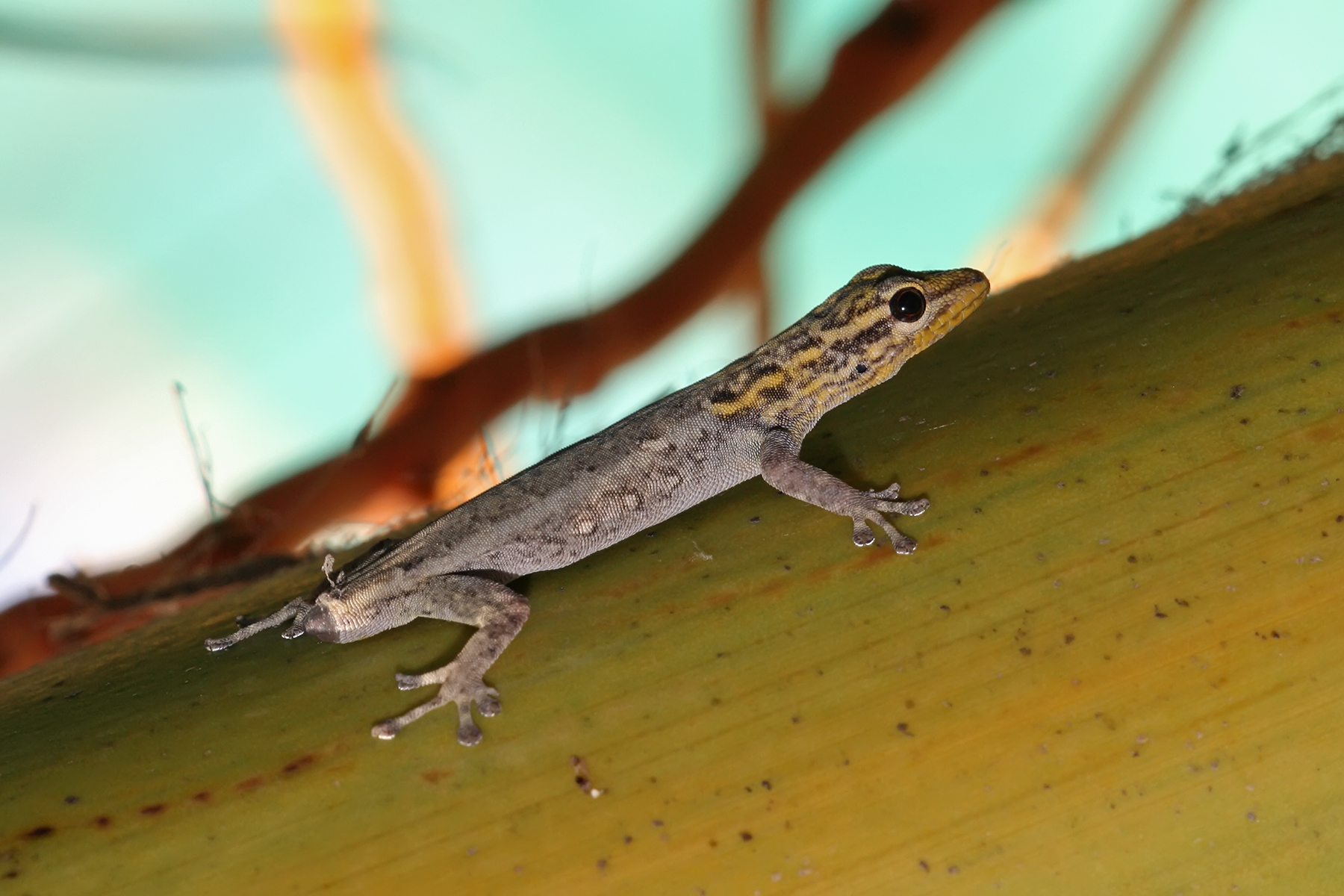
Lygodactylus picturatus in Dar es Salaam, Tanzania. The tail has been detached due to a self-defense mechanism known as autotomy.

- Lygodactylus petteri G. Pasteur & C. Blanc, 1967 – Petter’s dwarf gecko
- Lygodactylus picturatus (W. Peters, 1871) – white-headed dwarf gecko, painted dwarf gecko
- Lygodactylus pictus (W. Peters, 1883) – robust dwarf gecko
- Lygodactylus rarus G. Pasteur & C. Blanc, 1973 – thin dwarf gecko
- Lygodactylus regulus Portik, Travers, Bauer & Branch, 2013 – prince dwarf gecko
- Lygodactylus rex Broadley, 1963 – king dwarf gecko
- Lygodactylus roavolana Puente, Glaw, Vieites & Vences, 2009
- Lygodactylus roellae Vences, Multzsch, Gippner, Miralles, Crottini, Gehring, Rakotoarison, Ratsoavina, Glaw & Scherz, 2022
- Lygodactylus salvi Vences, Multzsch, Gippner, Miralles, Crottini, Gehring, Rakotoarison, Ratsoavina, Glaw & Scherz, 2022
- Lygodactylus scheffleri Sternfeld, 1912 – Scheffler's dwarf gecko
- Lygodactylus scorteccii G. Pasteur, 1959 – Scortecci's dwarf gecko
- Lygodactylus somalicus Loveridge, 1935 – Somali dwarf gecko
- Lygodactylus soutpansbergensis Jacobsen, 1994 – Soutpansberg dwarf gecko
- Lygodactylus stevensoni Hewitt, 1926 – Stevenson's dwarf gecko
- Lygodactylus tantsaha Vences, Multzsch, Gippner, Miralles, Crottini, Gehring, Rakotoarison, Ratsoavina, Glaw & Scherz, 2022
- Lygodactylus tchokwe Marques, Ceríaco, Buehler, Bandeira, Janota & Bauer, 2020
- Lygodactylus thomensis (W. Peters, 1881) – Annobon dwarf gecko
- Lygodactylus tolampyae (Grandidier, 1872) – Grandidier's dwarf gecko
- Lygodactylus tsavoensis Malonza, Bauer, Granthon, D. Williams & Wojnowski, 2019 – Tsavo dwarf gecko
- Lygodactylus tuberosus Mertens, 1965
- Lygodactylus ulli Vences, Multzsch, Gippner, Miralles, Crottini, Gehring, Rakotoarison, Ratsoavina, Glaw & Scherz, 2022
- Lygodactylus verticillatus Mocquard, 1895 – Mocquard's dwarf gecko
- Lygodactylus viscatus (Vaillant, 1873) – Howell's dwarf gecko, Copal dwarf gecko
- Lygodactylus waterbergensis Jacobsen, 1992 – Waterberg dwarf gecko
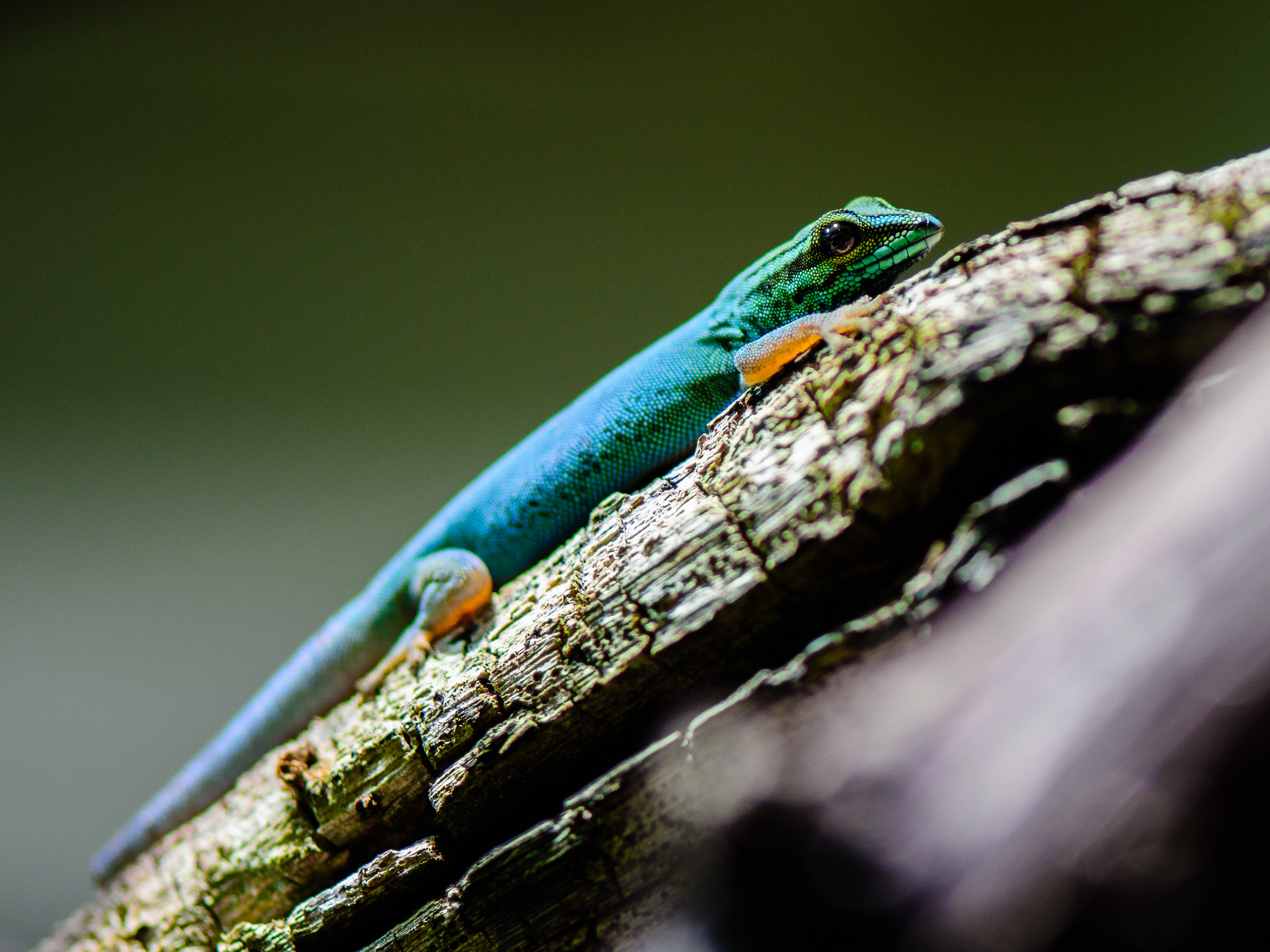
  Electric blue dwarf gecko (Lygodactylus williamsi)
- Lygodactylus wetzeli (H.M. Smith, R.L. Martin & Swain, 1977) – South American dwarf gecko
- Lygodactylus williamsi Loveridge, 1952 – Williams' dwarf gecko, turquoise dwarf gecko, electric blue gecko
- Lygodactylus winki Vences, Multzsch, Gippner, Miralles, Crottini, Gehring, Rakotoarison, Ratsoavina, Glaw & Scherz, 2022
- Lygodactylus wojnowskii Malonza, Granthon & D. Williams, 2016 – Mt. Kenya dwarf gecko

‡ L. blancae (feminine, genitive, singular) is named for (Ms) Françoise Blanc, a French geneticist; but L. blanci (masculine, genitive, singular) is named for (Mr.) Charles Pierre Blanc, a French herpetologist.

Nota bene: A binomial authority in parentheses indicates that the species was original described in a genus other than Lygodactylus.
