= Lygodactylus mirabilis =

Conservation status
- Critically Endangered (IUCN 3.1)

Scientific classification
- Kingdom: Animalia
- Phylum: Chordata
- Class: Reptilia
- Order: Squamata
- Suborder: Gekkota
- Family: Gekkonidae
- Genus: Lygodactylus
- Species: L. mirabilis

Binomial name
- Lygodactylus mirabilis (Pasteur, 1962)
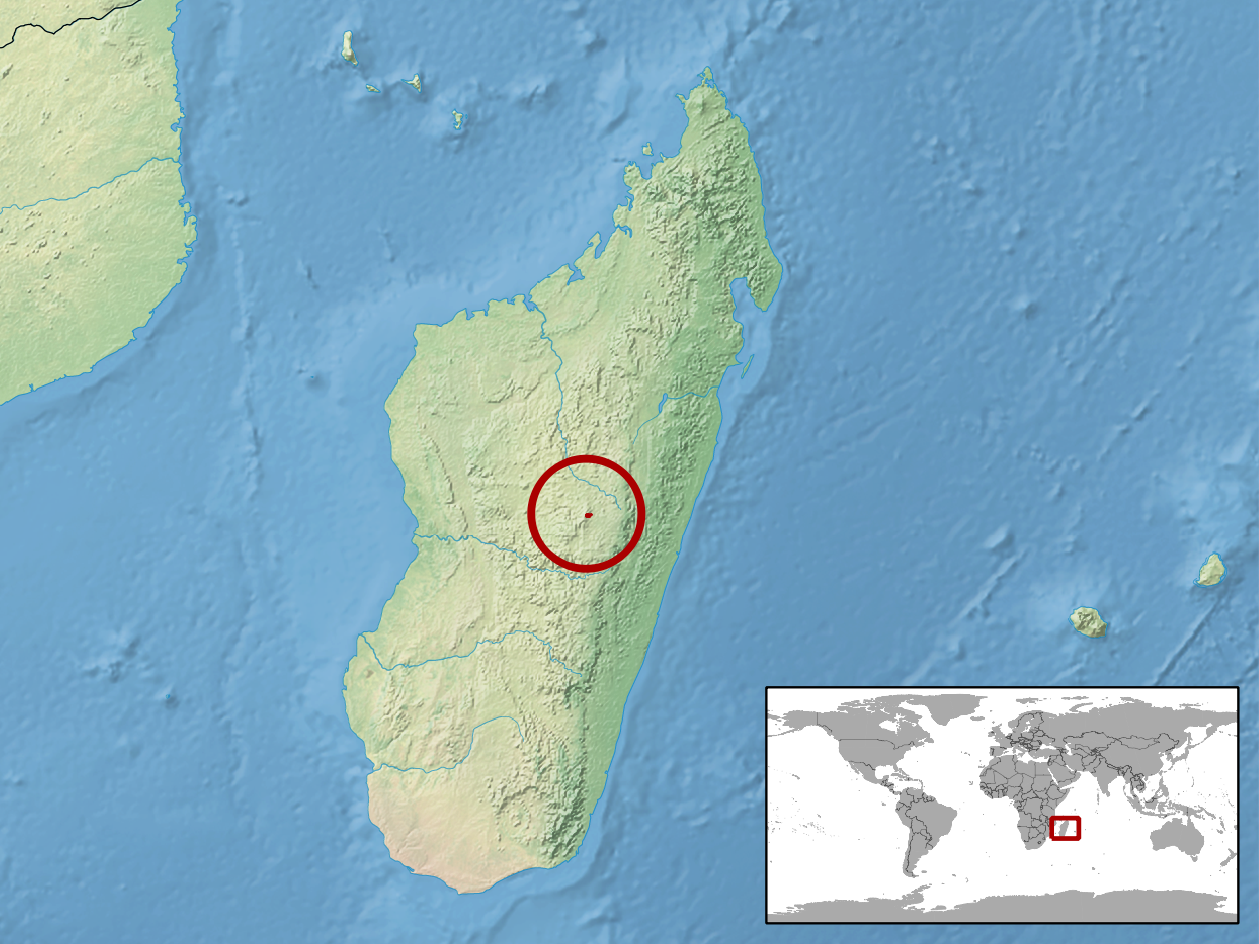

Species of forest lizard

Lygodactylus mirabilis is a species of gecko endemic to Madagascar.
