= Insular dwarf gecko =

Scientific classification
- Domain: Eukaryota
- Kingdom: Animalia
- Phylum: Chordata
- Class: Reptilia
- Order: Squamata
- Infraorder: Gekkota
- Family: Gekkonidae
- Genus: Lygodactylus
- Species: L. insularis

Binomial name
- Lygodactylus insularis Boettger, 1913

Species of lizard

The insular dwarf gecko (Lygodactylus insularis) is a species of gecko endemic to Juan de Nova Island (Mozambique).
