= Lygodactylus tuberosus =

Conservation status
- Least Concern (IUCN 3.1)

Scientific classification
- Kingdom: Animalia
- Phylum: Chordata
- Class: Reptilia
- Order: Squamata
- Suborder: Gekkota
- Family: Gekkonidae
- Genus: Lygodactylus
- Species: L. tuberosus

Binomial name
- Lygodactylus tuberosus Mertens, 1965
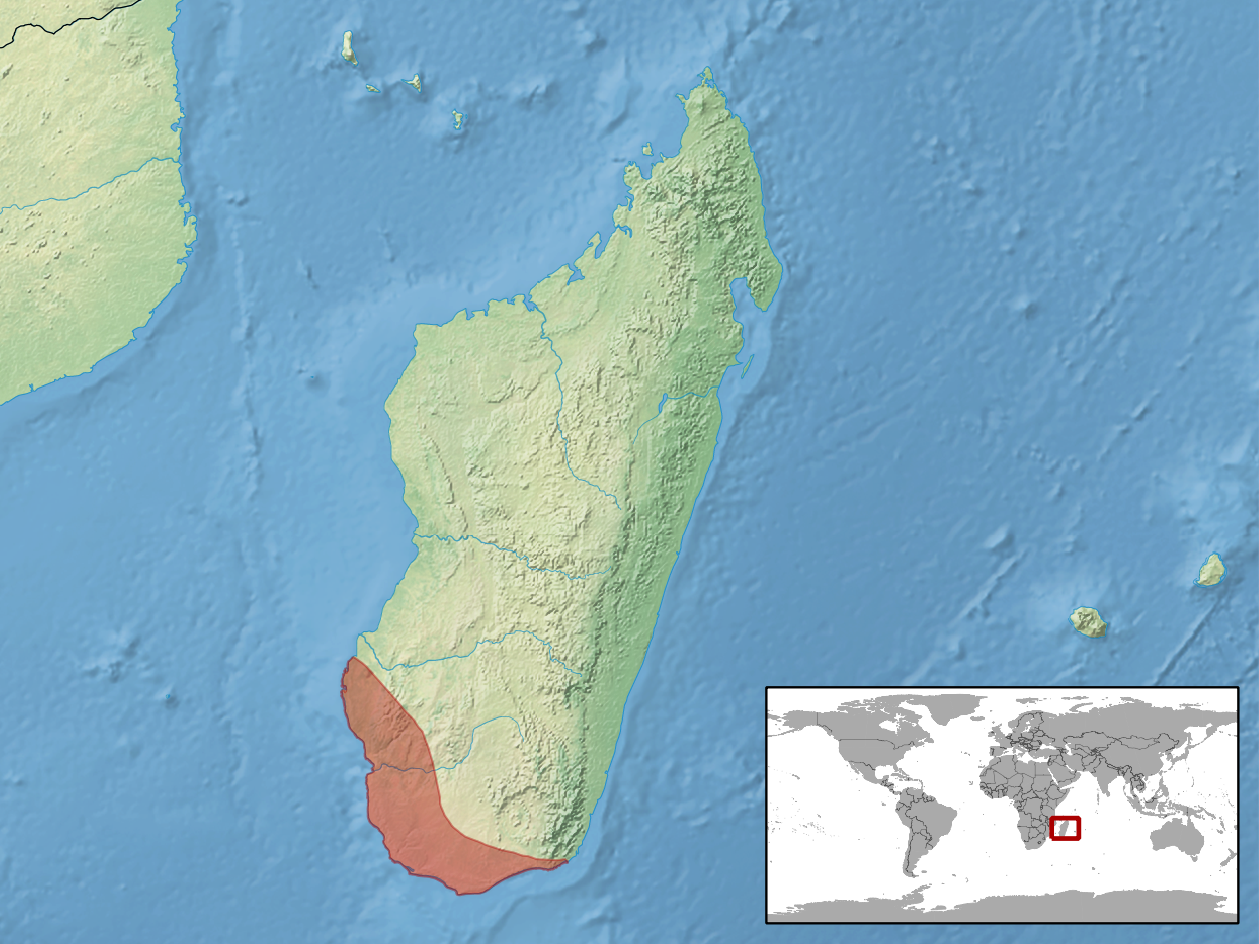

Species of lizard

Lygodactylus tuberosus is a species of gecko endemic to southwestern Madagascar.
