= Somali dwarf gecko =

Scientific classification
- Domain: Eukaryota
- Kingdom: Animalia
- Phylum: Chordata
- Class: Reptilia
- Order: Squamata
- Infraorder: Gekkota
- Family: Gekkonidae
- Genus: Lygodactylus
- Species: L. somalicus

Binomial name
- Lygodactylus somalicus Loveridge, 1935

Species of lizard

The Somali dwarf gecko (Lygodactylus somalicus) is a species of gecko found in northern Kenya, Somalia and Ethiopia.
