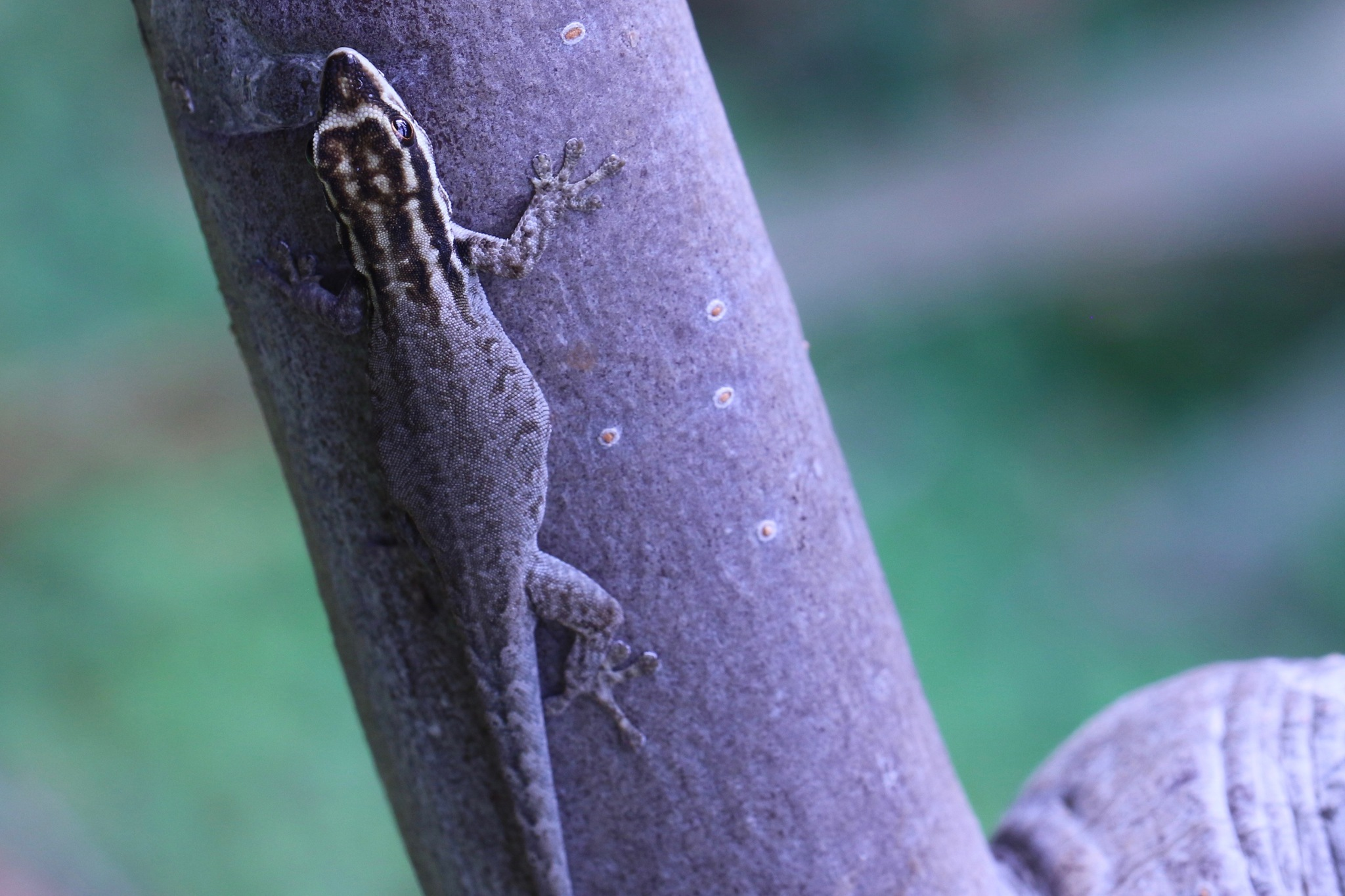

Scientific classification
- Kingdom: Animalia
- Phylum: Chordata
- Class: Reptilia
- Order: Squamata
- Suborder: Gekkota
- Family: Gekkonidae
- Genus: Lygodactylus
- Species: L. wojnowskii

Binomial name
- Lygodactylus wojnowskii Malonza, Granthon & D. Williams, 2016

= Mount Kenya dwarf gecko =

Species of lizard

The Mount Kenya dwarf gecko (Lygodactylus wojnowskii) is a species of lizard in the family Gekkonidae. The species is endemic to Kenya.

== Etymology ==
The specific name, wojnowskii, is in honor of American herpetologist David Wojnowski.

== Habitat ==
The preferred habitat of L. wojnowskii is shrubs and trees, including fruit trees such as citrus, mango, and pawpaw.

== Behavior ==
L. wojnowskii is arboreal, agile, and able to jump from branch to branch.
