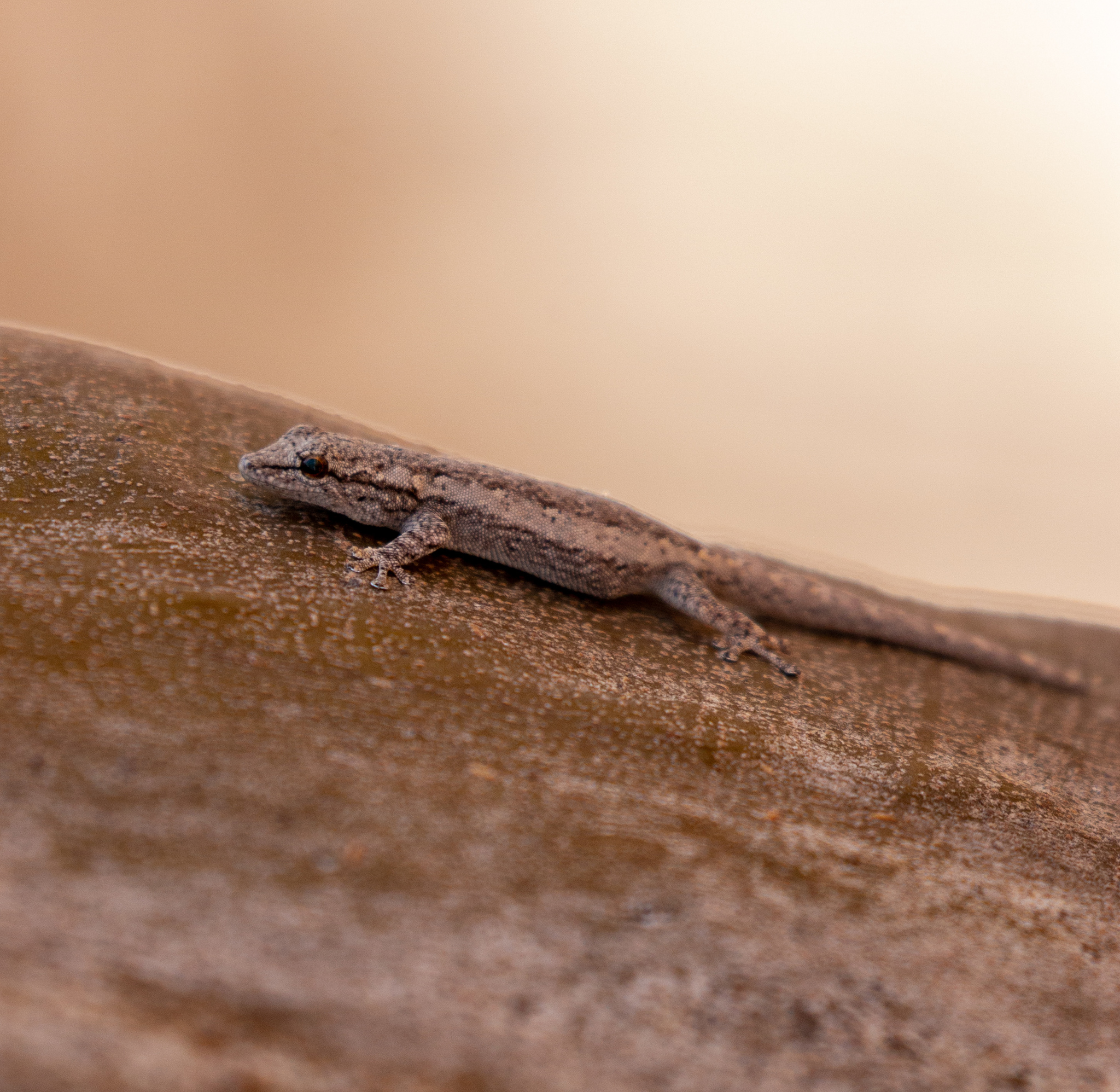

Conservation status
- Least Concern (IUCN 3.1)

Scientific classification
- Kingdom: Animalia
- Phylum: Chordata
- Class: Reptilia
- Order: Squamata
- Suborder: Gekkota
- Family: Gekkonidae
- Genus: Lygodactylus
- Species: L. klugei

Binomial name
- Lygodactylus klugei (H.M. Smith, R.L. Martin & Swain, 1977)

Synonyms
- Vanzoia klugei H.M. Smith, R.L. Martin & Swain, 1977; Lygodactylus klugei — Bons & Pasteur, 1977

= Kluge's dwarf gecko =

Species of lizard

Kluge's dwarf gecko (Lygodactylus klugei) is a species of gecko, a lizard in the family Gekkonidae. The species is native to northeastern Brazil.

== Etymology ==
The specific name, klugei, is in honor of American herpetologist Arnold G. Kluge.

== Geographic range ==
L. klugei is found in the Brazilian States of Bahia, Ceará, Piauí, and Rio Grande do Norte.

== Habitat ==
The preferred natural habitat of L. klugei is savanna.

== Diet ==
L. klugei mainly preys upon insects and spiders, but it also eats nectar.

== Reproduction ==
L. klugei is oviparous.
