= Angola dwarf gecko =

Scientific classification
- Kingdom: Animalia
- Phylum: Chordata
- Class: Reptilia
- Order: Squamata
- Suborder: Gekkota
- Family: Gekkonidae
- Genus: Lygodactylus
- Species: L. angolensis

Binomial name
- Lygodactylus angolensis Bocage, 1896

Synonyms
- Lygodactylus laurae

Species of lizard

The Angola dwarf gecko (Lygodactylus angolensis) is a species of gecko native to southern Africa, where geckos in general have a high diversity. It is likely that they originated from Madagascar. They have been found in Angola, Zimbabwe, Tanzania, South Africa, the Democratic Republic of the Congo, Mozambique, Botswana, and Namibia. They were first named by José Vicente Barbosa du Bocage in 1896.
