= Lygodactylus pauliani =

Conservation status
- Data Deficient (IUCN 3.1)

Scientific classification
- Kingdom: Animalia
- Phylum: Chordata
- Class: Reptilia
- Order: Squamata
- Suborder: Gekkota
- Family: Gekkonidae
- Genus: Lygodactylus
- Species: L. pauliani

Binomial name
- Lygodactylus pauliani Pasteur & Blanc, 1991
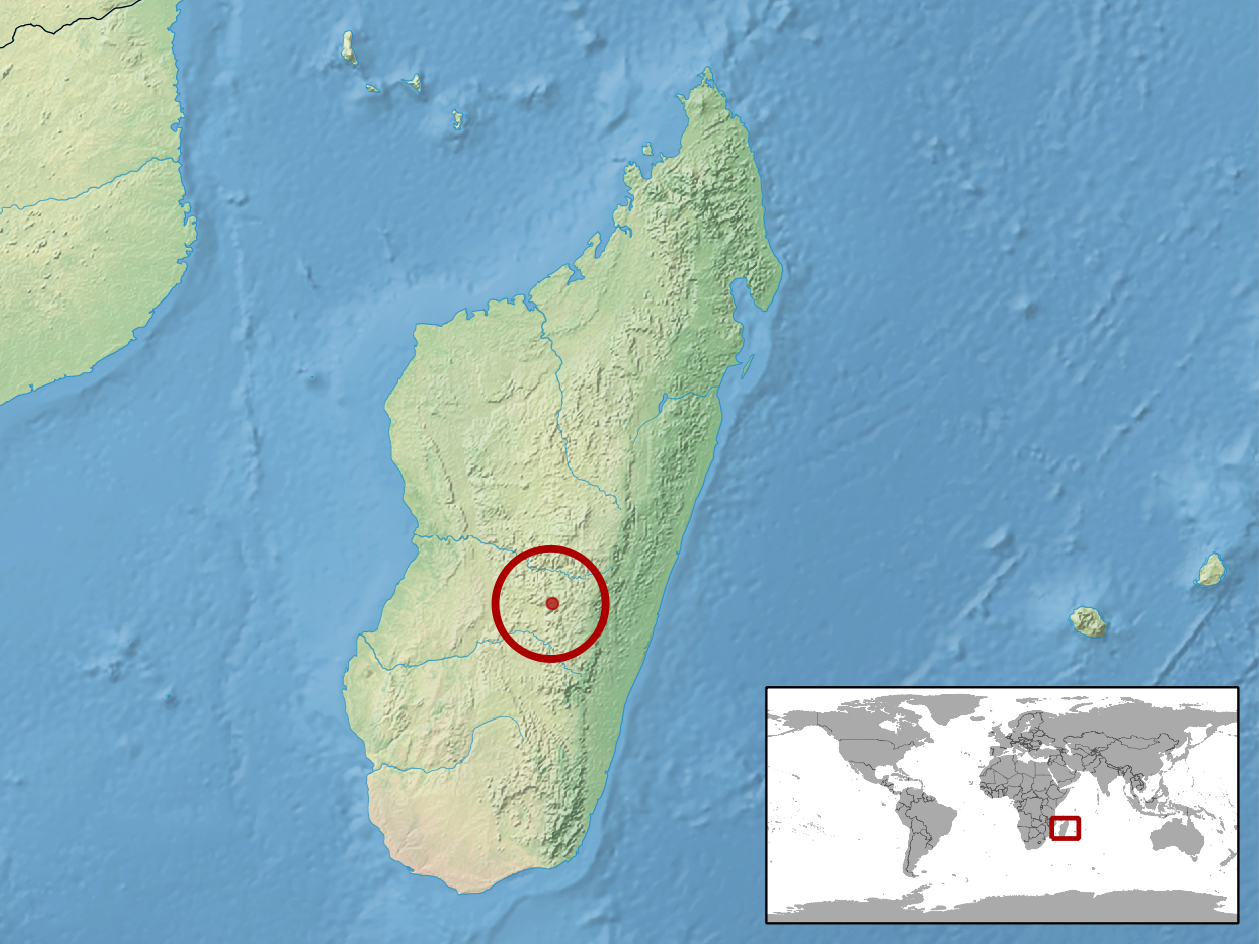

Species of lizard

Lygodactylus pauliani is a species of gecko, a lizard in the family Gekkonidae. The species is endemic to Madagascar.

== Etymology ==
The specific name, pauliani, is in honor of French entomologist Renaud Paulian.

== Geographic range ==
Lygodactylus pauliani is found in southeastern Madagascar. The holotype was collected at an elevation of 1,100 m (3,600 ft).

== Habitat ==
The natural habitats of Lygodactylus pauliani are forest, grassland, rocky areas, and shrubland.

== Reproduction ==
Lygodactylus pauliani is oviparous.
