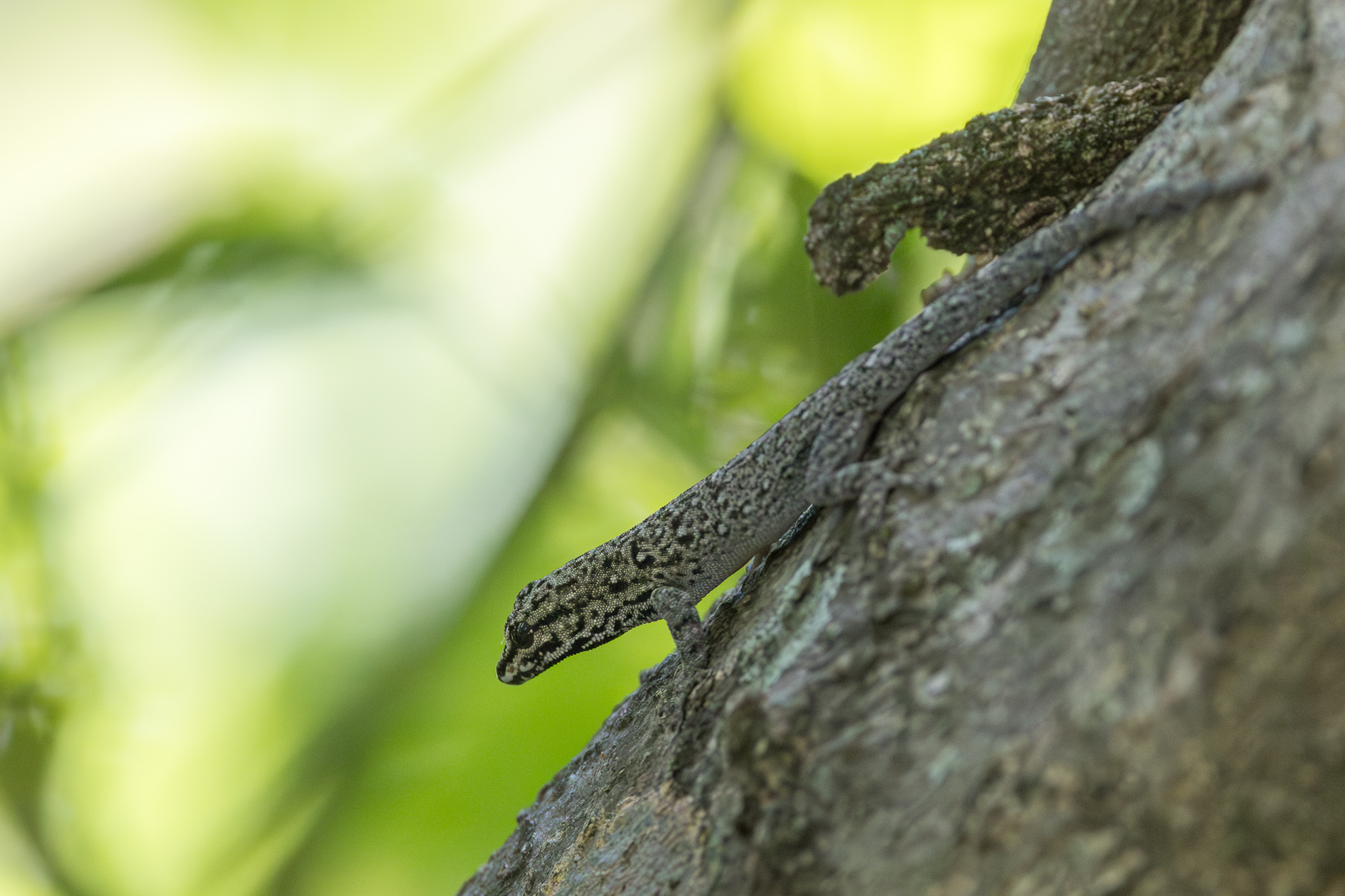

Conservation status
- Least Concern (IUCN 3.1)

Scientific classification
- Kingdom: Animalia
- Phylum: Chordata
- Class: Reptilia
- Order: Squamata
- Suborder: Gekkota
- Family: Gekkonidae
- Genus: Lygodactylus
- Species: L. keniensis

Binomial name
- Lygodactylus keniensis Parker, 1936

Synonyms
- Lygodactylus picturatus keniensis

= Lygodactylus keniensis =

Species of lizard

Lygodactylus keniensis, also known as Parker's dwarf gecko or Kenya dwarf gecko, is a species of gecko found in northern Kenya, southern Somalia, southern Ethiopia, and eastern Uganda.
