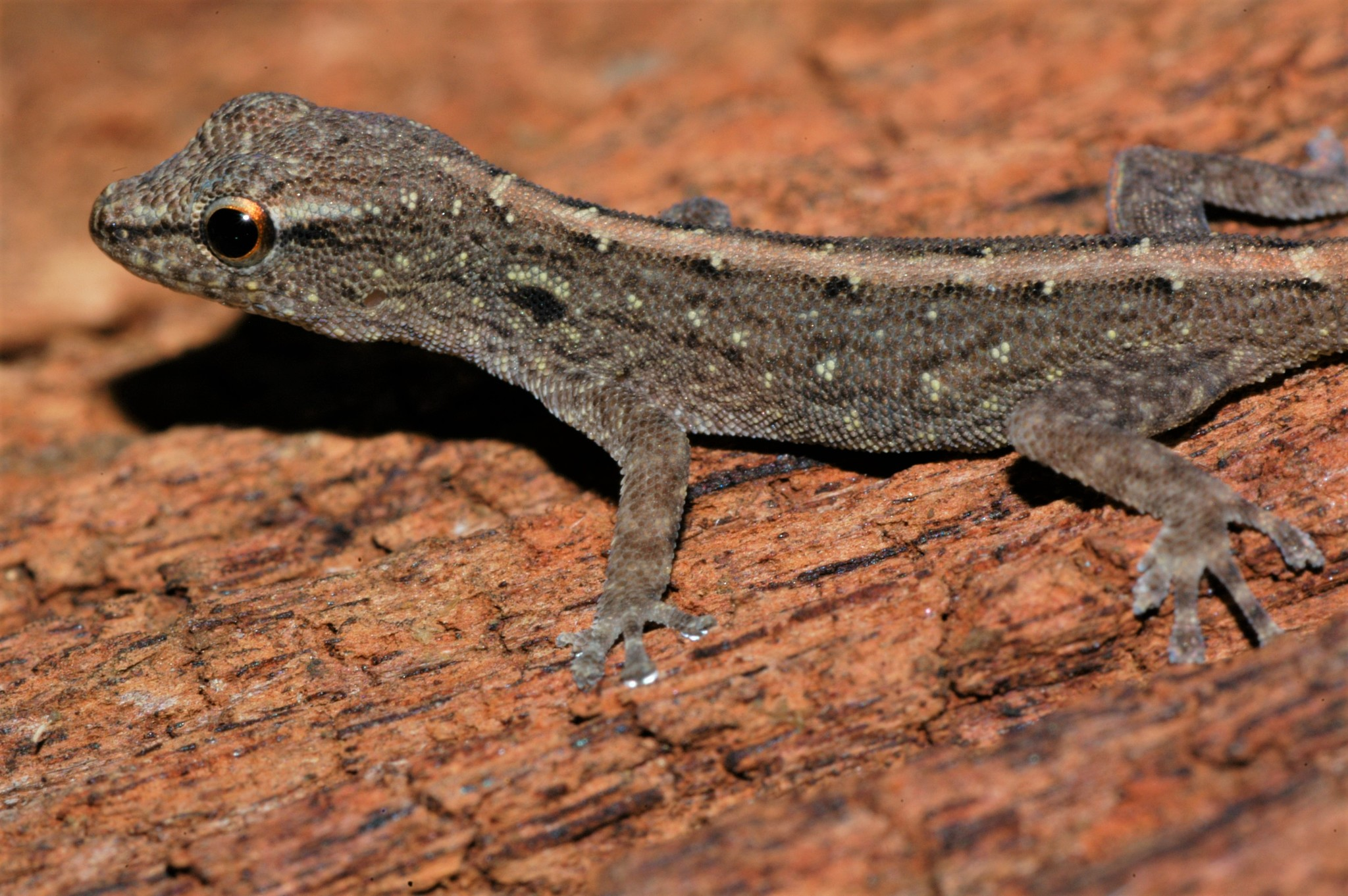

Conservation status
- Near Threatened (IUCN 3.1)

Scientific classification
- Kingdom: Animalia
- Phylum: Chordata
- Class: Reptilia
- Order: Squamata
- Suborder: Gekkota
- Family: Gekkonidae
- Genus: Lygodactylus
- Species: L. expectatus

Binomial name
- Lygodactylus expectatus Pasteur & Blanc, 1967
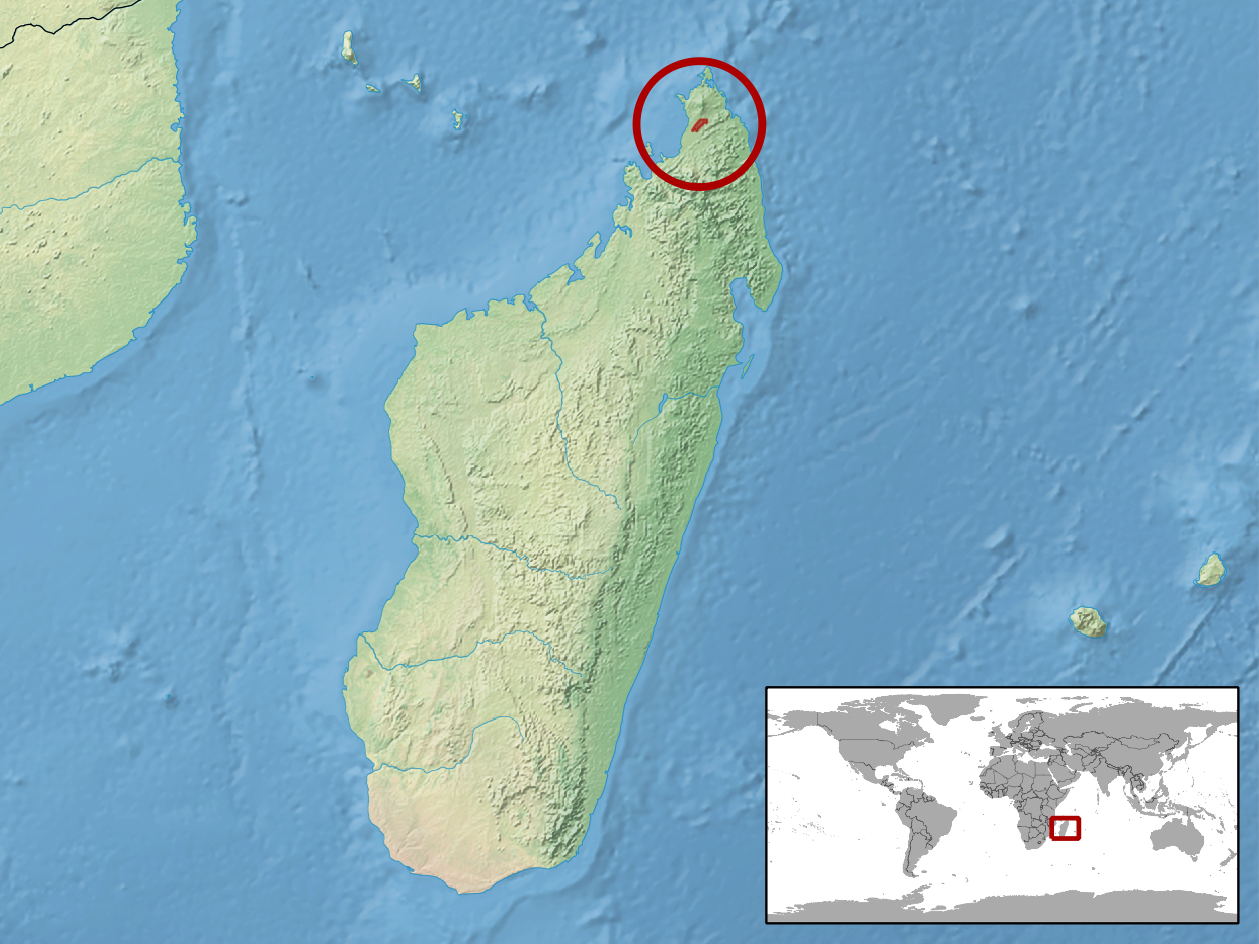

= Ambilobe dwarf gecko =

Species of lizard

The Ambilobe dwarf gecko (Lygodactylus expectatus) is a species of gecko endemic to Madagascar.
