= Boettger's dwarf gecko =

Conservation status
- Least Concern (IUCN 3.1)

Scientific classification
- Kingdom: Animalia
- Phylum: Chordata
- Class: Reptilia
- Order: Squamata
- Suborder: Gekkota
- Family: Gekkonidae
- Genus: Lygodactylus
- Species: L. heterurus

Binomial name
- Lygodactylus heterurus Boettger, 1913
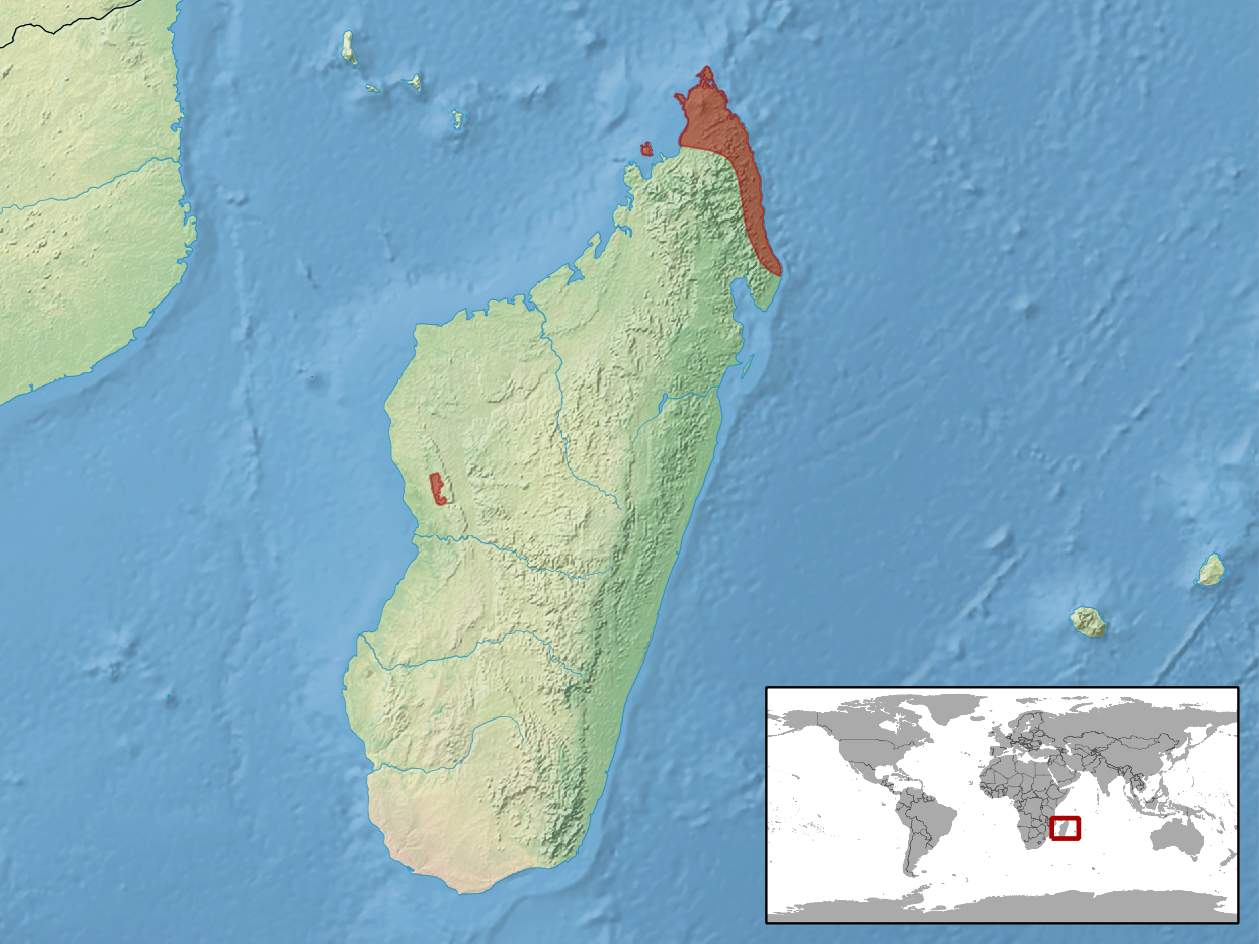

Species of lizard

Boettger's dwarf gecko (Lygodactylus heterurus) is a species of gecko endemic to Madagascar.
