= Lygodactylus petteri =

Scientific classification
- Kingdom: Animalia
- Phylum: Chordata
- Class: Reptilia
- Order: Squamata
- Suborder: Gekkota
- Family: Gekkonidae
- Genus: Lygodactylus
- Species: L. petteri

Binomial name
- Lygodactylus petteri Pasteur & Blanc. 1967

Species of lizard

Lygodactylus petteri, Petter’s dwarf gecko, is a species of gecko endemic to Madagascar.
