= Broadley's dwarf gecko =

Scientific classification
- Kingdom: Animalia
- Phylum: Chordata
- Class: Reptilia
- Order: Squamata
- Suborder: Gekkota
- Family: Gekkonidae
- Genus: Lygodactylus
- Species: L. broadleyi

Binomial name
- Lygodactylus broadleyi G. Pasteur, 1995

Species of lizard

Broadley's dwarf gecko (Lygodactylus broadleyi) is a species of lizard in the family Gekkonidae. The species is native to East Africa.

== Etymology ==
The specific name, broadleyi, is in honor of African herpetologist Donald George Broadley.

== Geographic range ==
L. broadleyi is found in Kenya and Tanzania.

== Description ==
The maximum recorded snout-to-vent length for L. broadleyi is 2.3 cm (0.91 in).

== Reproduction ==
L. broadleyi is oviparous.
