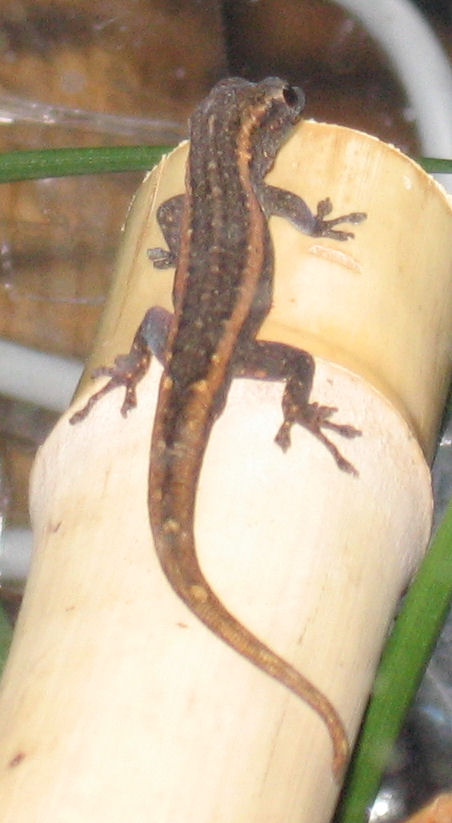
- Captive Lygodactylus conradti

Conservation status
- Data Deficient (IUCN 3.1)

Scientific classification
- Kingdom: Animalia
- Phylum: Chordata
- Class: Reptilia
- Order: Squamata
- Suborder: Gekkota
- Family: Gekkonidae
- Genus: Lygodactylus
- Species: L. conradti

Binomial name
- Lygodactylus conradti Matschie, 1892

= Matschie's dwarf gecko =

Species of lizard

Matschie's dwarf gecko (Lygodactylus conradti), also known commonly as Conradt's dwarf gecko, is a species of lizard in the family Gekkonidae. The species is native to East Africa. There are no valid subspecies.

== Etymology ==
The specific name, conradti, is in honor of Leopold Conradt, collector of the holotype.

== Geographic range ==
L. conradti is found in northeastern Tanzania and Kenya.

== Habitat ==
The preferred natural habitat of L. conradti is forest, at altitudes of 1,000–1,200 m (3,300–3,900 ft).

== Behavior ==
L. conradti is diurnal and arboreal.

== Diet ==
L. conradti eats fruit and preys upon small insects.

== Reproduction ==
L. conradti is oviparous. Clutch size is two eggs.
