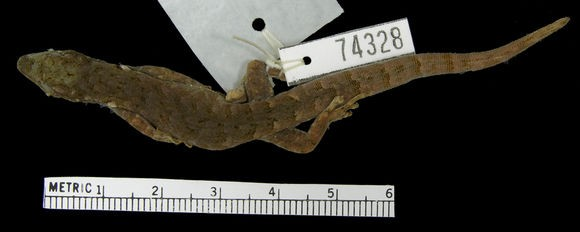

Scientific classification
- Kingdom: Animalia
- Phylum: Chordata
- Class: Reptilia
- Order: Squamata
- Suborder: Gekkota
- Family: Gekkonidae
- Genus: Lygodactylus
- Species: L. rex

Binomial name
- Lygodactylus rex Broadley, 1963

= King dwarf gecko =

Species of lizard

The king dwarf gecko (Lygodactylus rex) is a rare species of dwarf gecko native to southeast Africa (Malawi, Mozambique). Its total length is 7 to 9 inches, more than half of which is its tail.
