= Waterberg dwarf gecko =

Conservation status
- Least Concern (IUCN 3.1)

Scientific classification
- Kingdom: Animalia
- Phylum: Chordata
- Class: Reptilia
- Order: Squamata
- Suborder: Gekkota
- Family: Gekkonidae
- Genus: Lygodactylus
- Species: L. waterbergensis

Binomial name
- Lygodactylus waterbergensis Jacobsen, 1992

Species of lizard

The Waterberg dwarf gecko (Lygodactylus waterbergensis) is a species of gecko endemic to Limpopo in South Africa.
