= Mount Ivohibe gecko =

Conservation status
- Least Concern (IUCN 3.1)

Scientific classification
- Kingdom: Animalia
- Phylum: Chordata
- Class: Reptilia
- Order: Squamata
- Suborder: Gekkota
- Family: Gekkonidae
- Genus: Lygodactylus
- Species: L. montanus

Binomial name
- Lygodactylus montanus Pasteur, 1965
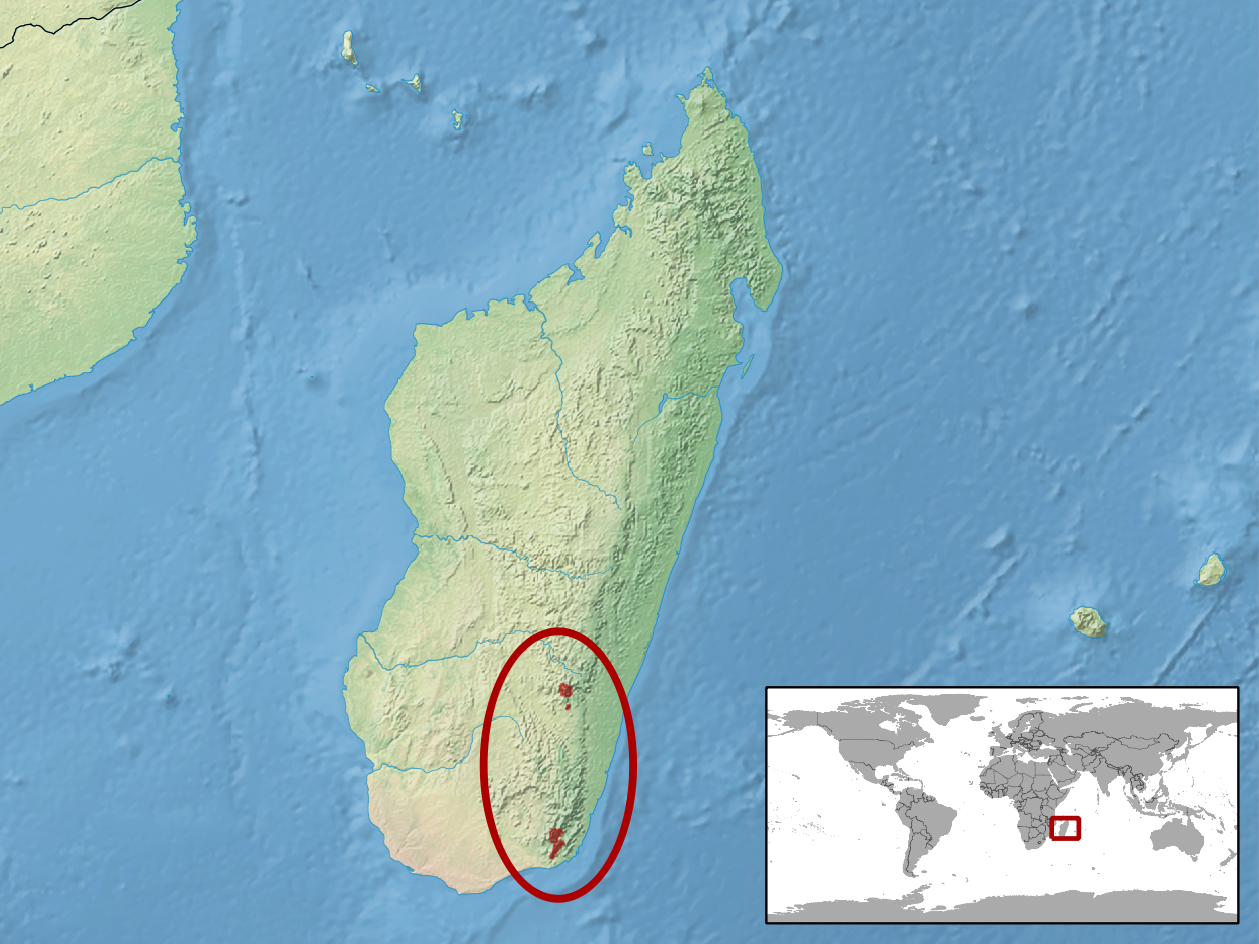

Species of lizard

The Mount Ivohibe gecko (Lygodactylus montanus) is a species of gecko endemic to southeastern Madagascar.
