= Dar-es-Salaam dwarf gecko =

Conservation status
- Data Deficient (IUCN 3.1)

Scientific classification
- Kingdom: Animalia
- Phylum: Chordata
- Class: Reptilia
- Order: Squamata
- Suborder: Gekkota
- Family: Gekkonidae
- Genus: Lygodactylus
- Species: L. inexpectatus

Binomial name
- Lygodactylus inexpectatus Pasteur, 1965

Species of lizard

The Dar-es-Salaam dwarf gecko (Lygodactylus inexpectatus) is a species of gecko endemic to Tanzania.
