= Scortecci's dwarf gecko =

Scientific classification
- Kingdom: Animalia
- Phylum: Chordata
- Class: Reptilia
- Order: Squamata
- Suborder: Gekkota
- Family: Gekkonidae
- Genus: Lygodactylus
- Species: L. scorteccii

Binomial name
- Lygodactylus scorteccii G. Pasteur, 1959

Synonyms
- Lygodactylus picturatus scorteccii G. Pasteur, 1959; Lygodactylus scorteccii — Kluge, 1993; Lygodactylus (Lygodactylus) scorteccii — Rösler, 2000

Species of lizard

Scortecci's dwarf gecko (Lygodactylus scorteccii) is a species of lizard in the family Gekkonidae. The species is native to East Africa.

== Etymology ==
The specific name, scorteccii, is in honor of Italian herpetologist Giuseppe Scortecci.

== Geographic range ==
L. scorteccii is found in Ethiopia, northwestern Kenya, and Somalia.

== Reproduction ==
L. scorteccii is oviparous.
