= Lygodactylus grandisonae =

Conservation status
- Data Deficient (IUCN 3.1)

Scientific classification
- Kingdom: Animalia
- Phylum: Chordata
- Class: Reptilia
- Order: Squamata
- Suborder: Gekkota
- Family: Gekkonidae
- Genus: Lygodactylus
- Species: L. grandisonae

Binomial name
- Lygodactylus grandisonae G. Pasteur, 1962
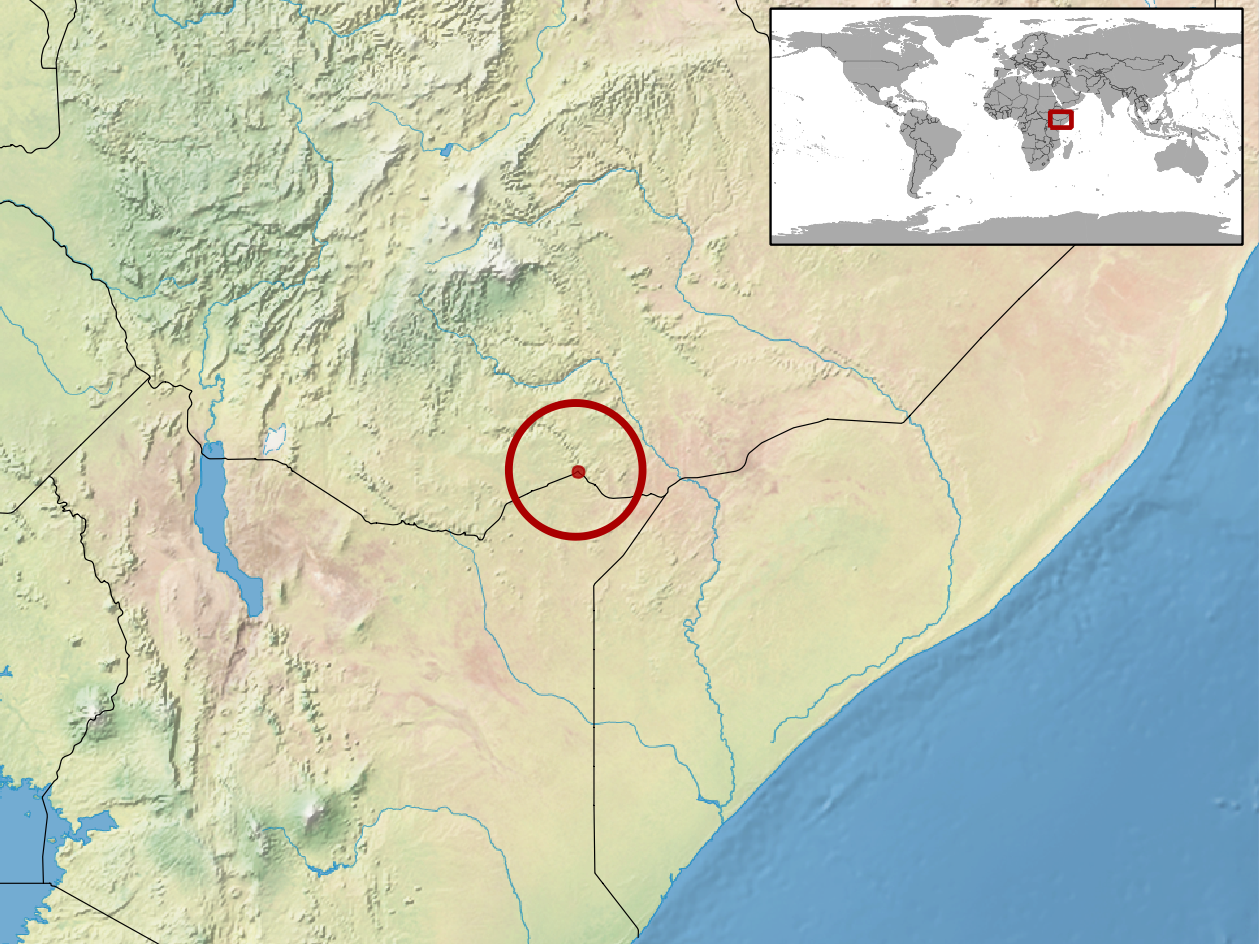

Species of lizard

Lygodactylus grandisonae, also known commonly as Bunty's dwarf gecko, Grandison's dwarf gecko, and the Kenya dwarf gecko, is a species of lizard in the family Gekkonidae. The species is native to East Africa and the Horn of Africa.

== Etymology ==
The specific name, grandisonae, is in honor of British herpetologist Alice Georgie Cruickshank "Bunty" Grandison (1927–2014).

== Geographic range ==
L. grandisonae is found in Ethiopia and Kenya.

== Habitat ==
The preferred natural habitat of Lygodactylus grandisonae is savanna, at an altitude of 800 m (2,600 ft).

== Reproduction ==
L. grandisonae is oviparous.
