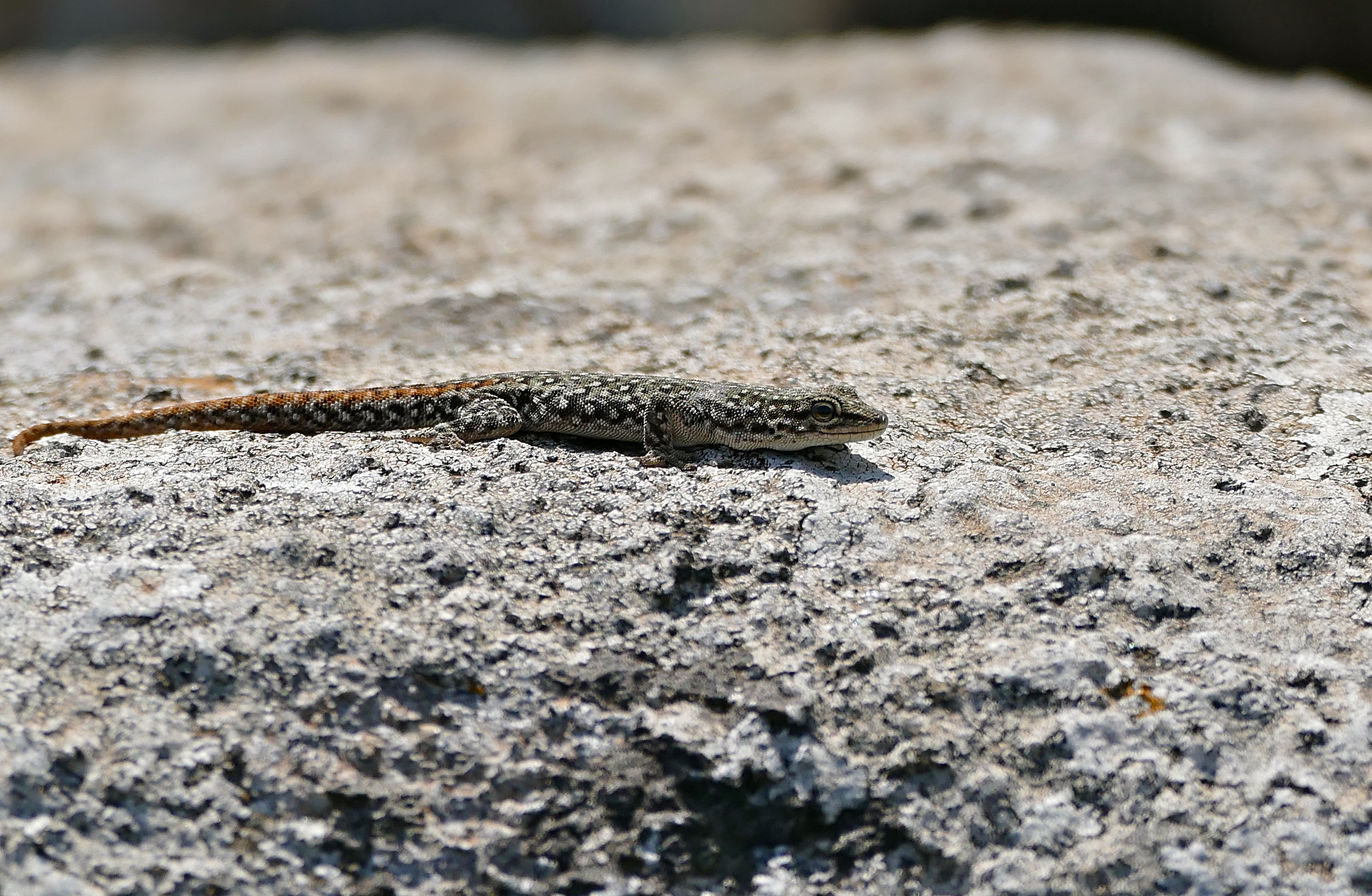

Conservation status
- Least Concern (IUCN 3.1)

Scientific classification
- Kingdom: Animalia
- Phylum: Chordata
- Class: Reptilia
- Order: Squamata
- Suborder: Gekkota
- Family: Gekkonidae
- Genus: Lygodactylus
- Species: L. ocellatus

Binomial name
- Lygodactylus ocellatus Roux, 1907

= Lygodactylus ocellatus =

Species of lizard

Lygodactylus ocellatus , also known as the ocellated dwarf gecko or spotted dwarf gecko, is a species of gecko endemic to South Africa and Eswatini.
