= List of least concern reptiles =

- Extinct in the wild (EW): 2 species
- Critically endangered (CR): 432 species
- Endangered (EN): 800 species
- Vulnerable (VU): 627 species
- Near threatened (NT, LR/cd): 566 species
- Least concern (LC): 6,406 species
- Data deficient (DD): 1,502 species
Reptile species (IUCN, 2025.2)
- 10,368 extant species have been evaluated
- 8,866 of those are fully assessed (Note: excludes data deficient evaluations.)
- 6,972 are not threatened at present
- 1,894 to 3,396 are threatened (Note: Threatened comprises CR, EN and VU. Upper estimate additionally includes DD.)
- 34 to 84 are extinct or extinct in the wild:
  - 32 extinct (EX) species (Note: Chart omits extinct (EX) species)
  - 2 extinct in the wild (EW)
  - 50 possibly extinct [CR(PE)]
  - 0 possibly extinct in the wild [CR(PEW)]

As of September 2016, the International Union for Conservation of Nature (IUCN) lists 2,900 least concern reptile species. 56% of all evaluated reptile species are listed as least concern. The IUCN also lists two reptile subspecies as least concern.

Of the subpopulations of reptiles evaluated by the IUCN, six species subpopulations have been assessed as least concern.

This is a complete list of least concern reptile species and subspecies evaluated by the IUCN. Species and subspecies which have least concern subpopulations (or stocks) are indicated.

== Turtles and tortoises ==
=== Chelidae ===
Austro‑South American side‑necked turtles

- New Guinea snake-necked turtle (Chelodina novaeguineae)
- New Guinea snapping turtle (Elseya novaeguineae)
- Southern New Guinea stream turtle (Elseya rhodini)
- Red-bellied short-necked turtle (Emydura subglobosa)

=== Pelomedusidae ===
African side‑necked turtles

- South African helmeted terrapin (Pelomedusa galeata)
- Yellow-bellied mud turtle (Pelusios castanoides)
- Variable mud turtle (Pelusios rhodesianus)
- East African black mud turtle (Pelusios subniger)

=== Trionychidae ===
Softshell turtles

- Florida softshell turtle (Apalone ferox)
- Smooth softshell turtle (Apalone mutica)
- Spiny softshell turtle (Apalone spinifera)
- Malayan softshell turtle (Dogania subplana)
- Burmese flapshell turtle (Lissemys scutata)

=== Emydidae ===
Terrapins

- Painted turtle (Chrysemys picta)
- Northern map turtle (Graptemys geographica)
- Black-knobbed map turtle (Graptemys nigrinoda)
- Ouachita map turtle (Graptemys ouachitensis)
- False map turtle (Graptemys pseudogeographica)
- Texas map turtle (Graptemys versa)
- River cooter (Pseudemys concinna)
- Florida red-bellied cooter (Pseudemys nelsoni)
- Peninsula cooter (Pseudemys peninsularis)
- Texas river cooter (Pseudemys texana)
- Pond slider (Trachemys scripta)

=== Geoemydidae ===
Box turtles, pond turtles

- Myanmar brown leaf turtle (Cyclemys fusca)
- Khorat snail-eating turtle (Malayemys khoratensis)
- Malayan snail-eating turtle (Malayemys macrocephala)
- Indian black turtle (Melanochelys trijuga)
- Indian tent turtle (Pangshura tentoria)
- Black river turtle (Rhinoclemmys funerea)

=== Testudinidae ===
Tortoises

- Angulate tortoise (Chersina angulata)
- Texas tortoise (Gopherus berlandieri)
- Parrot-beaked tortoise (Homopus areolatus)
- Greater padloper (Homopus femoralis)
- Leopard tortoise (Stigmochelys pardalis)
- Marginated tortoise (Testudo marginata)

=== Cheloniidae ===
Sea turtles

- Green sea turtle (Chelonia mydas)

=== Chelydridae ===
Snapping turtles

- Common snapping turtle (Chelydra serpentina)

=== Kinosternidae ===
Mud turtles, musk turtles

- Jalisco mud turtle (Kinosternon chimalhuaca)
- Creaser's mud turtle (Kinosternon creaseri)
- Yellow mud turtle (Kinosternon flavescens)
- Mexican mud turtle (Kinosternon integrum)
- Oaxaca mud turtle (Kinosternon oaxacae)
- Eastern mud turtle (Kinosternon subrubrum)
- Razor-backed musk turtle (Sternotherus carinatus)
- Loggerhead musk turtle (Sternotherus minor)
- Eastern musk turtle (Sternotherus odoratus)

== Crocodilians ==
- American alligator (Alligator mississippiensis)
- Spectacled caiman (Caiman crocodilus)
- Broad-snouted caiman (Caiman latirostris)
- Yacare caiman (Caiman yacare)
- Freshwater crocodile (Crocodylus johnsoni)
- Morelet's crocodile (Crocodylus moreletii)
- Nile crocodile (Crocodylus niloticus)
- New Guinea crocodile (Crocodylus novaeguineae)
- Saltwater crocodile (Crocodylus porosus)
- Black caiman (Melanosuchus niger)
- Cuvier's dwarf caiman (Paleosuchus palpebrosus)
- Smooth-fronted caiman (Paleosuchus trigonatus)

== Tuatara ==
- Tuatara (Sphenodon punctatus)

== Lizards ==
There are 1657 species and one subspecies of lizard assessed as least concern.

=== Flap-footed lizards ===
- Shark bay worm-lizard
- Mallee worm-lizard
- Pink-tailed worm-lizard
- Flinders Range worm-lizard
- Pretty worm-lizard
- Sedgelands worm-lizard
- Zutydorp worm-lizard
- Striated worm-lizard
- Marble-faced delma
- Rusty-dopped delma
- Butler’s legless lizard
- Javelin lizard
- Desert delma
- Pilbara delma
- Fraser's delma (Delma fraseri)
- Gray’s legless lizard
- Heath delma
- Olive legless lizard
- Striped-tailed delma (Delma labialis)
- Atherton delma
- Adelaide delma
- Sharp-snouted delma
- Peace delma
- Painted delma
- Leaden delma
- Excitable delma
- Collared delma (Delma torquata)
- Burton’s legless lizard (Lialis burtonis)
- New Guinea snake-lizard (Lialis jicari)
- Bronzeback snake-lizard
- Brigalow scaly-foot
- Slender slider
- Common scaly-foot
- Hooded scaly-foot
- Robert’s scaly-foot
- Eastern hooded scaly-foot
- Northern hooded scaly-foot

=== Anguids ===
Includes slowworms, glass lizards, and alligator lizards.

- Abronia gadovii
- Red-lipped arboreal alligator lizard (Abronia lythrochila)
- Abronia monticola
- Morelet's alligator lizard (Abronia moreletii)
- Smith's arboreal alligator lizard (Abronia smithi)
- Abronia viridiflava
- Peloponnese slow worm (Anguis cephalonnica)
- Common slow worm (Anguis fragilis)
- Greek slow worm (Anguis graeca)
- Barisia imbricata
- Buettikofer’s glass lizard (Dopasia buettikoferi)
- Asian glass lizard (Dopasia gracilis)
- Hainan glass lizard (Dopasia hainanensis)
- Hart’s glass lizard (Dopasia harti)
- Ludovic’s glass lizard (Dopasia ludovici)
- Sokolov’s glass lizard (Dopasia sokolovi)
- Wegner's glass lizard (Dopasia wegneri)
- Elgaria cedrosensis
- Northern alligator lizard (Elgaria coerulea)
- Madrean alligator lizard (Elgaria kingii)
- Southern alligator lizard (Elgaria multicarinata)
- Los Coronados alligator lizard (Elgaria nana)
- Elgaria paucicarinata
- Elgaria velazquezi
- Texas alligator lizard (Gerrhonotus infernalis)
- Gerrhonotus liocephalus
- Gerrhonotus lugoi
- Gerrhonotus ophiurus
- Koelliker's glass lizard (Hyalosaurus koellikeri)
- Slender glass lizard (Ophisaurus attenuatus)
- Island glass lizard (Ophisaurus compressus)
- Mimic glass lizard (Ophisaurus mimicus)
- Eastern glass lizard (Ophisaurus ventralis)
- European legless lizard (Pseudopus apodus)

=== Diploglossidae ===
Galliwasps and Ophiodes sp. legless lizards

- Jamaican galliwasp (Celestus crusculus)
- Navassa galliwasp (Comptus badius)
- Cope's galliwasp (Comptus stenurus)
- Cuban galliwasp (Diploglossus delasagra)
- Banded galliwasp (Diploglossus fasciatus)
- Brazilian galliwasp (Diploglossus lessonae)
- Dotted galliwasp (Diploglossus millepunctatus)
- Escorpión coral (Diploglossus monotropis)
- Cuban spotted galliwasp (Diploglossus nigropunctatus)
- Puerto Rican galliwasp (Diploglossus pleii)
- O'Shaughnessy's galliwasp (Mesoamericus bilobatus)
- Fragile worm lizard (Ophiodes fragilis)
- Ophiodes intermedius
- Striped worm lizard (Ophiodes striatus)
- Jointed worm lizard (Ophiodes vertebralis)
- Panolopus costatus
- Marcano's galliwasp (Panolopus marcanoi)
- Hispaniolan khaki galliwasp (Panolopus curtissi)
- Hispaniolan four-toed galliwasp (Sauresia sepsoides)
- Blue-green galliwasp (Siderolamprus cyanochloris)
- Huaxteca lesser galliwasp (Siderolamprus enneagrammus)
- Campbell's galliwasp (Siderolamprus legnotus)
- Rozella's lesser galliwasp (Siderolamprus rozellae)

=== Diplodactylids ===
- Western stone gecko
- Ornate stone gecko
- Rough gecko
- Gargoyle gecko
- New Caledonia giant gecko
- Northern spiny-tailed gecko
- Southern phasmid gecko
- Robust striped gecko
- Golden spiny-tailed gecko

=== Girdled lizards ===
- Lang's crag lizard (Cordylus langi)
- Lawrence's girdled lizard (Cordylus lawrenci)
- Ethiopian girdled lizard (Cordylus rivae)
- Spiny crag lizard (Cordylus spinosus)
- Common flat lizard (Platysaurus intermedius)
- Pungwe flat lizard (Platysaurus pungweensis)
- Collared flat lizard (Platysaurus torquatus)

=== Chameleons ===
- Transvaal dwarf chameleon
- Eastern cape dwarf chameleon
- Brygoo's leaf chameleon
- Plated leaf chameleon
- Brown leaf chameleon
- Perinet leaf chameleon
- Brookesia thieli
- Calumma boettgeri
- Short-horned chameleon
- Cryptic chameleon
- Perinet chameleon
- Calumma guillaumeti
- Calumma linotum
- Calumma malthe
- Nose-horned chameleon
- African chameleon
- Anchieta's chameleon
- Arabian chameleon
- Spurless basilisk chameleon
- Veiled chameleon
- Common chameleon
- Flap-necked chameleon
- Graceful chameleon
- Smooth chameleon
- Namaqua chameleon
- Senegal chameleon
- Indian chameleon
- Angel's chameleon
- Furcifer bifidus
- Furcifer cephalolepis
- Carpet chameleon
- Furcifer major
- Malagasy giant chameleon
- Panther chameleon
- Mayotte chameleon
- Warty chameleon
- Furcifer viridis
- Canopy chameleon
- Ituri chameleon
- Uluguru two-horned chameleon
- Uthmöller's chameleon
- Poroto single-horned chameleon
- Boulenger's pygmy chameleon
- Mount Gorongosa pygmy chameleon
- Udzungwa pygmy chameleon
- Nchisi pygmy chameleon
- Spectral pygmy chameleon
- Uluguru pygmy chameleon
- Zomba pygmy chameleon
- Bearded pygmy chameleon (Rieppeleon brevicaudatus)
- Pygmy grass chameleon (Rieppeleon kerstenii)
- Beardless Ethiopian montane chameleon (Trioceros affinis)
- Side-striped chameleon (Trioceros bitaeniatus)
- Cameroon dwarf chameleon (Trioceros camerunensis)
- Chapin's chameleon (Trioceros chapini)
- Sudanese unicorn chameleon (Trioceros conirostratus)
- Crested chameleon (Trioceros cristatus)
- Usambara three-horned chameleon (Trioceros deremensis)
- Elliot's groove-throated chameleon (Trioceros ellioti)
- Poroto three-horned chameleon (Trioceros fuelleborni)
- Goetze's whistling chameleon (Trioceros goetzei)
- Harenna hornless chameleon (Trioceros harennae)
- Kenyan high-casqued chameleon (Trioceros hoehnelii)
- Ukinga hornless chameleon (Trioceros incornutus)
- Ituri forest chameleon (Trioceros ituriensis)
- Jackson's chameleon (Trioceros jacksonii)
- Johnston's three-horned chameleon (Trioceros johnstoni)
- Meller's giant one-horned chameleon (Trioceros melleri)
- Trioceros nyirit
- Owen's three-horned chameleon
- Rough chameleon
- Tanzanian montane dwarf chameleon
- Udzungwa double-bearded chameleon
- Wemer's three-horned chameleon

=== Plated lizards ===
- Blue-black plated sand lizard (Cordylosaurus subtessellatus)
- Desert plated lizard (Gerrhosaurus skoogi)
- Namaqua plated lizard (Gerrhosaurus typicus)
- African long-tailed seps (Tetradactylus africanus)
- Tracheloptychus madagascariensis
- Bronze girdled lizard (Zonosaurus aeneus)
- Zonosaurus bemaraha
- Zonosaurus brygooi
- Karsten's girdled lizard (Zonosaurus karsteni)
- Western girdled lizard (Zonosaurus laticaudatus)
- Madagascar girdled lizard (Zonosaurus madagascariensis)
- Ornate girdled lizard (Zonosaurus ornatus)
- Zonosaurus trilineatus
- Zonosaurus tsingy

=== Carphodactylids ===
- Common knob-tailed lizard (Nephrurus levis)
- Southern knob-tailed gecko (Nephrurus stellatus)
- Banded knob-tail (Nephrurus wheeleri)
- Phyllurus ossa
- Northern leaf-tailed gecko (Saltuarius cornutus)
- Pernatty knob-tailed gecko (Nephrurus deleani)

=== Anoles ===
- Anolis adleri
- Bueycito anole (Anolis allogus)
- High anole (Anolis altae)
- Chiapas ornate anole(Anolis anisolepis)
- Statia bank tree anole (Anolis bimaculatus)
- Carolina anole (Anolis carolinensis)
- Carpenter's anole (Anolis carpenteri)
- Central anole (Anolis centralis)
- Hill anole (Anolis clivicola)
- Anolis compressicauda
- Anolis cuprinus
- Anolis dunni
- Good anole (Anolis eulaemus)
- Veronica's anole (Anolis festae)
- Fitch's anole (Anolis fitchi)
- Anolis fortunensis
- Fraser's anole (Anolis fraseri)
- Anolis gadovi
- O'Shaughnessy's anole (Anolis gemmosus)
- Graham's anole (Anolis grahami)
- Granular anole (Anolis granuliceps)
- Jacare anole (Anolis jacare)
- Striped anole (Anolis lineatus)
- Anolis liogaster
- Anolis lionotus
- Navassa anole
- Lvnch's anole (Anolis lynchi)
- Anolis macrinii
- Ruida's anole (Anolis megalopithecus)
- Anolis megapholidotus
- Anolis microlepidotus
- Anolis nebuloides
- Anolis nebulosus
- Redonda anole (Anolis nubilis)
- Dwarf anole (Anolis occultus)
- Dominican anole (Anolis oculatus)
- Olsson's anole (Anolis olssoni)
- Anolis omiltemanus
- Thick anole (Anolis pachypus)
- Anolis parvicirculatus
- Crab Cay anole (Anolis pinchoti)
- Anolis quercorum
- Anolis rodriguezii
- Anolis schmidti
- Half-lined Hispaniolan grass anole (Anolis semilineatus)
- Taylor’s anole (Anolis taylori)
- Jamaican twig anole (Anolis valencienni)
- Speckled anole (Anolis ventrimaculatus)
- Pallid stout anole (Anolis whitemani)

=== Gekkonids ===
- Hawequa flat gecko (Afroedura hawequensis)
- Drakensberg flat gecko (Afroedura nivaria)
- Persian spider gecko (Agamura persica)
- Seychelles bronze gecko (Ailuronyx seychellensis)
- Even-fingered gecko (Alsophylax pipiens)
- Xinjiang even-fingered gecko (Alsophylax przewalskii)
- Leviton's gecko (Altiphylax levitoni)
- Frontier bow-fingered gecko (Altiphylax stoliczkai)
- Kirghizia even-fingered gecko (Altiphylax tokobajevi)
- Blaesodactylus antongilensis
- Blaesodactylus sakalava
- Spacious rock gecko (Bunopus spatalurus)
- Baiuch rock gecko (Bunopus tuberculatus)
- Indian golden gecko (Calodactylodes aureus)
- Common giant ground gecko (Chondrodactylus angulifer)
- African gecko (Cnemaspis africana)
- Argus rock gecko (Cnemaspis argus)
- Graceful day gecko (Cnemaspis gracilis)
- Kandyan day gecko (Cnemaspis kandiana)
- Koehler's gecko (Cnemaspis koehleri)
- Cnemaspis limi
- Mysore day gecko (Cnemaspis mysoriensis)
- Deraniyagala's gecko (Cnemaspis podihuna)
- Yercaud day gecko (Cnemaspis yercaudensis)
- Peringuey's leaf-toed gecko (Cryptactites peringueyi)
- Agusan bent-toed gecko (Cyrtodactylus agusanensis)
- Cyrtodactylus annandalei
- Annulated bow-fingered gecko (Cyrtodactylus annulatus)
- Guadalcanal bow-fingered gecko (Cyrtodactylus biordinis)
- Cyrtodactylus boreoclivus
- Cyrtodactylus capreoloides
- Cyrtodactylus epiroticus
- Cyrtodactylus klugei
- Ring-tailed gecko (Cyrtodactylus louisiadensis)
- Clouded Indian gecko (Cyrtodactylus nebulosus)
- Cyrtodactylus novaeguineae
- Philippine bent-toed gecko (Cyrtodactylus philippinicus)
- Cyrtodactylus robustus
- De Rooij's bow-fingered gecko (Cyrtodactylus sermowaiensis)
- Cyrtodactylus serratus
- Sumontha's gecko (Cyrtodactylus sumonthai)
- Cyrtodactylus tripartitus
- Wetar bow-fingered gecko (Cyrtodactylus wetariensis)
- Cyrtodactylus zugi
- Nikolsky's spider gecko (Cyrtopodion agamuroides)
- Blanford's short-toed gecko (Cyrtopodion brevipes)
- Fort Munro sandstone gecko (Cyrtopodion fortmunroi)
- Kerman bent-toed gecko (Cyrtopodion kirmanense)
- Sulaiman range gecko (Cyrtopodion kohsulaimanai)
- Potwar gecko (Cyrtopodion potoharense)
- Rough bent-toed gecko (Cyrtopodion scabrum)
- Cyrtopodion sistanense
- Black-spotted leaf-toed gecko (Dixonius melanostictus)
- Vietnamese leaf-toed gecko (Dixonius vietnamensis)
- Madagascar clawless gecko (Ebenavia inunguis)
- Tete thick-toed gecko (Elasmodactylus tetensis)
- Warty thick-toed gecko (Elasmodactylus tuberculosus)
- Boulenger's Indian gecko (Geckoella albofasciatus)
- Forest spotted gecko (Geckoella collegalensis)
- Gunther's Indian gecko (Geckoella deccanensis)
- Fish-scale gecko (Geckolepis maculata)
- Grandidier's gecko (Geckolepis typica)
- Top-end Dtella (Gehyra australis)
- Borroloola Dtella (Gehyra borroloola)
- Palau Island Dtella (Gehyra brevipalmata)
- Dubious dtella (Gehyra dubia)
- Port Moresby dtella (Gehyra membranacruralis)
- Common four-clawed gecko (Gehyra mutilata)
- Oceania gecko (Gehyra oceanica)
- Pilbara dtella (Gehyra pilbara)
- Gray's Chinese gecko (Gekko chinensis)
- Hokou gecko (Gekko hokouensis)
- Horsfield's flying gecko (Gekko horsfieldii)
- Botel gecko (Gekko kikuchii)
- Mindoro narrow-disked gecko (Gekko mindorensis)
- Palawan narrow-disked gecko (Gekko palawanensis)
- Batan narrow-disked gecko (Gekko porosus)
- Romblon narrow-disked gecko (Gekko romblon)
- Yunnan gecko (Gekko scabridus)
- Large forest gecko (Gekko smithii)
- Tawa gecko (Gekko tawaensis)
- Essex's pygmy gecko (Goggia essexi)
- Richtersveld pygmy gecko (Goggia gemmula)
- Cederberg pygmy gecko (Goggia hexapora)
- Hemidactylus aaronbaueri
- Hemidactylus beninensis
- Kandyan gecko (Hemidactylus depressus)
- Socotra leaf-toed gecko (Hemidactylus forbesii)
- Hemidactylus foudaii
- Common house gecko (Hemidactylus frenatus)
- Giant gecko (Hemidactylus giganteus)
- Graceful leaf-toed gecko (Hemidactylus gracilis)
- Hemidactylus graniticolus
- Hemidactylus homoeolepis
- Carrot-tail viper gecko (Hemidactylus imbricatus)
- Socotran rock gecko (Hemidactylus inintellectus)
- Spotted leaf-toed gecko (Hemidactylus maculatus)
- Togo leaf-toed gecko (Hemidactylus matschiei)
- Hemidactylus mercatorius
- Mount Sinai gecko (Hemidactylus mindiae)
- Sharpnose leaf-toed gecko (Hemidactylus oxyrhinus)
- Antilles leaf-toed gecko (Hemidactylus palaichthus)
- Bombay leaf-toed gecko (Hemidactylus prashadi)
- Pygmy leaf-toed gecko (Hemidactylus pumilio)
- Reticulate leaf-toed gecko (Hemidactylus reticulatus)
- Tornier's leaf-toed gecko (Hemidactylus squamulatus)
- Hemidactylus treutleri
- Mediterranean house gecko (Hemidactylus turcicus)
- Hemidactylus yerburyi
- Southern ghats slender gecko (Hemiphyllodactylus aurantiacus)
- Palau slender gecko (Hemiphyllodactylus ganoklonis)
- Wahlberg's velvet gecko (Homopholis walbergii)
- Yellow-lined smooth-scaled gecko (Lepidodactylus aureolineatus)
- Batan scaly-toed gecko (Lepidodactylus balioburius)
- Christian scaly-toed gecko (Lepidodactylus christiani)
- Guppy's gecko (Lepidodactylus guppyi)
- White-lined smooth-scaled gecko (Lepidodactylus herrei)
- Mountain scaly-toed gecko (Lepidodactylus magnus)
- Lepidodactylus moestus
- Oriental scaly-toed gecko (Lepidodactylus orientalis)
- Small broad-tailed smooth-scaled gecko (Lepidodactylus planicaudus)
- Lepidodactylus vanuatuensis
- Byrne's gecko (Lucasium byrnei)
- Luperosaurus kubli
- Pasteur's dwarf gecko (Lygodactylus arnoulti)
- Okavango dwarf gecko (Lygodactylus chobiensis)
- Lygodactylus heterurus
- Parker's dwarf gecko (Lygodactylus keniensis)
- Lygodactylus laterimaculatus
- Mann's dwarf gecko (Lygodactylus manni)
- Lygodactylus miops
- Lygodactylus mombasicus
- Lygodactylus montanus
- Black-spotted dwarf gecko (Lygodactylus nigropunctatus)
- White-headed dwarf gecko (Lygodactylus picturatus)
- Robust dwarf gecko (Lygodactylus pictus)
- Grandidier's dwarf gecko (Lygodactylus tolampyae)
- Lygodactylus tuberosus
- Lygodactylus verticillatus
- Asia minor thin-toed gecko (Mediodactylus heterocercus)
- Kotschy's gecko (Mediodactylus kotschyi)
- Transcaspian bent-toed gecko (Mediodactylus russowii)
- Kopet Dagh bent-toed gecko (Mediodactylus spinicauda)
- Chitral gecko (Mediodactylus walli)
- Low lying gecko (Microgecko depressus)
- Latifi's dwarf gecko (Microgecko latifi)
- Solomons slender-toed gecko (Nactus multicarinatus)
- Pacific slender-toed gecko (Nactus pelagicus)
- Nactus sphaerodactylodes
- Vankampen's gecko (Nactus vankampeni)
- Banded thick-toed gecko (Pachydactylus fasciatus)
- Western cape gecko (Pachydactylus labialis)
- Spotted gecko (Pachydactylus maculatus)
- Van Son's gecko (Pachydactylus vansoni)
- Mocquard's Madagascar ground gecko (Paroedura bastardi)
- Graceful Madagascar ground gecko (Paroedura gracilis)
- Northern Madagascar ground gecko (Paroedura homalorhina)
- Paroedura karstophila
- Ocelot gecko (Paroedura picta)
- Paroedura stumpffi
- Paroedura vahiny
- Atoll giant gecko (Perochirus scutellatus)
- Abbott's day gecko (Phelsuma abbotti)
- Andaman Islands day gecko (Phelsuma andamanense)
- Seychelles small day gecko (Phelsuma astriata)
- Barbour's day gecko (Phelsuma barbouri)
- Blue-tailed day gecko (Phelsuma cepediana)
- Comoros day gecko (Phelsuma comorensis)
- Zanzibar day gecko (Phelsuma dubia)
- Giant Madagascar day gecko (Phelsuma grandis)
- Speckled day gecko (Phelsuma guttata)
- Phelsuma kochi
- Gold dust day gecko (Phelsuma laticauda)
- Lined day gecko (Phelsuma lineata)
- Madagascar day gecko (Phelsuma madagascariensis)
- Phelsuma modesta
- Thick tail gecko (Phelsuma mutabilis)
- Parker's day gecko (Phelsuma parkeri)
- Phelsuma parva
- Phelsuma pusilla
- Peacock day gecko (Phelsuma quadriocellata)
- Phelsuma ravenala
- La Digue day gecko (Phelsuma sundbergi)
- Boettger's day gecko (Phelsuma v-nigra)
- Gulf short-fingered gecko (Pseudoceramodactylus khobarensis)
- Cylindrical-bodied smooth-scaled gecko (Pseudogekko compressicorpus)
- Dark-spotted smooth-scaled gecko (Pseudogekko labialis)
- Green smooth-scaled gecko (Pseudogekko smaragdinus)
- Interdune barking gecko (Ptenopus kochi)
- Burmese flying gecko (Ptychozoon lionotum)
- Misonne's spider gecko (Rhinogecko misonnei)
- Iranian short-fingered gecko (Stenodactylus affinis)
- Arabian short-fingered gecko (Stenodactylus arabicus)
- Middle Eastern short-fingered gecko (Stenodactylus doriae)
- Jordan short-fingered gecko (Stenodactylus grandiceps)
- Beautiful short-fingered gecko (Stenodactylus pulcher)
- Slevin's short-fingered gecko (Stenodactylus slevini)
- Yemen short-fingered gecko (Stenodactylus yemenensis)
- Caspian bent-toed gecko (Tenuidactylus caspius)
- Yangihissar gecko (Tenuidactylus elongatus)
- Natterers gecko (Tropiocolotes nattereri)
- Tropiocolotes scortecci
- Northern sand gecko (Tropiocolotes tripolitanus)
- Seychelles sucker-tailed gecko (Urocotyledon inexpectata)
- Common flat-tail gecko (Uroplatus fimbriatus)
- Lined flat-tail gecko (Uroplatus lineatus)
- Uroplatus phantasticus
- Uroplatus sameiti
- Uroplatus sikorae

=== Wall lizards ===
- Arabian fringe-fingered lizard (Acanthodactylus arabicus)
- Busack's fringe-fingered lizard (Acanthodactylus busacki)
- Spiny-footed lizard (Acanthodactylus erythrurus)
- Giant fringe-toed lizard (Acanthodactylus grandis)
- Haas' fringe-fingered lizard (Acanthodactylus haasi)
- Spotted fringe-fingered lizard (Acanthodactylus maculatus)
- Arnold's fringe-fingered lizard (Acanthodactylus opheodurus)
- Acanthodactylus orientalis
- Robust fringe-fingered lizard (Acanthodactylus robustus)
- Schmidt's fringe-toed lizard (Acanthodactylus schmidti)
- Schreiber's fringe-fingered lizard (Acanthodactylus schreiberi)
- Acanthodactylus taghitensis
- Acanthodactylus tilburyi
- Lebanon fringe-fingered lizard (Acanthodactylus tristrami)
- Yemen fringe-fingered lizard (Acanthodactylus yemenicus)
- Fitzinger's algyroides (Algyroides fitzingeri)
- Blue-throated keeled lizard (Algyroides nigropunctatus)
- Anatolian rock lizard (Anatololacerta anatolica)
- Danford's lizard (Anatololacerta danfordi)
- Anatololacerta oertzeni
- Anatolian lizard (Apathya cappadocica)
- Apathya yassujica
- Southern rock lizard (Australolacerta australis)
- Sparse-scaled forest lizard (Congolacerta vauereselli)
- Sharp-snouted rock lizard (Dalmatolacerta oxycephala)
- Armenian lizard (Darevskia armeniaca)
- Brauner's rock lizard (Darevskia brauneri)
- Caucasian lizard (Darevskia caucasica)
- Green-bellied lizard (Darevskia chlorogaster)
- Dagestan lizard (Darevskia daghestanica)
- Alborz lizard (Darevskia defilippii)
- Georgian lizard (Darevskia parvula)
- River Kura lizard (Darevskia portschinskii)
- Radde's lizard (Darevskia raddei)
- Spiny-tailed lizard (Darevskia rudis)
- Van lizard (Darevskia sapphirina)
- Darevskia saxicola
- Valentin's lizard (Darevskia valentini)
- Pointed-snouted racerunner (Eremias acutirostris)
- Anderson's racerunner (Eremias andersoni)
- Eremias kavirensis
- Lalehzar racerunner (Eremias lalezharica)
- Eremias montanus
- Black-sided racerunner (Eremias nigrolateralis)
- Strauch's racerunner (Eremias strauchi)
- Suphan racerunner (Eremias suphani)
- Atlantic lizard (Gallotia atlantica)
- Boettger's lizard (Gallotia caesaris)
- Tenerife lizard (Gallotia galloti)
- Gran Canaria giant lizard (Gallotia stehlini)
- Caprivi rough-scaled lizard (Ichnotropis grandiceps)
- Zagros mountain lacerta (Iranolacerta zagrosica)
- Sand lizard (Lacerta agilis)
- Western green lizard (Lacerta bilineata)
- Medium lizard (Lacerta media)
- Lacerta pamphylica
- Caspian green lizard (Lacerta strigata)
- Balkan green lizard (Lacerta trilineata)
- European green lizard (Lacerta viridis)
- Latastia cherchii
- Mesalina adramitana
- Mesalina bahaeldini
- Mesalina balfouri
- Blanford's short-nosed desert lizard (Mesalina brevirostris)
- Mesalina kuri
- Pasteur's lizard (Mesalina pasteuri)
- Simon's desert racer (Mesalina simonii)
- Scaled sandveld lizard (Nucras scalaris)
- Omanosaura cyanura
- Omanosaura jayakari
- Beddome's snake-eye (Ophisops beddomei)
- Jerdon's snake-eye (Ophisops jerdonii)
- Ophisops microlepis
- Western snake-eyed lizard (Ophisops occidentalis)
- Dwarf lizard (Parvilacerta parva)
- Kaokoveld sand lizard (Pedioplanis gaerdesi)
- Karoo sand lizard (Pedioplanis laticeps)
- Philochortus neumanni
- Phoenicolacerta cyanisparsa
- Lebanon lizard (Phoenicolacerta laevis)
- Phoenicolacerta troodica
- Bocage's wall lizard (Podarcis bocagei)
- Erhard's wall lizard (Podarcis erhardii)
- Filfola lizard (Podarcis filfolensis)
- Iberian wall lizard (Podarcis hispanicus)
- Dalmatian wall lizard (Podarcis melisellensis)
- Common wall lizard (Podarcis muralis)
- Peloponnese wall lizard (Podarcis peloponnesiacus)
- Italian wall lizard (Podarcis siculus)
- Balkan wall lizard (Podarcis tauricus)
- Tyrrhenian wall lizard (Podarcis tiliguerta)
- Podarcis vaucheri
- Sicilian wall lizard (Podarcis waglerianus)
- Large psammodromus (Psammodromus algirus)
- Spanish Psammodromus (Psammodromus hispanicus)
- Psammodromus jeanneae
- Psammodromus manuelae
- Peters' sand lizard (Pseuderemias striatus)
- Moroccan rock lizard (Scelarcis perspicillata)
- South-east Asian green grass lizard (Takydromus hani)
- Kuhne's grass lizard (Takydromus kuehnei)
- Asian grass lizard (Takydromus sexlineatus)
- Madeiran wall lizard (Teira dugesii)
- North African ocellated lizard (Timon pater)
- Siirt lizard (Timon princeps)
- Timon tangitanus
- Viviparous lizard (Zootoca vivipara)

=== Skinks ===
Species

- Twin-striped skink (Ablepharus bivittatus)
- Ablepharus budaki
- Chernov's skink (Ablepharus chernovi)
- Desert lidless skink (Ablepharus deserti)
- European copper skink (Ablepharus kitaibelii)
- Ablepharus rueppellii
- Slendertail lance skink (Acontias gracilicauda)
- Striped blind legless skink (Acontias kgaladi)
- Lined lance skink (Acontias lineatus)
- Percival's legless skink (Acontias percivali)
- Giant lance skink (Acontias plumbeus)
- San Andres skink (Alinea berengerae)
- Providencia skink (Alinea pergravis)
- Amphiglossus astrolabi
- Amphiglossus crenni
- Boulenger's tree skink (Amphiglossus frontoparietalis)
- Johanna's skink (Amphiglossus johannae)
- Black-striped skink (Amphiglossus macrocercus)
- Spotted skink (Amphiglossus melanurus)
- Gray skink (Amphiglossus ornaticeps)
- Amphiglossus punctatus
- Amphiglossus reticulatus
- Amphiglossus tanysoma
- Tsaratanana skink (Amphiglossus tsaratananensis)
- Androngo trivittatus
- Short-necked worm-skink (Anomalopus brevicollis)
- Speckled worm-skink (Anomalopus gowi)
- Cool skink (Bassiana trilineatus)
- Stub-limbed burrowing skink (Brachymeles bonitae)
- Boulenger's short-legged skink (Brachymeles boulengeri)
- Slender four-fingered burrowing skink (Brachymeles elerae)
- Brachymeles gracilis
- Cotabato worm skink (Brachymeles pathfinderi)
- Two-digit worm skink (Brachymeles samarensis)
- Schadenberg's burrowing skink (Brachymeles schadenbergi)
- Duméril's short-legged skink (Brachymeles talinis)
- Negros three-digit worm skink (Brachymeles tridactylus)
- Speckled litter skink (Caledoniscincus atropunctatus)
- Common litter skink (Caledoniscincus austrocaledonicus)
- Caledoniscincus bodoi
- Giant litter skink (Caledoniscincus festivus)
- Strand litter skink (Caledoniscincus haplorhinus)
- Enigmatic rainbow skink (Carlia aenigma)
- Carlia ailanpalai
- Aramia rainbow skink (Carlia aramia)
- Carlia bicarinata
- Carlia bomberai
- Carlia caesius
- Digul river rainbow skink (Carlia diguliensis)
- Sandy rainbow skink (Carlia dogare)
- Carlia eothen
- Brown four-fingered skink (Carlia fusca)
- Slender rainbow skink (Carlia gracilis)
- Carlia luctuosa
- Mys' rainbow skink (Carlia mysi)
- Carlia pulla
- Northern red-throated skink (Carlia rubrigularis)
- Southern rainbow-skink (Carlia tetradactyla)
- Italian three-toed skink (Chalcides chalcides)
- Riffian skink (Chalcides colosii)
- De l'Isle's wedge-snouted skink (Chalcides delislei)
- Algerian three-toed skink (Chalcides mertensi)
- Mionecton skink (Chalcides mionecton)
- Many-scaled cylindrical skink (Chalcides polylepis)
- Mocquard's cylindrical skink (Chalcides pulchellus)
- Wedge-snouted skink (Chalcides sepsoides)
- Gran Canaria skink (Chalcides sexlineatus)
- Duméril's wedge-snouted skink (Chalcides sphenopsiformis)
- Western three-toed skink (Chalcides striatus)
- Thierry's cylindrical skink (Chalcides thierryi)
- West Canary skink (Chalcides viridanus)
- Delalande's skink (Chioninia delalandii)
- Santo Antão skink (Chioninia fogoensis)
- São Nicolau skink (Chioninia nicolauensis)
- Chioninia spinalis
- Keeled water skink (Cophoscincopus durus)
- Cophoscincopus greeri
- Cophoscincopus simulans
- Cryptoblepharus furvus
- Leschenault snake eyed skink (Cryptoblepharus leschenault)
- New Guinea snake-eyed skink (Cryptoblepharus novaeguineae)
- New Caledonian shore skink (Cryptoblepharus novocaledonicus)
- Oceania snake-eyed skink (Cryptoblepharus poecilopleurus)
- Cryptoblepharus renschi
- Palau snake eyed skink (Cryptoblepharus rutilus)
- Cryptoblepharus yulensis
- Brown-blazed wedgesnout ctenotus (Ctenotus allotropis)
- Plain-backed Kimberley ctenotus (Ctenotus burbidgei)
- Kakadu ctenotus (Ctenotus gagudju)
- Jewelled south-west ctenotus (Ctenotus gemmula)
- Clay-soil ctenotus (Ctenotus helenae)
- Bar-shouldered ctenotus (Ctenotus inornatus)
- Leonhardi's ctenotus (Ctenotus leonhardii)
- Western slender blue-tongue (Cyclodomorphus celatus)
- Olive dasia (Dasia olivacea)
- King's skink (Egernia kingii)
- Yakka skink (Egernia rugosa)
- Bronze skink (Emoia aenea)
- Micronesia black skink (Emoia arnoensis)
- Golden forest skink (Emoia aurulenta)
- Battersby's skink (Emoia battersbyi)
- Emoia baudini
- Emoia bismarckensis
- Bogert's skink (Emoia bogerti)
- Brongersma's forest skink (Emoia brongersmai)
- Pacific bluetail skink (Emoia caeruleocauda)
- Emoia callisticta
- Teal emo skink (Emoia cyanogaster)
- Yellow-throated skink (Emoia flavigularis)
- Allison's skink (Emoia guttata)
- Dark-bellied copper-striped skink (Emoia impar)
- Irian skink (Emoia irianensis)
- Bellona skink (Emoia isolata)
- Papua five-striped skink (Emoia jakati)
- Loveridge's skink (Emoia loveridgei)
- Spotted blue-tailed skink (Emoia maculata)
- Great skink (Emoia maxima)
- Emoia montana
- Black emo skink (Emoia nigra)
- Vanuatu silver vineskink (Emoia nigromarginata)
- Obscure skink (Emoia obscura)
- Emoia oribata
- De Vis' skink (Emoia pallidiceps)
- Slender skink (Emoia physicae)
- Small keel-scaled skink (Emoia physicina)
- Pope's skink (Emoia popei)
- Solomons blue-tailed skink (Emoia pseudocyanura)
- Arboreal skink (Emoia pseudopallidiceps)
- Rennell blue-tailed skink (Emoia rennellensis)
- Red-tailed swamp skink (Emoia ruficauda)
- Sanford's tree skink (Emoia sanfordi)
- Schmidt's skink (Emoia schmidti)
- Madeay's skink (Emoia submetallica)
- Taumako skink (Emoia taumakoensis)
- Four-striped skink (Emoia tetrataenia)
- Polynesia slender treeskink (Emoia tongana)
- Emoia tropidolepis
- Tropical skink (Emoia veracunda)
- Brown-sided bar-lipped skink (Eremiascincus brongersmai)
- Barred shark skink (Eugongylus albofasciolatus)
- Eugongylus unilineatus
- Southern water skink (Eulamprus heatwolei)
- Orange-speckled forest-skink (Eulamprus luteilateralis)
- Stout barsided skink (Eulamprus sokosoma)
- Border Ranges blue-spectacled skink (Eulamprus tryoni)
- Algerian orange-tailed skink (Eumeces algeriensis)
- Schmidt's mabuya (Eutropis allapallensis)
- Eutropis bibronii
- Eutropis bontocensis
- Keeled Indian mabuya (Eutropis carinata)
- Six-striped mabouya (Eutropis englei)
- Anderson's mabuya (Eutropis novemcarinata)
- Three-banded mabuya (Eutropis trivittata)
- Cogger's Island skink (Geomyersia coggeri)
- Cape York mulch-skink (Glaphyromorphus crassicaudus)
- Three-toed earless skink (Hemiergis decresiensis)
- Two-toed earless skink (Hemiergis quadrilineatum)
- Heyer's isopachys (Isopachys anguinoides)
- Gyldenstolpe's worm skink (Isopachys gyldenstolpei)
- Chonburi snake skink (Isopachys roulei)
- Beddome's ground skink (Kaestlea beddomei)
- Two-lined ground skink (Kaestlea bilineata)
- Barbour's ground skink (Kaestlea travancorica)
- Nieuwenhuis' skink (Lamprolepis nieuwenhuisi)
- Single finger larut skink (Larutia miodactyla)
- Larutia sumatrensis
- Uganda five-toed skink (Leptosiaphos aloysiisabaudiae)
- Red five-toed skink (Leptosiaphos rhodurus)
- Cape range slider (Lerista allochira)
- Blinking broad-blazed slider (Lerista connivens)
- Wide-striped mulch slider (Lerista elongata)
- Kennedy range broad-blazed slider (Lerista kennedyensis)
- Onslow broad-blazed slider (Lerista onsloviana)
- Arnhem coast fine-lined slider (Lerista stylis)
- Ribbon lerista (Lerista taeniata)
- Slender duneslider (Lerista vermicularis)
- Coastal Kimberley slider (Lerista walkeri)
- Black mountain skink (Liburnascincus scirtetis)
- Desert egernia (Liopholis inornata)
- Night skink (Liopholis striata)
- White's rock-skink (Liopholis whitii)
- Green-bellied tree skink (Lioscincus nigrofasciolatum)
- Blue-mouthed skink (Lioscincus novaecaledoniae)
- Bronze slender tree skink (Lipinia auriculata)
- Lipinia infralineolata
- Long lipinia (Lipinia longiceps)
- Lipinia nototaenia
- Yellow-striped slender tree skink (Lipinia pulchella)
- Lipinia pulchra
- Roux's lipinia (Lipinia rouxi)
- Lipinia septentrionalis
- Lobulia alpina
- Brongersma's lobulia (Lobulia brongersmai)
- Elegant lobulia (Lobulia elegans)
- Lobulia subalpina
- Lygisaurus curtus
- Lygisaurus novaeguineae
- Eastern cape litter-skink (Lygisaurus sesbrauna)
- Günther's writhing snake (Lygosoma guentheri)
- Banded supple skink (Lygosoma haroldyoungi)
- Korat supple skink (Lygosoma koratense)
- Lined writhing skink (Lygosoma lineata)
- Redtail skink (Madascincus igneocaudatus)
- Common Madagascar skink (Madascincus melanopleura)
- Madascincus minutus
- Morondava skink (Madascincus mouroundavae)
- Madagascar coastal skink (Madascincus polleni)
- Maracaiba meridensis
- Maracaiba zuliae
- Marisora alliacea
- Marisora brachypoda
- Marisora falconensis
- Central American mabuya (Marisora unimarginata)
- Marble-throated skink (Marmorosphax tricolor)
- Longtail limbless skink (Melanoseps ater)
- Shark Bay dwarf skink (Menetia amaura)
- Managua skink (Mesoscincus managuae)
- Mesoscincus schwartzei
- Mochlus brevicaudis
- Guinean forest skink (Mochlus guineensis)
- Mafia writhing skink (Mochlus mafianum)
- Mocquard's writhing skink (Mochlus mocquardi)
- Pemba Island writhing skink (Mochlus pembanum)
- Boulenger's writhing skink (Mochlus productum)
- Sundevall's writhing skink (Mochlus sundevalli)
- Boulenger's snake-eyed skink (Morethia boulengeri)
- Southern skink (Oligosoma notosaurus)
- Suter's skink (Oligosoma suteri)
- Brown skink (Oligosoma zelandicum)
- Plateau snake skink (Ophiomorus nuchalis)
- Persian snake skink (Ophiomorus persicus)
- Limbless skink (Ophiomorus punctatissimus)
- Three-fingered sand-fish (Ophiomorus raithmai)
- Street's snake skink (Ophiomorus streeti)
- Venezuelan mountain skink (Orosaura nebulosylvestris)
- Gardiner's burrowing skink (Pamelaescincus gardineri)
- Cabinda lidless skink (Panaspis cabindae)
- Panaspis helleri
- Nimba snake-eyed skink (Panaspis nimbaensis)
- Togo skink (Panaspis togoensis)
- Carvalho's mabuya (Panopa carvalhoi)
- Papuascincus morokanus
- Papuascincus stanleyanus
- Hildebrand's skink (Paracontias hildebrandti)
- Anzahamaru skink (Paracontias holomelas)
- Garnier's giant skink (Phoboscincus garnieri)
- Coal skink (Plestiodon anthracinus)
- Plestiodon brevirostris
- Plestiodon callicephalus
- Plestiodon copei
- Mole skink (Plestiodon egregius)
- Common five-lined skink (Plestiodon fasciatus)
- Gilbert's skink (Plestiodon gilberti)
- Southeastern five-lined skink (Plestiodon inexpectatus)
- San Lucan skink (Plestiodon lagunensis)
- Broad-headed skink (Plestiodon laticeps)
- Oak forest skink (Plestiodon lynxe)
- Many-lined skink (Plestiodon multivirgatus)
- Great Plains skink (Plestiodon obsoletus)
- Guerreran skink (Plestiodon ochoterenae)
- Prairie skink (Plestiodon septentrionalis)
- Western skink (Plestiodon skiltonianus)
- Sumichrast's skink (Plestiodon sumichrasti)
- Four-lined skink (Plestiodon tetragrammus)
- Common green tree skink (Prasinohaema flavipes)
- Prehensile green tree skink (Prasinohaema prehensicauda)
- Green-blooded skink (Prasinohaema virens)
- Spinifex snake-eyed snake (Proablepharus reginae)
- Bight coast skink (Pseudemoia baudini)
- Southern grass tussock skink (Pseudemoia pagenstecheri)
- Pygomeles braconnieri
- Beddome's cat skink (Ristella beddomii)
- Czechuras litter-skink (Saproscincus czechurai)
- Mozambique dwarf burrowing skink (Scelotes mossambicus)
- Scincella gemmingeri
- Ground skink (Scincella lateralis)
- Scincella silvicola
- Tsushima ground skink (Scincella vandenburghi)
- Scincus hemprichii
- Eastern skink (Scincus mitranus)
- Albert's skink (Sepsina alberti)
- Sphenomorphus abdictus
- Pointed-headed sphenomorphus (Sphenomorphus acutus)
- Spotted forest skink (Sphenomorphus aruensis)
- Sphenomorphus assatus
- Zamboanga sphenomorphus (Sphenomorphus atrigularis)
- Sphenomorphus bignelli
- Sphenomorphus brunneus
- Sphenomorphus cherriei
- Elegant forest skink (Sphenomorphus concinnatus)
- Cox's sphenomorphus (Sphenomorphus coxi)
- Crane's skink (Sphenomorphus cranei)
- Cuming's sphenomorphus (Sphenomorphus cumingi)
- Sphenomorphus cyanolaemus
- Sphenomorphus darlingtoni
- Black-sided sphenomorphus (Sphenomorphus decipiens)
- Sphenomorphus derooyae
- Dussumier's forest skink (Sphenomorphus dussumieri)
- Banded sphenomorphus (Sphenomorphus fasciatus)
- Slender litter skink (Sphenomorphus forbesi)
- Sphenomorphus fragilis
- Sphenomorphus fuscolineatus
- Sphenomorphus granulatus
- Sphenomorphus incertus
- Jagor's sphenomorphus (Sphenomorphus jagori)
- Sphenomorphus jobiensis
- Sphenomorphus kitangladensis
- Sphenomorphus latifasciatus
- Sphenomorphus leptofasciatus
- White-spotted sphenomorphus (Sphenomorphus leucospilos)
- Sphenomorphus longicaudatus
- Sphenomorphus loriae
- Sphenomorphus louisiadensis
- Sphenomorphus maindroni
- Sphenomorphus meyeri
- Sphenomorphus microtympanum
- Sphenomorphus minutus
- Sphenomorphus neuhaussi
- Sphenomorphus nigriventris
- Sphenomorphus nigrolineatus
- Barred burrowing skink (Sphenomorphus pratti)
- Sphenomorphus schultzei
- Palau ground skink (Sphenomorphus scutatus)
- Common forest skink (Sphenomorphus simus)
- Steere's sphenomorphus (Sphenomorphus steerei)
- Tanner's skink (Sphenomorphus tanneri)
- Sphenomorphus tropidonotus
- Wavy-backed forest skink (Sphenomorphus undulatus)
- Centralian blue-tongued skink (Tiliqua multifasciata)
- Blotched blue-tongued skink (Tiliqua nigrolutea)
- Western blue-tongued skink (Tiliqua occipitalis)
- Shingleback skink (Tiliqua rugosa)
- Common blue-tongued skink (Tiliqua scincoides)
- Levant skink (Trachylepis aurata)
- Orange-throated skink (Trachylepis aureogularis)
- Gold-spotted mabuya (Trachylepis aureopunctata)
- Benson's mabuya (Trachylepis bensonii)
- Trachylepis bocagii
- Boettger's mabuya (Trachylepis boettgeri)
- Trachylepis comorensis
- Two-coloured skink (Trachylepis dichroma)
- Elegant mabuya (Trachylepis elegans)
- Gravenhorst's mabuya (Trachylepis gravenhorstii)
- Bronze rock skink (Trachylepis lacertiformis)
- Malagasy mabuya (Trachylepis madagascariensis)
- Trachylepis margaritifera
- Trachylepis paucisquamis
- Montane speckled skink (Trachylepis punctatissima)
- Seychelles skink (Trachylepis seychellensis)
- Socotra mabuya (Trachylepis socotrana)
- Trachylepis tandrefana
- Trachylepis tessellata
- Boulder mabuya (Trachylepis vato)
- Bridled mabuya (Trachylepis vittata)
- Blanchard's helmet skink (Tribolonotus blanchardi)
- Tribolonotus gracilis
- Spiny skink (Tribolonotus novaeguineae)
- Western crocodile skink (Tribolonotus pseudoponceleti)
- Schmidt's crocodile skink (Tribolonotus schmidti)
- Davao waterside skink (Tropidophorus davaoensis)
- Spiny waterside skink (Tropidophorus grayi)
- Laotian keeled skink (Tropidophorus laotus)
- Misamis waterside skink (Tropidophorus misaminius)
- Tropidophorus mocquardi
- Partello's waterside skink (Tropidophorus partelloi)
- Northern whiptailed skink (Tropidoscincus boreus)
- Southern whiptailed skink (Tropidoscincus variabilis)
- Cuvier's legless skink (Typhlosaurus caecus)
- Two-striped mabuya (Varzea bistriata)
- Voeltzkowia fierinensis
- Voeltzkowia lineata
- Voeltzkowia rubrocaudata

Subspecies

- Egernia stokesii stokesii
- Eastern blue-tongued lizard (Tiliqua scincoides scincoides)

=== Hoplocercin species ===
- Enyalioides azulae
- Cofan woodlizard (Enyalioides cofanorum)
- Bocourt's dwarf iguana (Enyalioides heterolepis)
- Small-scaled woodlizard (Enyalioides microlepis)
- Blue-spotted wood lizard (Enyalioides praestabilis)
- Enyalioides rudolfarndti
- Cenepa manticores (Morunasaurus peruvianus)

=== Collared lizards ===
- Great Basin collared lizard (Crotaphytus bicinctores)
- Common collared lizard (Crotaphytus collaris)
- Tiburon collared lizard (Crotaphytus dickersonae)
- Grimser's collared lizard (Crotaphytus grismeri)
- Crotaphytus insularis
- Sonoran collared lizard (Crotaphytus nebrius)
- Baja California collared lizard (Crotaphytus vestigium)
- Baja California leopard lizard (Gambelia copeii)
- Long-nosed leopard lizard (Gambelia wislizenii)

=== Spectacled lizards ===
- Adercosaurus vixadenexus
- Northern teiid (Alopoglossus angulatus)
- Buckley's teiid (Alopoglossus buckleyi)
- Alopoglossus copii
- Alopoglossus festae
- Four-toed amapasaurus (Amapasaurus tetradactylus)
- Two-banded anadia (Anadia bitaeniata)
- Anadia escalerae
- Spotted anadia (Anadia marmorata)
- Anadia mcdiarmidi
- Ocellated anadia (Anadia ocellata)
- Steyer's anadia (Anadia steyeri)
- Boulenger's anadia (Anadia vittata)
- Arthrosaura guianensis
- Arthrosaura hoogmoedi
- Arthrosaura kockii
- Arthrosaura montigena
- Donneisy's arthrosaura (Arthrosaura synaptolepis)
- Arthrosaura testigensis
- Arthrosaura tyleri
- Arthrosaura versteegii
- Bachia flavescens
- Bachia panoplia
- Ruthven's bachia (Bachia talpa)
- Stacy's bachia (Bachia trisanale)
- Elegant eyed lizard (Cercosaura argulus)
- Cercosaura nigroventris
- Cercosaura phelpsorum
- Schreibers' many-fingered teiid (Cercosaura schreibersii)
- Rough teiid (Echinosaura horrida)
- Echinosaura panamensis
- Sharp-snouted sun tegu (Euspondylus acutirostris)
- Euspondylus auyanensis
- Günther's sun tegu (Euspondylus guentheri)
- Cryptic spectacled tegu (Gymnophthalmus cryptus)
- Gymnophthalmus lineatus
- Underwood's spectacled tegu (Gymnophthalmus underwoodi)
- Gymnophthalmus vanzoi
- Six-scaled tegu (Leposoma hexalepis)
- Leposoma parietale
- Muller's tegu (Leposoma percarinatum)
- Leposoma rugiceps
- Northern spectacled lizard (Leposoma southi)
- Ruthven's macropholidus (Macropholidus ruthveni)
- Medem's neusricurus (Neusticurus medemi)
- Tate's neusticurus (Neusticurus tatei)
- Shreve's lightbulb lizard (Oreosaurus shrevei)
- Macbryde's pholidobolus (Pholidobolus macbrydei)
- Montanucci's pholidobolus (Pholidobolus prefrontalis)
- Placosoma cordylinum
- Uzzell's neusticurus (Potamites apodemus)
- Cochran's neusticurus (Potamites cochranae)
- Bolivian lightbulb lizard (Proctoporus bolivianus)
- Proctoporus chasqui
- Proctoporus kiziriani
- Proctoporus sucullucu
- Proctoporus unsaacae
- River teiid (Proctoporus xestus)
- Werner's largescale lizard (Ptychoglossus bicolor)
- Peracca's largescale lizard (Ptychoglossus festae)
- Kugler's largescale lizard (Ptychoglossus kugleri)
- Ptychoglossus myersi
- Taylor's largescale lizard (Ptychoglossus plicatus)
- Ptychoglossus stenolepis
- Ptychoglossus vallensis
- Riama achlyens
- Lightbulb lizard (Riama luctuosa)
- Striped lightbulb lizard (Riama striata)
- Riolama luridiventris
- Riolama uzzelli

=== Sphaerodactylids ===
- Saint George Island gecko (Aristelliger georgeensis)
- Ilha Maracá gecko (Coleodactylus septentrionalis)
- European leaf-toed gecko (Euleptes europaea)
- Gonatodes alexandermendesi
- Shieldhead gecko (Gonatodes caudiscutatus)
- Brilliant South American gecko (Gonatodes ceciliae)
- O'shaughnessy's gecko (Gonatodes concinnatus)
- Estado falcon gecko (Gonatodes falconensis)
- Haseman's gecko (Gonatodes hasemani)
- Peters' gecko (Gonatodes petersi)
- Gonatodes riveroi
- Gonatodes rozei
- Sarisariñama forest gecko (Gonatodes superciliaris)
- Estado Aragua gecko (Gonatodes taniae)
- Gonatodes timidus
- Lepidoblepharis duolepis
- Lepidoblepharis intermedius
- Paraguanan ground gecko (Lepidoblepharis montecanoensis)
- Lepidoblepharis peraccae
- Lepidoblepharis ruthveni
- Lepidoblepharis sanctaemartae
- Lepidoblepharis xanthostigma
- Abdel Kuri rock gecko (Pristurus abdelkuri)
- Carter's semaphore gecko (Pristurus carteri)
- Pristurus celerrimus
- Pristurus collaris
- Guichard's rock gecko (Pristurus guichardi)
- Blanford's rock gecko (Pristurus insignis)
- Haggier Massif rock gecko (Pristurus insignoides)
- Pristurus minimus
- Pristurus obsti
- Birdhead rock gecko (Pristurus ornithocephalus)
- Pristurus popovi
- Iranian rock gecko (Pristurus rupestris)
- Yemen rock gecko (Pristurus saada)
- Pristurus samhaensis
- Pristurus schneideri
- Socotra rock gecko (Pristurus sokotranus)
- Venezuela clawed gecko (Pseudogonatodes lunulatus)
- Pseudogonatodes manessi
- Quedenfeldtia moerens
- Morocco lizard-fingered gecko (Saurodactylus brosseti)
- Saurodactylus mauritanicus
- Central Bahamas sphaero (Sphaerodactylus corticola)
- Hispaniolan eyespot sphaero (Sphaerodactylus difficilis)
- Dunn's least gecko (Sphaerodactylus dunni)
- Sphaerodactylus glaucus
- Costa Rica least gecko (Sphaerodactylus graptolaemus)
- Caribbean least gecko (Sphaerodactylus homolepis)
- Puerto Rican upland sphaero (Sphaerodactylus klauberi)
- Panama least gecko (Sphaerodactylus lineolatus)
- Sphaerodactylus millepunctatus
- Tobago least gecko (Sphaerodactylus molei)
- Mona least gecko (Sphaerodactylus monensis)
- Puerto Rican crescent sphaero (Sphaerodactylus nicholsi)
- Reef gecko (Sphaerodactylus notatus)
- Pacific least gecko (Sphaerodactylus pacificus)
- Bay Island least gecko (Sphaerodactylus rosaurae)
- Altagracia speckled sphaero (Sphaerodactylus savagei)
- Double-collared sphaero (Sphaerodactylus scaber)
- Hispaniolan small-eared sphaero (Sphaerodactylus streptophorus)
- Vincent's least gecko (Sphaerodactylus vincenti)
- Przewalski's wonder gecko (Teratoscincus przewalskii)

=== Night lizards ===
- Yellow-spotted tropical night lizard (Lepidophyma flavimaculatum)
- Japlan tropical night lizard (Lepidophyma occulor)
- Pajapan tropical night lizard (Lepidophyma pajapanensis)
- Costa Rican tropical night lizard (Lepidophyma reticulatum)
- Smith's tropical night lizard (Lepidophyma smithii)
- Madrean tropical night lizard (Lepidophyma sylvaticum)
- Arizona night lizard (Xantusia arizonae)
- Bezy's night lizard (Xantusia bezyi)
- Durango night lizard (Xantusia extorris)
- Granite night lizard (Xantusia henshawi)
- Island night lizard (Xantusia riversiana)
- Xantusia sanchezi
- Desert night lizard (Xantusia vigilis)

=== Teiids ===
Includes whiptails and tegus.

- Giant ameiva (Ameiva atrigularis)
- Common ameiva (Ameiva chrysolaema)
- Ameiva concolor
- Pigmy blue-tailed ameiva (Ameiva lineolata)
- Ameivula abalosi
- Aspidoscelis angusticeps
- Aspidoscelis bacatus
- Canyon spotted whiptail (Aspidoscelis burti)
- Aspidoscelis calidipes
- Aspidoscelis canus
- Carmen Island whiptail (Aspidoscelis carmenensis)
- Aspidoscelis celeripes
- Aspidoscelis ceralbensis
- Aspidoscelis communis
- Aspidoscelis costatus
- Aspidoscelis cozumela
- Aspidoscelis danheimae
- Blackbelly racerunner (Aspidoscelis deppei)
- Aspidoscelis espiritensis
- Chihuahuan spotted whiptail (Aspidoscelis exsanguis)
- Gila spotted whiptail (Aspidoscelis flagellicauda)
- Aspidoscelis franciscensis
- Texas spotted whiptail (Aspidoscelis gularis)
- Aspidoscelis guttata
- Orange-throated whiptail (Aspidoscelis hyperythra)
- Little striped whiptail (Aspidoscelis inornata)
- Laredo striped whiptail (Aspidoscelis laredoensis)
- Aspidoscelis lineattissima
- Aspidoscelis maslini
- Aspidoscelis mexicana
- Aspidoscelis motaguae
- New Mexico whiptail (Aspidoscelis neomexicana)
- Pai striped whiptail (Aspidoscelis pai)
- Aspidoscelis parvisocia
- Aspidoscelis pictus
- Aspidoscelis sacki
- Plateau spotted whiptail (Aspidoscelis septemvittata)
- Six-lined racerunner (Aspidoscelis sexlineata)
- Sonoran spotted whiptail (Aspidoscelis sonorae)
- Common checkered whiptail (Aspidoscelis tesselata)
- Western whiptail (Aspidoscelis tigris)
- Desert grassland whiptail lizard (Aspidoscelis uniparens)
- Plateau striped whiptail (Aspidoscelis velox)
- Longtail whiptail (Aurivela longicauda)
- Aurivela tergolaevigata
- Spotted false monitor (Callopistes maculatus)
- Cnemidophorus arenivagus
- Cnemidophorus gramivagus
- Cnemidophorus nigricolor
- Coles' racerunner (Cnemidophorus pseudolemniscatus)
- Cnemidophorus senectus
- Contomastix serrana
- Crocodile tegu (Crocodilurus amazonicus)
- Ecuador desert tegu (Dicrodon heterolepis)
- Echternacht's ameiva (Holcosus anomalus)
- Middle American ameiva (Holcosus festivus)
- Delicate ameiva (Holcosus leptophrys)
- Holcosus niceforoi
- Four-lined ameiva (Holcosus quadrilineatus)
- Seven-lined ameiva (Holcosus septemlineatus)
- Rainbow ameiva (Holcosus undulatus)
- Guyana Kentropyx (Kentropyx borckiana)
- Kentropyx lagartija
- Green kentropyx (Kentropyx viridistriga)
- Bocourt's ameiva (Medopheos edracantha)
- Inagua ameiva (Pholidoscelis maynardii)
- Argentine black and white tegu (Salvator merianae)
- Teius suquiensis
- Four-toed tegu (Teius teyou)

=== Worm lizards ===
- Red worm lizard (Amphisbaena alba)
- Amphisbaena albocingulata
- South American worm lizard (Amphisbaena angustifrons)
- Amphisbaena bolivica
- Amphisbaena borelli
- Crooked worm lizard (Amphisbaena camura)
- Amphisbaena cegei
- Slender worm lizard (Amphisbaena gracilis)
- Amphisbaena heterozonata
- Western worm lizard (Amphisbaena occidentalis)
- Lead worm lizard (Amphisbaena plumbea)
- Bahia worm lizard (Amphisbaena polystegum)
- Rio Grande worm lizard (Amphisbaena pretrei)
- Ridley's worm lizard (Amphisbaena ridleyi)
- Amphisbaena schmidti
- Slevin's worm lizard (Amphisbaena slevini)
- Amphisbaena tragorrhectes
- Iberian worm lizard (Blanus cinereus)
- Moroccan worm lizard (Blanus mettetali)
- Turkish worm lizard (Blanus strauchi)
- Blanus tingitanus
- French Congo worm lizard (Cynisca bifrontalis)
- Ugly worm lizard (Cynisca feae)
- Liberia worm lizard (Cynisca liberiensis)
- Liwale round-snouted worm lizard (Loveridgea ionidesii)
- Inirida worm lizard (Mesobaena huebneri)
- Angolan spade-snouted worm lizard (Monopeltis anchietae)
- Western Congo worm lizard (Monopeltis guentheri)
- Gaboon worm lizard (Monopeltis jugularis)
- Zygaspis kafuensis
- Zygaspis nigra

=== Neotropical ground lizards ===
- Rodrigues' lava lizard (Eurolophosaurus nanuzae)
- Northern curly-tailed lizard (Leiocephalus carinatus)
- Hispaniolan curlytail lizard (Leiocephalus schreibersii)
- Galapagos lava lizard (Microlophus albemarlensis)
- Atacamen Pacific iguana (Microlophus atacamensis)
- Microlophus habelii
- Microlophus indefatigabilis
- Microlophus jacobi
- Microlophus koepckeorum
- Knobbed Pacific iguana (Microlophus occipitalis)
- Common Pacific iguana (Microlophus pacificus)
- Peru Pacific iguana (Microlophus peruvianus)
- Microlophus stolzmanni
- Theresia's Pacific iguana (Microlophus theresiae)
- Microlophus theresioides
- Tschudi's Pacific iguana (Microlophus thoracicus)
- Tiger Pacific iguana (Microlophus tigris)
- Microlophus yanezi
- Plica lumaria
- Plica pansticta
- Stenocercus aculeatus
- Boettger's whorltail iguana (Stenocercus boettgeri)
- Golden whorltail iguana (Stenocercus chrysopygus)
- Spiny whorltail iguana (Stenocercus crassicaudatus)
- Copper whorltail iguana (Stenocercus cupreus)
- Stenocercus erythrogaster
- Western leaf lizard (Stenocercus fimbriatus)
- Stenocercus frittsi
- Stenocercus imitator
- Stenocercus iridiscens
- Stenocercus lache
- Stenocercus latebrosus
- Stenocercus marmoratus
- Ochoa whorltail iguana (Stenocercus ochoai)
- Eastern whorltail iguana (Stenocercus orientalis)
- Stenocercus pectinatus
- Stenocercus percultus
- Stenocercus prionotus
- Stenocercus puyango
- Stenocercus santander
- Stenocercus scapularis
- Duméril's whorltail iguana (Stenocercus trachycephalus)
- Keeled lava lizard (Tropidurus bogerti)
- Tropidurus chromatops
- Striped lava lizard (Tropidurus semitaeniatus)
- Spiny lava lizard (Tropidurus spinulosus)
- Amazon lava lizard (Tropidurus torquatus)

=== Eublepharids ===
- Texas banded gecko (Coleonyx brevis)
- Yucatan banded gecko (Coleonyx elegans)
- Black banded gecko (Coleonyx fasciatus)
- Coleonyx gypsicolus
- Central American banded gecko (Coleonyx mitratus)
- Reticulate banded gecko (Coleonyx reticulatus)
- Switak's banded gecko (Coleonyx switaki)
- Western banded gecko (Coleonyx variegatus)
- Western Indian leopard gecko (Eublepharis fuscus)
- Eastern Indian leopard gecko (Eublepharis hardwickii)
- Turkmenistan eyelid gecko (Eublepharis turcmenicus)
- African fat-tailed gecko (Hemitheconyx caudicinctus)

=== Dragon lizards ===
- Anderson's rock agama (Acanthocercus adramitanus)
- Eritrean rock agama (Acanthocercus annectens)
- Black-necked agama (Acanthocercus atricollis)
- Black-necked tree agama (Acanthocercus cyanogaster)
- Acanthocercus yemensis
- Brown pricklenape (Acanthosaura lepidogaster)
- Agama africana
- Agama boensis
- Bouet's agama (Agama boueti)
- Boulenger's agama (Agama boulengeri)
- Elmenteita rock agama (Agama caudospinosa)
- Agama cristata
- Agama dodomae
- Common spiny agama (Agama hispida)
- Bibron's agama (Agama impalearis)
- Agama insularis
- Agama kaimosae
- Mwanza flat-headed rock agama (Agama mwanzae)
- Agama parafricana
- Spiny agama (Agama spinosa)
- Agama tassiliensis
- Agama turuensis
- Gambia agama (Agama weidholzi)
- Mallee heath lashtail (Amphibolurus norrisi)
- Dusky earless agama (Aphaniotis fusca)
- Hardwicke's bloodsucker (Brachysaura minor)
- Great crested canopy lizard (Bronchocela jubata)
- Marbled crested lizard (Bronchocela marmorata)
- Gunther's bloodsucker (Bronchocela smaragdina)
- Calotes chincollium
- Elliot's forest lizard (Calotes ellioti)
- Large-scaled forest lizard (Calotes grandisquamis)
- Medog bloodsucker (Calotes medogensis)
- Hardwicke's bloodsucker (Calotes minor)
- Nilgiri forest lizard (Calotes nemoricola)
- Roux's forest calotes (Calotes rouxii)
- Frilled lizard (Chlamydosaurus kingii)
- Lake Eyre dragon (Ctenophorus maculosus)
- Central netted dragon (Ctenophorus nuchalis)
- Ornate crevice-dragon (Ctenophorus ornatus)
- Ochre dragon (Ctenophorus tjantjalka)
- White-lipped two-line dragon (Diporiphora albilabris)
- Lally's two-line dragon (Diporiphora lalliae)
- Pink two-line dragon (Diporiphora linga)
- Two-spotted flying lizard (Draco bimaculatus)
- Draco cornutus
- Draco cyanopterus
- Southern flying lizard (Draco dussumieri)
- Draco guentheri
- Red-barbed flying dragon (Draco haematopogon)
- Draco jareckii
- Lined flying dragon (Draco lineatus)
- Asian gliding lizard (Draco maculatus)
- White spotted flying lizard (Draco ornatus)
- Quadras' flying lizard (Draco quadrasi)
- Draco reticulatus
- Barred flying dragon (Draco taeniopterus)
- Abbott's crested lizard (Gonocephalus abbotti)
- Doria’s angle-headed lizard (Gonocephalus doriae)
- Giant forest dragon (Gonocephalus grandis)
- Gonocephalus interruptus
- Manthey's forest dragon (Gonocephalus lacunosus)
- Mindoro forest dragon (Gonocephalus semperi)
- Negros forest dragon (Gonocephalus sophiae)
- Ambon sailfin dragon (Hydrosaurus amboinensis)
- Philippine sailfin lizard (Hydrosaurus pustulatus)
- Hypsilurus auritus
- Two-marked forest dragon (Hypsilurus binotatus)
- Hypsilurus capreolatus
- Crowned forest dragon (Hypsilurus dilophus)
- New Guinea forest dragon (Hypsilurus geelvinkianus)
- Hypsilurus hikidanus
- Hypsilurus longi
- Hypsilurus magnus
- Modest forest dragon (Hypsilurus modestus)
- Papua forest dragon (Hypsilurus papuensis)
- Vogt's forest dragon (Hypsilurus schoedei)
- Hypsilurus schultzewestrumi
- Banded japalure (Japalura fasciata)
- Japalura flaviceps
- Cloud-forest japalure (Japalura tricarinata)
- Variegated mountain lizard (Japalura variegata)
- Gilbert's dragon (Lophognathus gilberti)
- Redbelly agama (Paralaudakia erythrogaster)
- Turkestan rock agama (Paralaudakia lehmanni)
- Small-scaled rock agama (Paralaudakia microlepis)
- Arabian toad-headed agama (Phrynocephalus arabicus)
- Phrynocephalus axillaris
- Sunwatcher (Phrynocephalus helioscopus)
- Yellow-speckled toad agama (Phrynocephalus luteoguttatus)
- Saissan toad-headed agama (Phrynocephalus melanurus)
- Striped toad agama (Phrynocephalus ornatus)
- Przewalski's toadhead agama (Phrynocephalus przewalskii)
- Theobald's toad-headed agama (Phrynocephalus theobaldi)
- Phrynocephalus versicolor
- Phrynocephalus vlangalii
- Eastern bearded dragon (Pogona barbata)
- Blanford's rock agama (Psammophilus blanfordanus)
- Peninsular rock agama (Psammophilus dorsalis)
- Vietnam false bloodsucker (Pseudocalotes brevipes)
- Dring's false bloodsucker (Pseudocalotes dringi)
- Mountain dragon (Rankinia diemensis)
- Iraqi mastigure (Saara loricata)
- Anaimalai spiny lizard (Salea anamallayana)
- Horsfield's spiny lizard (Salea horsfieldii)
- Fan throated lizard (Sitana ponticeriana)
- Starred agama (Stellagama stellio)
- Trapelus agnetae
- Trapelus boehmei
- Yellow-spotted agama (Trapelus flavimaculatus)
- Trapelus lessonae
- Horny-scaled agama (Trapelus ruderatus)
- Erg agama (Trapelus tournevillei)
- Houston's earless dragon (Tympanocryptis houstoni)
- Yemeni spiny-tailed lizard (Uromastyx benti)
- Eyed dabb lizard (Uromastyx ocellata)
- Ornate mastigure (Uromastyx ornata)

=== Phyllodactylids ===
- Asaccus caudivolvulus
- Asaccus elisae
- Gallagher's gecko (Asaccus gallagheri)
- Gray-spotted leaf-toed gecko (Asaccus griseonotus)
- Kermanshah leaf-toed gecko (Asaccus kermanshahensis)
- Asaccus kurdistanensis
- Asaccus nasrullahi
- Asaccus platyrhynchus
- Haemodracon riebeckii
- Pygmy Socotran leaf-toed gecko (Haemodracon trachyrhinus)
- Cei's marked gecko (Homonota andicola)
- Borelli's marked gecko (Homonota borellii)
- Darwin's marked gecko (Homonota darwinii)
- South American marked gecko (Homonota fasciata)
- Chilean marked gecko (Homonota gaudichaudii)
- Homonota underwoodi
- Barrington leaf-toed gecko (Phyllodactylus barringtonensis)
- Phyllodactylus bordai
- Phyllodactylus bugastrolepis
- Phyllodactylus davisi
- Phyllodactylus delcampoi
- Dixon's leaf-toed gecko (Phyllodactylus dixoni)
- Phyllodactylus duellmani
- South American leaf-toed gecko (Phyllodactylus gerrhopygus)
- Phyllodactylus homolepidurus
- Peru leaf-toed gecko (Phyllodactylus inaequalis)
- Andes leaf-toed gecko (Phyllodactylus interandinus)
- Coastal leaf-toed gecko (Phyllodactylus kofordi)
- Phyllodactylus lanei
- Central leaf-toed gecko (Phyllodactylus microphyllus)
- Phyllodactylus muralis
- Phyllodactylus partidus
- Peters' leaf-toed gecko (Phyllodactylus reissii)
- Colombian leaf-toed gecko (Phyllodactylus transversalis)
- Phyllodactylus tuberculosus
- Margarita leaf-toed gecko (Phyllodactylus ventralis)
- Xantus leaf-toed gecko (Phyllodactylus xanti)
- Oudri's fan-footed gecko (Ptyodactylus oudrii)
- American wall gecko (Tarentola americana)
- East Canary gecko (Tarentola angustimentalis)
- Bocage's wall gecko (Tarentola bocagei)
- Böhme's gecko (Tarentola boehmei)
- Boettger's wall gecko (Tarentola boettgeri)
- Santo Antão wall gecko (Tarentola caboverdiana)
- Darwin's wall gecko (Tarentola darwini)
- Tenerife gecko (Tarentola delalandii)
- Desert wall gecko (Tarentola deserti)
- Fogo wall gecko (Tarentola fogoensis)
- Gomero wall gecko (Tarentola gomerensis)
- Maio wall gecko (Tarentola maioensis)
- Common wall gecko (Tarentola mauritanica)
- Qattara gecko (Tarentola mindiae)
- Algerian wall gecko (Tarentola neglecta)
- São Nicolau wall gecko (Tarentola nicolauensis)
- Tarentola pastoria
- Tarentola protogigas
- Tarentola senegambiae
- São Vicente wall gecko (Tarentola substituta)

=== Phrynosomatids ===
- Zebra-tailed lizard (Callisaurus draconoides)
- Greater earless lizard (Cophosaurus texanus)
- Elegant earless lizard (Holbrookia elegans)
- Lesser earless lizard (Holbrookia maculata)
- Keeled earless lizard (Holbrookia propinqua)
- Banded rock lizard (Petrosaurus mearnsi)
- Petrosaurus repens
- Petrosaurus slevini
- Baja blue rock lizard (Petrosaurus thalassinus)
- Giant horned lizard (Phrynosoma asio)
- Short-tailed horned lizard (Phrynosoma braconnieri)
- Texas horned lizard (Phrynosoma cornutum)
- Coast horned lizard (Phrynosoma coronatum)
- Pygmy short-horned lizard (Phrynosoma douglasii)
- Greater short-horned lizard (Phrynosoma hernandesi)
- Roundtail horned lizard (Phrynosoma modestum)
- Mexican Plateau horned lizard (Phrynosoma orbiculare)
- Desert horned lizard (Phrynosoma platyrhinos)
- Regal horned lizard (Phrynosoma solare)
- Mexican horned lizard (Phrynosoma taurus)
- Sceloporus acanthinus
- Sceloporus adleri
- Sceloporus aeneus
- Sceloporus anahuacus
- Sceloporus angustus
- Sceloporus asper
- Sceloporus bicanthalis
- Sceloporus bulleri
- Sceloporus carinatus
- Sceloporus cautus
- Sceloporus chrysostictus
- Clark's spiny lizard (Sceloporus clarkii)
- Sceloporus couchi
- Sceloporus cozumelae
- Sceloporus cryptus
- Sceloporus dugesii
- Sceloporus edwardtaylori
- Sceloporus formosus
- Sceloporus gadoviae
- Sagebrush lizard (Sceloporus graciosus)
- Graphic spiny lizard (Sceloporus grammicus)
- Sceloporus grandaevus
- Sceloporus heterolepis
- Sceloporus horridus
- Sceloporus hunsakeri
- Sceloporus insignis
- Sceloporus internasalis
- Sceloporus jalapae
- Mountain spiny lizard (Sceloporus jarrovi)
- Sceloporus licki
- Sceloporus lineatulus
- Luna's spiny lizard (Sceloporus lunae)
- Lundell's spiny lizard (Sceloporus lundelli)
- Sceloporus macdougalli
- Desert spiny lizard (Sceloporus magister)
- Green spiny lizard (Sceloporus malachiticus)
- Sceloporus melanorhinus
- Canyon lizard (Sceloporus merriami)
- Sceloporus minor
- Sceloporus mucronatus
- Sceloporus nelsoni
- Western fence lizard (Sceloporus occidentalis)
- Sceloporus ochoterenae
- Texas spiny lizard (Sceloporus olivaceus)
- Granite spiny lizard (Sceloporus orcutti)
- Sceloporus palaciosi
- Sceloporus parvus
- Crevice spiny lizard (Sceloporus poinsettii)
- Chiapan rough-scaled lizard (Sceloporus prezygus)
- Sceloporus pyrocephalus
- Sceloporus samcolemani
- Sceloporus scalaris
- Blue spiny lizard (Sceloporus serrifer)
- Sceloporus siniferus
- Slevin's bunchgrass lizard (Sceloporus slevini)
- Sceloporus smaragdinus
- Sceloporus smithi
- Sceloporus spinosus
- Sceloporus squamosus
- Sceloporus stejnegeri
- Sceloporus sugillatus
- Sceloporus taeniocnemis
- Sceloporus teapensis
- Sceloporus torquatus
- Eastern fence lizard (Sceloporus undulatus)
- Sceloporus utiformis
- Sceloporus vandenburgianus
- Rose-bellied lizard (Sceloporus variabilis)
- Striped plateau lizard (Sceloporus virgatus)
- Sceloporus zosteromus
- Mojave fringe-toed lizard (Uma scoparia)
- Urosaurus bicarinatus
- Urosaurus gadovi
- Long-tailed brush lizard (Urosaurus graciosus)
- Urosaurus lahtelai
- Baja California brush lizard (Urosaurus nigricaudus)
- Ornate tree lizard (Urosaurus ornatus)
- Uta nolascensis
- Uta squamata
- Common side-blotched lizard (Uta stansburiana)

=== Varanids ===
- Bengal monitor (Varanus bengalensis)
- Bogert's monitor (Varanus bogerti)
- Yellow-headed water monitor (Varanus cumingi)
- Blue-tailed monitor (Varanus doreanus)
- Savannah monitor (Varanus exanthematicus)
- Finsch's monitor (Varanus finschi)
- Yellow monitor (Varanus flavescens)
- Kimberley rock monitor (Varanus glauerti)
- Mangrove monitor (Varanus indicus)
- Peach-throated monitor (Varanus jobiensis)
- Rennell Island monitor (Varanus juxtindicus)
- Marbled water monitor (Varanus marmoratus)
- Large-scaled water monitor (Varanus nuchalis)
- Emerald tree monitor (Varanus prasinus)
- Northern blunt-spined monitor (Varanus primordius)
- Rosenberg's monitor (Varanus rosenbergi)
- Crocodile monitor (Varanus salvadorii)
- Asian water monitor (Varanus salvator)
- Banded tree monitor (Varanus scalaris)
- Isabel monitor (Varanus spinulosus)

=== Liolaemids ===
- Liolaemus abaucan
- Liolaemus abdalai
- Liolaemus acostai
- Liolaemus albiceps
- Andes tree iguana (Liolaemus andinus)
- Liolaemus annectens
- Liolaemus anomalus
- Liolaemus antumalguen
- Main tree iguana (Liolaemus archeforus)
- Liolaemus atacamensis
- Austromendocino tree iguana (Liolaemus austromendocinus)
- Liolaemus avilai
- Liolaemus baguali
- Liolaemus bellii
- Bibron's tree iguana (Liolaemus bibronii)
- Striped tree iguana (Liolaemus bitaeniatus)
- Boulenger's tree iguana (Liolaemus boulengeri)
- Buerger's tree iguana (Liolaemus buergeri)
- Liolaemus calchaqui
- Liolaemus camarones
- Liolaemus canqueli
- Liolaemus caparensis
- Hulse's tree iguana (Liolaemus capillitas)
- Liolaemus casamiquelai
- Liolaemus cazianiae
- Cei's tree iguana (Liolaemus ceii)
- Liolaemus chacabucoense
- Chaco tree iguana (Liolaemus chacoensis)
- Liolaemus chaltin
- Chilean tree iguana (Liolaemus chiliensis)
- Liolaemus chillanensis
- Liolaemus chlorostictus
- Liolaemus choique
- Liolaemus chungara
- Blue tree iguana (Liolaemus coeruleus)
- Constanze's tree iguana (Liolaemus constanzae)
- Liolaemus crepuscularis
- Liolaemus cristiani
- Curicen tree iguana (Liolaemus curicensis)
- Liolaemus cuyanus
- Cyan tree iguana (Liolaemus cyanogaster)
- Darwin's tree iguana (Liolaemus darwinii)
- Liolaemus diaguita
- Donoso-barros' tree iguana (Liolaemus donosobarrosi)
- Dorbigny's tree iguana (Liolaemus dorbignyi)
- Liolaemus dumerili
- Eleodor's tree iguana (Liolaemus eleodori)
- Liolaemus escarchadosi
- Liolaemus espinozai
- Liolaemus etheridgei
- Fitzgerald's tree iguana (Liolaemus fitzgeraldi)
- Fitzinger's tree iguana (Liolaemus fitzingerii)
- Liolaemus flavipiceus
- Fox's lizard (Liolaemus foxi)
- Liolaemus fuscus
- Liolaemus gallardoi
- Liolaemus goetschi
- Liolaemus gracielae
- Graceful tree iguana (Liolaemus gracilis)
- Liolaemus grosseorum
- Hajek's lizard (Liolaemus hajeki)
- Liolaemus hatcheri
- Liolaemus heliodermis
- Liolaemus huacahuasicus
- Liolaemus huayra
- Liolaemus inacayali
- Liolaemus incaicus
- Liolaemus inti
- Liolaemus irregularis
- James' tree iguana (Liolaemus jamesi)
- Liolaemus josei
- Liolaemus juanortizi
- King's tree iguana (Liolaemus kingii)
- Liolaemus kolengh
- Krieg's tree iguana (Liolaemus kriegi)
- Liolaemus laurenti
- Liolaemus lavillai
- Liolaemus lemniscatus
- Decorated tree iguana (Liolaemus lineomaculatus)
- Liolaemus lopezi
- Magellan's tree iguana (Liolaemus magellanicus)
- Liolaemus maldonadae
- Liolaemus mapuche
- Liolaemus melaniceps
- Liolaemus melanogaster
- Liolaemus millcayac
- Liolaemus molinai
- Mountain tree iguana (Liolaemus montanus)
- Liolaemus monticola
- Liolaemus morandae
- Many-colored tree iguana (Liolaemus multicolor)
- Liolaemus nigrocoeruleus
- Liolaemus nigromaculatus
- Black-green tree iguana (Liolaemus nigroviridis)
- Shining tree iguana (Liolaemus nitidus)
- Liolaemus olongasta
- Liolaemus orientalis
- Liolaemus orko
- Ornate tree iguana (Liolaemus ornatus)
- Ortiz's tree iguana (Liolaemus ortizii)
- Liolaemus pacha
- Liolaemus pachacutec
- Liolaemus pagaburoi
- Liolaemus parvus
- Liolaemus petrophilus
- Liolaemus pictus
- Liolaemus pipanaco
- Braided tree iguana (Liolaemus platei)
- Liolaemus pleopholis
- Liolaemus poecilochromus
- Liolaemus polystictus
- Liolaemus pseudoanomalus
- Liolaemus pseudolemniscatus
- Liolaemus puelche
- Liolaemus pulcherrimus
- Liolaemus puna
- Liolaemus punmahuida
- Liolaemus puritamensis
- Liolaemus purul
- Liolaemus pyriphlogos
- Liolaemus ramirezae
- Liolaemus ramonensis
- Liolaemus riojanus
- Robert's tree iguana (Liolaemus robertmertensi)
- Roth's sand iguana (Liolaemus rothi)
- Ruibal's tree iguana (Liolaemus ruibali)
- Liolaemus sagei
- San Juan tree iguana (Liolaemus sanjuanensis)
- Liolaemus sarmientoi
- Liolaemus saxatilis
- Schröder's tree iguana (Liolaemus schroederi)
- Liolaemus scrocchii
- Liolaemus senguer
- Liolaemus septentrionalis
- Liolaemus shehuen
- Liolaemus shitan
- Zodiac tree iguana (Liolaemus signifer)
- Liolaemus silvanae
- Liolaemus sitesi
- Liolaemus smaug
- Liolaemus somuncurae
- Stolzmann's Pacific iguana (Liolaemus stolzmanni)
- Liolaemus talampaya
- Liolaemus tari
- Liolaemus tehuelche
- Liolaemus telsen
- Thin tree iguana (Liolaemus tenuis)
- Liolaemus thomasi
- Liolaemus tristis
- Liolaemus tromen
- Liolaemus tulkas
- Liolaemus umbrifer
- Liolaemus uptoni
- Macola's tree iguana (Liolaemus uspallatensis)
- Liolaemus vallecurensis
- Liolaemus vulcanus
- Liolaemus wari
- Liolaemus wiegmannii
- Liolaemus williamsi
- Liolaemus xanthoviridis
- Liolaemus yanalcu
- Liolaemus yatel
- Zapallaren tree iguana (Liolaemus zapallarensis)
- Liolaemus zullyae
- Phymaturus aguanegra
- Phymaturus antofagastensis
- Phymaturus calcogaster
- Camila's Patagonian rocky lizard (Phymaturus camilae)
- Phymaturus castillensis
- Phymaturus ceii
- Phymaturus delheyi
- Phymaturus denotatus
- Phymaturus excelsus
- Phymaturus extrilidus
- Phymaturus felixi
- Phymaturus laurenti
- Phymaturus maulense
- Phymaturus nevadoi
- High mountain lizard (Phymaturus palluma)
- Cei's mountain lizard (Phymaturus punae)
- Phymaturus querque
- Phymaturus roigorum
- Phymaturus sinervoi
- Phymaturus sitesi
- Phymaturus somuncurensis
- Phymaturus spectabilis
- Phymaturus spurcus
- Phymaturus williamsi
- Phymaturus yachanana
- Phymaturus zapalensis

=== Leiosaurids ===
- Boulenger's tree lizard (Anisolepis grilli)
- Bibron's iguana (Diplolaemus bibronii)
- Darwin's iguana (Diplolaemus darwinii)
- Leopard iguana (Diplolaemus leopardinus)
- Diplolaemus sexcinctus
- Enyalius bibronii
- Enyalius pictus
- Bell's anole (Leiosaurus bellii)
- Leiosaurus catamarcensis
- Leiosaurus juguaris
- Pristidactylus nigroiugulus
- Burmeister's anole (Pristidactylus scapulatus)
- Pristidactylus torquatus

=== Corytophanids ===
- Common basilisk (Basiliscus basiliscus)
- Plumed basilisk (Basiliscus plumifrons)
- Brown basilisk (Basiliscus vittatus)
- Helmeted iguana (Corytophanes cristatus)
- Corytophanes hernandesii
- Guatemalan helmeted basilisk (Corytophanes percarinatus)
- Eastern casquehead iguana (Laemanctus longipes)
- Laemanctus serratus

=== Madagascan iguanas ===
- Chalarodon madagascariensis
- Cuvier's Madagascar swift (Oplurus cuvieri)
- Merrem's Madagascar swift (Oplurus cyclurus)
- Oplurus fierinensis
- Oplurus grandidieri
- Duméril's Madagascar swift (Oplurus quadrimaculatus)
- Oplurus saxicola

=== Other lizard species ===
- Anelytropsis papillosus
- Black legless lizard (Anniella pulchra)
- Mexican mole lizard (Bipes biporus)
- Bipes canaliculatus
- Bipes tridactylus
- Ctenosaura acanthura
- Ctenosaura hemilopha
- Ctenosaura macrolopha
- Ctenosaura pectinata
- Common spiny-tailed iguana (Ctenosaura similis)
- Bourret's blind skink (Dibamus bourreti)
- New Guinea blind earless skink (Dibamus novaeguineae)
- Zarudnyi's worm lizard (Diplometopon zarudnyi)
- Desert iguana (Dipsosaurus dorsalis)
- Beaded lizard (Heloderma horridum)
- Green iguana (Iguana iguana)
- Werner's bush anole (Polychrus femoralis)
- Florida worm lizard (Rhineura floridana)
- Common chuckwalla (Sauromalus ater)
- Checkerboard worm lizard (Trogonophis wiegmanni)
- Xenosaurus penai
- Xenosaurus rectocollaris

== Snakes ==
There are 1192 snake species assessed as least concern.

=== Pseudoxyrhophiids ===
- Alluaudina bellyi
- Boulenger's forest snake (Compsophis boulengeri)
- Lined forest snake (Compsophis infralineata)
- Compsophis laphystius
- Günther's racer (Ditypophis vivax)
- Dromicodryas bernieri
- Dromicodryas quadrilineatus
- Common slug eater (Duberria lutrix)
- Variegated slug-eater (Duberria variegata)
- Exallodontophis albignaci
- Heteroliodon occipitalis
- Forest night snake (Ithycyphus goudoti)
- Tiny night snake (Ithycyphus miniatus)
- Ithycyphus oursi
- Ithycyphus perineti
- Langaha alluaudi
- Langaha madagascariensis
- Langaha pseudoalluaudi
- Leioheterodon geayi
- Malagasy giant hognose snake (Leioheterodon madagascariensis)
- Blonde hognose snake (Leioheterodon modestus)
- Liophidium chabaudi
- Gold-collared snake (Liophidium rhodogaster)
- Liophidium torquatum
- Liophidium vaillanti
- Liopholidophis dolicocercus
- Liopholidophis rhadinaea
- Six-lined water snake (Liopholidophis sexlineatus)
- Liopholidophis varius
- Lycodryas gaimardi
- Lycodryas granuliceps
- Lycodryas pseudogranuliceps
- Madagascar night snake (Madagascarophis colubrinus)
- Madagascarophis meridionalis
- Madagascarophis ocellatus
- Micropisthodon ochraceus
- Banded Philippine burrowing snake (Oxyrhabdium leporinum)
- Non-banded Philippine burrowing snake (Oxyrhabdium modestum)
- Parastenophis betsileanus
- Phisalixella arctifasciata
- Phisalixella tulearensis
- Night brook snake (Pseudoxyrhopus heterurus)
- Pseudoxyrhopus microps
- Striped brook snake (Pseudoxyrhopus quinquelineatus)
- Pseudoxyrhopus tritaeniatus
- Thamnosophis epistibes
- Thamnosophis infrasignatus
- Lateral water snake (Thamnosophis lateralis)

=== Typhlopid blind snakes ===
- Bismarck sharp-nosed blind snake (Acutotyphlops subocularis)
- Liwale blind-snake (Afrotyphlops tanganicanus)
- Costa Rica worm snake (Amerotyphlops costaricensis)
- Yucatecan worm snake (Amerotyphlops microstomus)
- Reticulate worm snake (Amerotyphlops reticulatus)
- Coffee worm snake (Amerotyphlops tenuis)
- Interior blind snake (Austrotyphlops endoterus)
- Pale-headed blind snake (Austrotyphlops hamatus)
- Kimberley shallow-soil blind snake (Austrotyphlops kimberleyensis)
- Austrotyphlops pilbarensis
- Proximus blind snake (Austrotyphlops proximus)
- Austrotyphlops waitii
- Beaked worm snake (Grypotyphlops acutus)
- Brahminy blind snake (Indotyphlops braminus)
- Cross' beaked snake (Letheobia crossii)
- St. Thomas' beaked snake (Letheobia feae)
- Lake Tanganyika blind snake (Letheobia graueri)
- Zanzibar gracile blind-snake (Letheobia lumbriciformis)
- Léopoldville beaked snake (Letheobia praeocularis)
- Letheobia simonii
- Stejneger's beaked snake (Letheobia stejnegeri)
- Swahili gracile blind-snake (Letheobia swahilica)
- Palau Island blind snake (Ramphotyphlops acuticaudus)
- White-headed blind snake (Ramphotyphlops albiceps)
- Ramphotyphlops bicolor
- Melanesia blindsnake (Ramphotyphlops depressus)
- Northern New Guinea blindsnake (Ramphotyphlops erycinus)
- Yellowbellied blindsnake (Ramphotyphlops flaviventer)
- Lined blind snake (Ramphotyphlops lineatus)
- Hook-nosed blindsnake (Ramphotyphlops multilineatus)
- Sand worm snake (Typhlops arenarius)
- Typhlops boettgeri
- Typhlops caecatus
- Brown-backed blind snake (Typhlops castonotus)
- Typhlops decorsei
- Diard's blindsnake (Typhlops diardii)
- Puerto Rican coastal blindsnake (Typhlops hypomethes)
- Jamaican blindsnake (Typhlops jamaicensis)
- Luzon blind snake (Typhlops luzonensis)
- Müller's blind snake (Typhlops muelleri)
- South India worm snake (Typhlops pammeces)
- Samar blind snake (Typhlops ruber)
- Island worm snake (Typhlops sulcatus)

=== Boids ===
- Dumeril's boa (Acrantophis dumerili)
- Malagasy ground boa (Acrantophis madagascariensis)
- Fiji Island boa (Candoia bibroni)
- Palau bevel-nosed boa (Candoia superciliosa)
- Rubber boa (Charina bottae)
- Puerto Rican boa (Chilabothrus inornatus)
- Arabian sand boa (Eryx jayakari)
- Bolivian anaconda (Eunectes beniensis)
- Dark spotted anaconda (Eunectes deschauenseei)
- Green anaconda (Eunectes murinus)
- Yellow anaconda (Eunectes notaeus)
- Rosy boa (Lichanura trivirgata)
- Madagascar tree boa (Sanzinia madagascariensis)

=== Vipers ===
- Northern copperhead (Agkistrodon contortrix)
- Cottonmouth (Agkistrodon piscivorus)
- Taylor's cantil (Agkistrodon taylori)
- Green bush viper (Atheris chlorechis)
- Atropoides mexicanus
- Jumping pit viper (Atropoides nummifer)
- Atropoides occiduus
- Olmecan pit viper (Atropoides olmec)
- Picado's pit viper (Atropoides picadoi)
- Fea's viper (Azemiops feae)
- Berg adder (Bitis atropos)
- Dwarf puff adder (Bitis peringueyi)
- Rhinoceros viper (Bitis rhinoceros)
- Guatemala palm pit viper (Bothriechis bicolor)
- Coffee palm viper (Bothriechis lateralis)
- Chocoan toadheaded pitviper (Bothrocophias myersi)
- Caatinga lancehead (Bothrops erythromelas)
- Sao Paulo lancehead (Bothrops itapetiningae)
- Jararacussu (Bothrops jararacussu)
- Cerrado lancehead (Bothrops lutzi)
- Inca forest pit viper (Bothrops oligolepis)
- Malayan pit viper (Calloselasma rhodostoma)
- Arabian horned viper (Cerastes gasperettii)
- Sahara sand viper (Cerastes vipera)
- Godman's montane pit viper (Cerrophidion godmani)
- Tzotzil montane pit viper (Cerrophidion tzotzilorum)
- Eastern diamondback rattlesnake (Crotalus adamanteus)
- Crotalus angelensis
- Queretaran dusky rattlesnake (Crotalus aquilus)
- Western diamondback rattlesnake (Crotalus atrox)
- Crotalus basiliscus
- Crotalus caliginis
- Sidewinder (Crotalus cerastes)
- Cascabel rattlesnake (Crotalus durissus)
- Crotalus enyo
- Crotalus estebanensis
- Timber rattlesnake (Crotalus horridus)
- Crotalus intermedius
- Rock rattlesnake (Crotalus lepidus)
- Crotalus lorenzoensis
- Speckled rattlesnake (Crotalus mitchellii)
- Black-tailed rattlesnake (Crotalus molossus)
- Crotalus muertensis
- Western rattlesnake (Crotalus oreganus)
- Crotalus polystictus
- Twin-spotted rattlesnake (Crotalus pricei)
- Crotalus ravus
- Red diamond rattlesnake (Crotalus ruber)
- Mohave rattlesnake (Crotalus scutulatus)
- Middle American rattlesnake (Crotalus simus)
- Tiger rattlesnake (Crotalus tigris)
- Tortuga Island rattlesnake (Crotalus tortugensis)
- Crotalus transversus
- Crotalus triseriatus
- Yucatan neotropical rattlesnake (Crotalus tzabcan)
- Prairie rattlesnake (Crotalus viridis)
- New Mexican ridge-nosed rattlesnake (Crotalus willardi)
- White-lipped pitviper (Cryptelytrops albolabris)
- Cardamom Mountains green pitviper (Cryptelytrops cardamomensis)
- Naga-hill pit viper (Cryptelytrops erythrurus)
- Sunda Island pitviper (Cryptelytrops insularis)
- Large-eyed pit viper (Cryptelytrops macrops)
- Mangrove pit viper (Cryptelytrops purpureomaculatus)
- Palestine viper (Daboia palaestinae)
- Eastern Russell's viper (Daboia siamensis)
- Echis borkini
- Echis khosatzkii
- White-bellied carpet viper (Echis leucogaster)
- Oman saw-scaled viper (Echis omanensis)
- Egyptian saw-scaled viper (Echis pyramidum)
- Mount Kinabalu pit viper (Garthius chaseni)
- Rock mamushi (Gloydius saxatilis)
- Tibetan pit viper (Himalayophis tibetanus)
- Sri Lanka humpnose viper (Hypnale nepa)
- Mount Bulgar viper (Montivipera bulgardaghica)
- Ottoman viper (Montivipera xanthina)
- Malayan brown pit viper (Ovophis convictus)
- Taiwan mountain pitviper (Ovophis makazayazaya)
- Chinese mountain pit viper (Ovophis monticola)
- Tonkin pit viper (Ovophis tonkinensis)
- Zayuan mountain pit viper (Ovophis zayuensis)
- Hagen's green pit viper (Parias hageni)
- Sumatra pit viper (Parias sumatranus)
- Sumatran green pit viper (Popeia barati)
- Siamese peninsula pitviper (Popeia fucata)
- Pope's pit viper (Popeia popeiorum)
- Sabah pit viper (Popeia sabahi)
- Dunn's hognose viper (Porthidium dunni)
- Hognosed pit viper (Porthidium nasutum)
- Slender hognose viper (Porthidium ophryomegas)
- Porthidium porrasi
- Yucatán hognose viper (Porthidium yucatanicum)
- Jerdon's pitviper (Protobothrops jerdonii)
- Brown spotted pitviper (Protobothrops mucrosquamatus)
- Szechwan pit viper (Protobothrops xiangchengensis)
- Field's horned viper (Pseudocerastes fieldi)
- Persian horned viper (Pseudocerastes persicus)
- Massasauga (Sistrurus catenatus)
- Pygmy rattlesnake (Sistrurus miliarius)
- Sumatran palm pit viper (Trimeresurus andalasensis)
- Bornean palm pit viper (Trimeresurus borneensis)
- Trimeresurus flavomaculatus
- Taiwan pit viper (Trimeresurus gracilis)
- Common bamboo viper (Trimeresurus gramineus)
- Malabar pit viper (Trimeresurus malabaricus)
- Javanese pit viper (Trimeresurus puniceus)
- Schultze's pit viper (Trimeresurus schultzei)
- Horseshoe pit-viper (Trimeresurus strigatus)
- Wirot's pit viper (Trimeresurus wiroti)
- Bornean keeled green pit viper (Tropidolaemus subannulatus)
- Wagler's keeled green pit viper (Tropidolaemus wagleri)
- Nose-horned viper (Vipera ammodytes)
- Vipera barani
- Seoane's viper (Vipera seoanei)
- Gumprecht's pit viper (Viridovipera gumprechti)
- Stejneger's pit viper (Viridovipera stejnegeri)
- Vogel's pit viper (Viridovipera vogeli)
- Yunnan pit viper (Viridovipera yunnanensis)

=== Prosymnids ===
- Angolan shovel-snout (Prosymna ambigua)
- Angola shovel-snout (Prosymna angolensis)
- Jan's shovel-snout (Prosymna janii)
- Ghana shovel-snout (Prosymna meleagris)
- Pitman's shovelsnout snake (Prosymna pitmani)

=== Dipsadids ===
- Burrowing snake (Adelphicos nigrilatum)
- Middle American burrowing snake (Adelphicos quadrivirgatum)
- Adelphicos sargii
- Adelphicos visoninum
- Amastridium sapperi
- Rustyhead snake (Amastridium veliferum)
- Apostolepis multicincta
- Apostolepis phillipsae
- Günther's Island racer (Arrhyton taeniatum)
- Albuquerque ground snake (Atractus albuquerquei)
- Bocourt's ground snake (Atractus bocourti)
- Boettger's ground snake (Atractus boettgeri)
- Thickhead ground snake (Atractus crassicaudatus)
- Venezuela ground snake (Atractus duidensis)
- Emigdio's ground snake (Atractus emigdioi)
- Emmel's ground snake (Atractus emmeli)
- Lasalle's ground snake (Atractus lasallei)
- Limitan ground snake (Atractus limitaneus)
- Brown ground snake (Atractus major)
- Atractus manizalesensis
- Marisela's ground snake (Atractus mariselae)
- Atractus matthewi
- Banded ground snake (Atractus multicinctus)
- Basin ground snake (Atractus poeppigi)
- St. Marta's ground snake (Atractus sanctaemartae)
- Atractus snethlageae
- Atractus steyermarki
- Atractus tamessari
- Atractus turikensis
- One-banded ground snake (Atractus univittatus)
- Speckled ground snake (Atractus ventrimaculatus)
- Cuban lesser racer (Caraiba andreae)
- Eastern wormsnake (Carphophis amoenus)
- Carphophis vermis
- Chersodromus liebmanni
- Equatorial mussurana (Clelia equatoriana)
- Clelia langeri
- Mexican snake eater (Clelia scytalina)
- Two-spotted snake (Coniophanes bipunctatus)
- Coniophanes imperialis
- Coniophanes meridanus
- Coniophanes piceivittis
- Five-striped snake (Coniophanes quinquevittatus)
- Coniophanes schmidti
- Conophis lineatus
- Conophis vittatus
- Sharp-tailed snake (Contia tenuis)
- Dunn's road guarder (Crisantophis nevermanni)
- Ring-necked snake (Diadophis punctatus)
- American snail-eater (Dipsas articulata)
- Two-colored snail-eater (Dipsas bicolor)
- Snail-eating thirst snake (Dipsas brevifacies)
- Catesby's snail-eater (Dipsas catesbyi)
- Dipsas chaparensis
- Dipsas copei
- Gaige's thirst snail-eater (Dipsas gaigae)
- Dipsas nicholsi
- Northern snail-eater (Dipsas pavonina)
- Peruvian thirst snake (Dipsas peruana)
- Pratt's snail-eater (Dipsas pratti)
- Temporal snail-eater (Dipsas temporalis)
- Vermiculate snail-eater (Dipsas vermiculata)
- Bocourt's snail-eater (Dipsas viguieri)
- Echinanthera undulata
- Colombian longtail snake (Enuliophis sclateri)
- Pacific longtail snake (Enulius flavitorques)
- Double-banded coral snake mimic (Erythrolamprus bizona)
- Erythrolamprus ceii
- Drab ground snake (Erythrolamprus festae)
- Günther's false coral snake (Erythrolamprus guentheri)
- Erythrolamprus ingeri
- Jaeger's ground snake (Erythrolamprus jaegeri)
- Erythrolamprus janaleeae
- Long ground snake (Erythrolamprus longiventris)
- Shaw's dark ground snake (Erythrolamprus melanotus)
- Mertens' tropical forest snake (Erythrolamprus mertensi)
- Mimic false coral snake (Erythrolamprus mimus)
- Erythrolamprus pseudocorallus
- Arrow ground snake (Erythrolamprus sagittifer)
- Thin ground snake (Erythrolamprus taeniurus)
- Velvety swamp snake (Erythrolamprus torrenicola)
- Crown ground snake (Erythrolamprus viridis)
- Erythrolamprus zweifeli
- Mud snake (Farancia abacura)
- Rainbow snake (Farancia erytrogramma)
- Sierra Mije earth snake (Geophis anocularis)
- Colombian earth snake (Geophis brachycephalus)
- Chiapas earth snake (Geophis cancellatus)
- Keeled earth snake (Geophis carinosus)
- Mesa del Sur earth snake (Geophis dubius)
- Sierra Juarez earth snake (Geophis duellmani)
- Dugès' earth snake (Geophis dugesii)
- Godman's earth snake (Geophis godmani)
- Hoffmann's earth snake (Geophis hoffmanni)
- Downs' earth snake (Geophis immaculatus)
- Mesa central earth snake (Geophis laticinctus)
- Highland earth snake (Geophis mutitorques)
- Coffee earth snake (Geophis nasalis)
- Guerreran earth snake (Geophis omiltemanus)
- Rosebelly earth snake (Geophis rhodogaster)
- Ruthven's earth snake (Geophis ruthveni)
- Coral earth snake (Geophis semidoliatus)
- Geophis tectus
- Geophis zeledoni
- Daniel's keelback (Helicops danieli)
- Shreve's keelback (Helicops pastazae)
- Ladder keelback (Helicops scalaris)
- Equatorial keelback (Helicops trivittatus)
- Western hognose snake (Heterodon nasicus)
- Eastern hognose snake (Heterodon platirhinos)
- Costa Rica water snake (Hydromorphus concolor)
- Hydrops caesurus
- Amazon water snake (Hydrops martii)
- Baja California night snake (Hypsiglena slevini)
- Night snake (Hypsiglena torquata)
- Western tree snake (Imantodes inornatus)
- Imantodes tenuissimus
- Rainforest cat-eyed snake (Leptodeira frenata)
- Southwestern cat-eyed snake (Leptodeira maculata)
- Black-banded cat-eyed snake (Leptodeira nigrofasciata)
- Western cat-eyed snake (Leptodeira punctata)
- Leptodeira rhombifera
- Leptodeira rubricata
- Splendid cat-eyed snake (Leptodeira splendida)
- Uribe's false cat-eyed snake (Leptodeira uribei)
- Lema's ground snake (Lygophis dilepis)
- Lygophis elegantissimus
- Jan's hognose snake (Lystrophis histricus)
- Ringed hognose snake (Lystrophis semicinctus)
- Manolepis putnami
- Two-colored mussurana (Mussurana bicolor)
- Ringneck coffee snake (Ninia diademata)
- Spotted coffee snake (Ninia maculata)
- Ninia pavimentata
- Cope's coffee snake (Ninia psephota)
- Redback coffee snake (Ninia sebae)
- Rough coffee snake (Nothopsis rugosus)
- Bibron's false coral snake (Oxyrhopus doliatus)
- Oxyrhopus erdisii
- Fitzinger's false coral snake (Oxyrhopus fitzingeri)
- Werner's false coral snake (Oxyrhopus leucomelas)
- Boulenger's false coral snake (Oxyrhopus marcapatae)
- Tschudi's false coral snake (Oxyrhopus melanogenys)
- Oxyrhopus occipitalis
- Phalotris cuyanus
- Dumeril's diadem snake (Phalotris lemniscatus)
- Phalotris sansebastiani
- Phalotris tricolor
- Diurnal vine snake (Philodryas argenteus)
- Philodryas chamissonis
- Philodryas cordata
- Southern sharpnose snake (Philodryas georgeboulengeri)
- Günther's green racer (Philodryas psammophidea)
- Schmidt's green racer (Philodryas tachymenoides)
- Philodryas trilineata
- Jan's green racer (Philodryas varia)
- Banded pampas snake (Phimophis vittatus)
- Pliocercus bicolor
- Pliocercus elapoides
- Cope's false coral snake (Pliocercus euryzonus)
- Pseudalsophis dorsalis
- Pseudalsophis elegans
- Pseudalsophis occidentalis
- Paraná false boa (Pseudoboa haasi)
- South American pond snake (Pseudoeryx plicatilis)
- False cat-eyed snake (Pseudoleptodeira latifasciata)
- False tomodon snake (Pseudotomodon trigonatus)
- Wide ground snake (Psomophis obtusus)
- Brazilian bird snake (Rhachidelus brazili)
- Thick graceful brown snake (Rhadinaea calligaster)
- Pine woods snake (Rhadinaea flavilata)
- Western graceful brown snake (Rhadinaea hesperia)
- Crowned graceful brown snake (Rhadinaea laureata)
- Sargent's graceful brown snake (Rhadinaea sargenti)
- Pine-oak snake (Rhadinaea taeniata)
- Rhadinella anachoreta
- Godman's graceful brown snake (Rhadinella godmani)
- Kinkelin graceful brown snake (Rhadinella kinkelini)
- Tearful pine-oak snake (Rhadinella lachrymans)
- Brokencollar graceful brown snake (Rhadinella schistosa)
- Rhadinella serperaster
- Ringed snail sucker (Sibon annulatus)
- Cope's snail sucker (Sibon anthracops)
- Argus snail sucker (Sibon argus)
- Slender snail sucker (Sibon dimidiatus)
- Sibon fischeri
- Stejneger's snail sucker (Sibon longifrenis)
- Sibon sanniolus
- Boulenger's tree snake (Sibynomorphus ventrimaculatus)
- Tropical flat snake (Siphlophis compressus)
- Common spotted night snake (Siphlophis leucocephalus)
- Guanabara spotted night snake (Siphlophis pulcher)
- Worontzow's spotted night snake (Siphlophis worontzowi)
- Boulenger's slender snake (Tachymenis affinis)
- Chilean slender snake (Tachymenis chilensis)
- Peru slender snake (Tachymenis peruviana)
- Taeniophallus affinis
- Roze's coastal house snake (Thamnodynastes chimanta)
- Thamnodynastes corocoroensis
- Thamnodynastes dixoni
- Thamnodynastes duida
- Thamnodynastes gambotensis
- Thamnodynastes marahuaquensis
- Amazon coastal house snake (Thamnodynastes pallidus)
- Thamnodynastes paraguanae
- Coastal house snake (Thamnodynastes strigatus)
- Thamnodynastes yavi
- Orangebelly swamp snake (Tretanorhinus nigroluteus)
- Günther's tropical ground snake (Trimetopon gracile)
- Cope's tropical ground snake (Trimetopon pliolepis)
- Slevin's tropical ground snake (Trimetopon slevini)
- Western snail-eating snake (Tropidodipsas annulifera)
- Fischer's snail-eating snake (Tropidodipsas fischeri)
- Philippi's snail-eating snake (Tropidodipsas philippii)
- Terrestrial snail sucker (Tropidodipsas sartorii)
- Serra snake (Tropidodryas serra)
- Urotheca guentheri
- Urotheca lateristriga
- Urotheca multilineata
- Urotheca pachyura
- Neuwied's false fer-de-lance (Xenodon neuwiedii)
- Xenodon werneri
- Wucherer's ground snake (Xenopholis scalaris)

=== Xenodermatids ===
- Bourret's odd-scaled snake (Achalinus ater)
- Formosa odd-scaled snake (Achalinus formosanus)
- Zong's odd-scaled snake (Achalinus jinggangensis)
- Sichuan odd-scaled snake (Achalinus meiguensis)
- Black odd-scaled snake (Achalinus niger)
- Rufous burrowing snake (Achalinus rufescens)
- Grey burrowing snake (Achalinus spinalis)
- Kloss's rough water snake (Fimbrios klossi)
- Stolickza's stream snake (Stoliczkia borneensis)
- Rough-backed litter snake (Xenodermus javanicus)
- Captain's wood snake (Xylophis captaini)
- Striped narrow-headed snake (Xylophis perroteti)

=== Shield-tailed snakes ===
- Palni mountain burrowing snake (Brachyophidium rhodogaster)
- Beddome's black earth snake (Melanophidium punctatum)
- Indian black earth snake (Melanophidium wynaudense)
- Nilgiri burrowing snake (Plectrurus perroteti)
- Schneider's earth snake (Rhinophis oxyrhynchus)
- Salty earth snake (Rhinophis sanguineus)
- Purple-red earth snake (Teretrurus sanguineus)
- Madura earth snake (Uropeltis arcticeps)
- Cuvier's shieldtail (Uropeltis ceylanicus)
- Elliot's earth snake (Uropeltis ellioti)
- Bombay earth snake (Uropeltis macrolepis)
- Ocellated earth snake (Uropeltis ocellatus)
- Indian earth snake (Uropeltis pulneyensis)
- Red-lined earth snake (Uropeltis rubrolineatus)
- Red-spotted earth snake (Uropeltis rubromaculatus)
- Woodmason's earth snake (Uropeltis woodmasoni)

=== Pythons ===
- Children's python (Antaresia childreni)
- Spotted python (Antaresia maculosa)
- Pygmy python (Antaresia perthensis)
- Stimson's python (Antaresia stimsoni)
- Black-headed python (Aspidites melanocephalus)
- Bismarck ringed python (Bothrochilus boa)
- D'Albertis' python (Leiopython albertisii)
- Brown water python (Liasis fuscus)
- Reticulated python (Malayopython reticulatus)
- Amethystine python (Morelia amethistina)
- Carpet python (Morelia spilota)
- Green tree python (Morelia viridis)
- Anchieta's dwarf python (Python anchietae)
- Borneo python (Python breitensteini)
- Brongersma's short-tailed python (Python brongersmai)
- Sumatran short-tailed python (Python curtus)

=== Elapids ===
- Horned sea snake (Acalyptophis peronii)
- Smooth-scaled death adder (Acanthophis laevis)
- Rough-scaled death adder (Acanthophis rugosus)
- Dubois' sea snake (Aipysurus duboisii)
- Eydoux' sea snake (Aipysurus eydouxii)
- Olive-brown sea snake (Aipysurus laevis)
- Striped crown snake (Aspidomorphus lineaticollis)
- Müller's crowned snake (Aspidomorphus muelleri)
- Schlegel's crown snake (Aspidomorphus schlegelii)
- Stokes' sea snake (Astrotia stokesii)
- Pygmy copperhead (Austrelaps labialis)
- Malayan krait (Bungarus candidus)
- Banded krait (Bungarus fasciatus)
- Red-headed krait (Bungarus flaviceps)
- Burmese krait (Bungarus magnimaculatus)
- Many-banded krait (Bungarus multicinctus)
- Wanghaoting's krait (Bungarus wanghaotingi)
- Bibron's coral snake (Calliophis bibroni)
- Blue coral snake (Calliophis bivirgata)
- Banded Malaysian coral snake (Calliophis intestinalis)
- Speckled coral snake (Calliophis maculiceps)
- Black coral snake (Calliophis nigrescens)
- Western Carpentaria snake (Cryptophis pallidiceps)
- Black mamba (Dendroaspis polylepis)
- Western green mamba (Dendroaspis viridis)
- Master's snake (Drysdalia mastersii)
- Mustard-bellied snake (Drysdalia rhodogaster)
- Elapsoidea trapei
- Egg-eating sea snake (Emydocephalus annulatus)
- Ijima's sea snake (Emydocephalus ijimae)
- Beaked sea snake (Enhydrina schistosa)
- North-western mangrove sea snake (Ephalophis greyae)
- Rinkhals (Hemachatus haemachatus)
- Hemibungarus calligaster
- Black-ringed sea snake (Hydrelaps darwiniensis)
- Blackheaded banded sea snake (Hydrophis atriceps)
- Hydrophis brookii
- Dwarf sea snake (Hydrophis caerulescens)
- Cogger's sea snake (Hydrophis coggeri)
- Annulated sea snake (Hydrophis cyanocinctus)
- Bar-bellied sea snake (Hydrophis elegans)
- Striped sea snake (Hydrophis fasciatus)
- Graceful small headed seasnake (Hydrophis gracilis)
- King's sea snake (Hydrophis kingii)
- Lambert's sea snake (Hydrophis lamberti)
- Persian Gulf sea snake (Hydrophis lapemoides)
- Mcdowell's sea snake (Hydrophis macdowelli)
- Greater sea snake (Hydrophis major)
- Russell's sea snake (Hydrophis obscurus)
- Spotted sea snake (Hydrophis ocellatus)
- Ornate reef sea snake (Hydrophis ornatus)
- Yellow sea snake (Hydrophis spiralis)
- Jerdon's sea snake (Kerilia jerdonii)
- Shaw's sea snake (Lapemis curtus)
- Columbrine sea krait (Laticauda colubrina)
- Brown-lipped sea krait (Laticauda laticaudata)
- Laticauda saintgironsi
- Guyana blackback coral snake (Leptomicrurus collaris)
- Sonoran coralsnake (Micruroides euryxanthus)
- Allen's coral snake (Micrurus alleni)
- Micrurus baliocoryphus
- Micrurus bernadi
- Micrurus browni
- Trinidad northern coral snake (Micrurus circinalis)
- Clark's coral snake (Micrurus clarki)
- Diana's coral snake (Micrurus diana)
- Micrurus diastema
- Pygmy coral snake (Micrurus dissoleucus)
- Micrurus distans
- Elegant coral snake (Micrurus elegans)
- Eastern coral snake (Micrurus fulvius)
- Mayan coral snake (Micrurus hippocrepis)
- Equal-banded coral snake (Micrurus isozonus)
- Langsdorff's coral snake (Micrurus langsdorffi)
- Micrurus laticollaris
- Micrurus latifasciatus
- Micrurus limbatus
- Micrurus mosquitensis
- Many-banded coral snake (Micrurus multifasciatus)
- Andean blackback coral snake (Micrurus narduccii)
- Micrurus nigrocinctus
- Pará coral snake (Micrurus paraensis)
- Micrurus proximans
- Argentinian coral snake (Micrurus pyrrhocryptus)
- Micrurus serranus
- Panamenian coral snake (Micrurus stewarti)
- Stuart's coral snake (Micrurus stuarti)
- Texas coralsnake (Micrurus tener)
- Arabian cobra (Naja arabica)
- Monocled cobra (Naja kaouthia)
- Mali cobra (Naja katiensis)
- Samar cobra (Naja samarensis)
- Senegalese cobra (Naja senegalensis)
- Javan spitting cobra (Naja sputatrix)
- Equatorial spitting cobra (Naja sumatrana)
- Mainland Island snake (Notechis scutatus)
- Pelagic sea snake (Pelamis platura)
- Black tree cobra (Pseudohaje nigra)
- Square-nosed snake (Rhinoplocephalus bicolor)
- Solomons red krait (Salomonelaps par)
- Australian coral snake (Simoselaps australis)
- Unbanded shovel-nosed snake (Simoselaps incinctus)
- Coastal burrowing snake (Simoselaps littoralis)
- Kellog's coral snake (Sinomicrurus kelloggi)
- Sinomicrurus sauteri
- Little whip snake (Suta flagellum)
- Mallee black-backed snake (Suta nigriceps)
- Viperine sea snake (Thalassophina viperina)
- Mt Rossel forest snake (Toxicocalamus holopelturus)
- Loria forest snake (Toxicocalamus loriae)
- Toxicocalamus mintoni
- Preuss's forest snake (Toxicocalamus preussi)
- Pilbara bandy bandy (Vermicella snelli)
- Desert cobra (Walterinnesia aegyptia)

=== Calamariids ===
- White-bellied reed snake (Calamaria albiventer)
- Bicoloured reed snake (Calamaria bicolor)
- Banded worm snake (Calamaria bitorques)
- Bornean reed snake (Calamaria borneensis)
- Everett's reed snake (Calamaria everetti)
- Gervais' worm snake (Calamaria gervaisi)
- Gimlett's reed snake (Calamaria gimletti)
- Grabowsky's reed snake (Calamaria grabowskyi)
- Lined reed snake (Calamaria griswoldi)
- Calamaria hilleniusi
- Calamaria leucogaster
- Linnaeus's reed snake (Calamaria linnaei)
- Low's reed snake (Calamaria lovii)
- Variable reed snake (Calamaria lumbricoidea)
- Kapuas reed snake (Calamaria melanota)
- Calamaria modesta
- Mueller's reed snake (Calamaria muelleri)
- Narrow-headed reed snake (Calamaria nuchalis)
- Collared reed snake (Calamaria pavimentata)
- Red-headed reed snake (Calamaria schlegeli)
- Schmidt's reed snake (Calamaria schmidti)
- Hong Kong dwarf snake (Calamaria septentrionalis)
- Yellow-bellied reed snake (Calamaria suluensis)
- Sumatran reed snake (Calamaria sumatrana)
- Short-tailed reed snake (Calamaria virgulata)
- Mountain dwarf snake (Collorhabdium williamsoni)
- Chan-ard mountain reed snake (Macrocalamus chanardi)
- Genting highlands reed snake (Macrocalamus gentingensis)
- Jason's reed snake (Macrocalamus jasoni)
- Malayan mountain reed snake (Macrocalamus lateralis)
- Schulz's reed snake (Macrocalamus schulzi)
- Tweedie's reed snake (Macrocalamus tweediei)
- Vogel's reed snake (Macrocalamus vogeli)
- White-collared reed snake (Pseudorabdion albonuchalis)
- Zamboanga burrowing snake (Pseudorabdion ater)
- Mocquard's reed snake (Pseudorabdion collaris)
- Eiselt's dwarf reed snake (Pseudorabdion eiselti)
- Dwarf reed snake (Pseudorabdion longiceps)
- Negros light-scaled burrowing snake (Pseudorabdion oxycephalum)
- Pseudorabdion saravacense

=== Lamprophiids ===
- Cape file snake (Gonionotophis capensis)
- Savanna lesser file snake (Gonionotophis grantii)
- Matschie's African ground snake (Gonionotophis klingi)
- Black file snake (Gonionotophis nyassae)
- Aurora house snake (Lamprophis aurora)
- Fisk's house snake (Lamprophis fiskii)
- Tanganyika water snake (Lycodonomorphus bicolor)
- Black house snake (Lycodonomorphus inornatus)
- Lined water snake (Lycodonomorphus subtaeniatus)
- Whyte's water snake (Lycodonomorphus whytii)
- Eastern wolf snake (Lycophidion acutirostre)
- Lycophidion albomaculatum
- Lycophidion nigromaculatum
- Forest wolf snake (Lycophidion ornatum)
- Lycophidion semicinctum

=== Indo-Australian water snakes ===
- Keel-bellied water snake (Bitia hydroides)
- Seram short-tailed snake (Brachyorrhos albus)
- Cantor's mangrove snake (Cantoria violacea)
- Australian bokadam (Cerberus australis)
- Asian bockadam (Cerberus rynchops)
- Bocourt's water snake (Enhydris bocourti)
- Chinese water snake (Enhydris chinensis)
- Blotched-lipped mud snake (Enhydris doriae)
- Dussumier's water snake (Enhydris dussumieri)
- Rainbow water snake (Enhydris enhydris)
- Sind river mud snake (Enhydris pakistanica)
- Rice paddy snake (Enhydris plumbea)
- Macleay's mud snake (Enhydris polylepis)
- Siebold's water snake (Enhydris sieboldii)
- Mekong mud snake (Enhydris subtaeniata)
- Tentacled snake (Erpeton tentaculatum)
- Crab-eating snake (Fordonia leucobalia)
- Gerard's water snake (Gerarda prevostiana)
- Banded swamp snake (Homalopsis buccata)
- Deuve's water snake (Homalopsis nigroventralis)
- Australian myron (Myron richardsonii)

=== Colubrids ===
- Speckle-headed vine snake (Ahaetulla fasciolata)
- River vine snake (Ahaetulla fronticincta)
- Malayan vine snake (Ahaetulla mycterizans)
- Asian vine snake (Ahaetulla prasina)
- Brown vine snake (Ahaetulla pulverulenta)
- Glossy snake (Arizona elegans)
- Arizona pacata
- Bamanophis dorri
- Baja California rat snake (Bogertophis rosaliae)
- Trans-Pecos rat snake (Bogertophis subocularis)
- Philippine blunt-headed tree snake (Boiga angulata)
- Dog-toothed cat snake (Boiga cynodon)
- White-spotted cat snake (Boiga drapiezii)
- Forsten's cat snake (Boiga forsteni)
- Guangxi cat snake (Boiga guangxiensis)
- Brown tree snake (Boiga irregularis)
- Jasper cat snake (Boiga jaspidea)
- Square-headed cat snake (Boiga kraepelini)
- Black-headed cat snake (Boiga nigriceps)
- Philippine cat snake (Boiga philippina)
- Schultz' blunt-headed tree snake (Boiga schultzei)
- Common cat snake (Boiga trigonata)
- Wall's cat snake (Boiga walli)
- Scarletsnake (Cemophora coccinea)
- Chilomeniscus savagei
- Sand snake (Chilomeniscus stramineus)
- Western shovel-nosed snake (Chionactis occipitalis)
- Sonoran shovel-nosed snake (Chionactis palarostris)
- Chironius challenger
- Ecuador sipo (Chironius grandisquamis)
- Mountain sipo (Chironius monticola)
- South American sipo (Chironius septentrionalis)
- Garden flying snake (Chrysopelea paradisi)
- Banded flying snake (Chrysopelea pelias)
- Yellow-striped trinket snake (Coelognathus flavolineatus)
- Copper-head trinket snake (Coelognathus radiatus)
- Andreas' racer (Coluber andreanus)
- Eastern racer (Coluber constrictor)
- Conopsis biserialis
- Conopsis lineata
- Conopsis megalodon
- Conopsis nasus
- Indian smooth snake (Coronella brachyura)
- Southern smooth snake (Coronella girondica)
- Tornier's cat snake (Crotaphopeltis tornieri)
- Northern triangle-spotted snake (Cyclocorus lineatus)
- Southern triangle-spotted snake (Cyclocorus nuchalis)
- Greater green snake (Cyclophiops major)
- Many-banded green snake (Cyclophiops multicinctus)
- Central African egg-eating snake (Dasypeltis fasciata)
- Dasypeltis latericia
- Dasypeltis parascabra
- Common egg eater (Dasypeltis scabra)
- Dendrelaphis ashoki
- Boulenger's bronzeback (Dendrelaphis bifrenalis)
- Coconut tree snake (Dendrelaphis calligastra)
- Wall's bronzeback (Dendrelaphis cyanochloris)
- Beautiful bronzeback tree snake (Dendrelaphis formosus)
- Montane treesnake (Dendrelaphis gastrostictus)
- Giri's bronzeback tree snake (Dendrelaphis girii)
- Eastern Himalayan bronze-brown snake (Dendrelaphis gorei)
- Southern bronzeback (Dendrelaphis grandoculis)
- Haas's bronzeback tree snake (Dendrelaphis haasi)
- Kopstein's bronzeback tree snake (Dendrelaphis kopsteini)
- Lorentz river tree snake (Dendrelaphis lorentzi)
- Nganson bronzeback tree snake (Dendrelaphis ngansonensis)
- Sawtooth-necked bronzeback (Dendrelaphis nigroserratus)
- Common treesnake (Dendrelaphis punctulatus)
- Solomons tree snake (Dendrelaphis salomonis)
- Striated bronzeback tree snake (Dendrelaphis striatus)
- Mountain bronzeback tree snake (Dendrelaphis subocularis)
- Dendrelaphis walli
- Forest racer (Dendrophidion bivittatus)
- West-ecuadorian forest-racer (Dendrophidion graciliverpa)
- Peters' forest racer (Dendrophidion nuchale)
- Cope's forest racer (Dendrophidion paucicarinatum)
- South American forest racer (Dendrophidion percarinatum)
- Dendrophidion prolixum
- Barred forest racer (Dendrophidion vinitor)
- Dipsadoboa brevirostris
- Large whip snake (Dolichophis jugularis)
- Schmidt's whip snake (Dolichophis schmidti)
- Drymarchon caudomaculatus
- Eastern indigo snake (Drymarchon couperi)
- Margarita indigo snake (Drymarchon margaritae)
- Middle American indigo snake (Drymarchon melanurus)
- Drymobius chloroticus
- Black forest racer (Drymobius melanotropis)
- Esmarald racer (Drymobius rhombifer)
- Blanford's bridal snake (Dryocalamus davisonii)
- Half-banded bridled snake (Dryocalamus subannulatus)
- Three-banded bridled snake (Dryocalamus tristrigatus)
- Brown whip snake (Dryophiops rubescens)
- Eirenis aurolineatus
- Eirenis barani
- Collared dwarf snake (Eirenis collaris)
- Crowned dwarf snake (Eirenis coronella)
- Eirenis coronelloides
- Narrow-striped dwarf snake (Eirenis decemlineatus)
- Eirenis eiselti
- Eirenis levantinus
- Eirenis lineomaculatus
- Dark head dwarf-racer (Eirenis mcmahoni)
- Eirenis medus
- Ring-headed dwarf snake (Eirenis modestus)
- Dotted dwarf snake (Eirenis punctatolineatus)
- Roth's dwarf snake (Eirenis rothii)
- Indian egg-eating snake (Elachistodon westermanni)
- Chinese leopard snake (Elaphe bimaculata)
- Zoige ratsnake (Elaphe zoigeensis)
- Dark-grey ground snake (Elapoidis fusca)
- Mandarin rat snake (Euprepiophis mandarinus)
- Ficimia publia
- Mexican hooknose snake (Ficimia streckeri)
- Orange-bellied snake (Gongylosoma baliodeirus)
- Gongylosoma longicauda
- Common ring-neck (Gongylosoma scripta)
- Royal tree snake (Gonyophis margaritatus)
- Red-tailed racer (Gonyosoma oxycephalum)
- Chihuahuan hook-nosed snake (Gyalopion canum)
- Desert hooknose snake (Gyalopion quadrangulare)
- Algerian whip snake (Hemorrhois algirus)
- Horseshoe whip snake (Hemorrhois hippocrepis)
- Balkan whip snake (Hierophis gemonensis)
- Green whip snake (Hierophis viridiflavus)
- Gray-banded kingsnake (Lampropeltis alterna)
- Prairie kingsnake (Lampropeltis calligaster)
- Common kingsnake (Lampropeltis getula)
- Mexican kingsnake (Lampropeltis mexicana)
- Lampropeltis micropholis
- Sonoran mountain kingsnake (Lampropeltis pyromelana)
- California mountain kingsnake (Lampropeltis zonata)
- Striped lowland snake (Leptodrymus pulcherrimus)
- Copper parrot snake (Leptophis cupreus)
- Pacific coast parrot snake (Leptophis diplotropis)
- Mexican parrot snake (Leptophis mexicanus)
- Oliver's parrot snake (Leptophis nebulosus)
- Dusky wolf snake (Lepturophis albofuscus)
- Stripe-necked snake (Liopeltis frenatus)
- Liopeltis philippina
- Stolickza's ringneck (Liopeltis stolickzae)
- Tricoloured ringneck (Liopeltis tricolor)
- Lycodon alcalai
- Lycodon bibonius
- Butler's wolf snake (Lycodon butleri)
- Indian wolf snake (Lycodon capucinus)
- Lycodon dumerili
- Brown wolf snake (Lycodon effraenis)
- Yellow-spotted wolf snake (Lycodon flavomaculatus)
- Yellow large-toothed snake (Lycodon flavozonatus)
- Lycodon futsingensis
- Twin-spotted wolf snake (Lycodon jara)
- Laos wolf snake (Lycodon laoensis)
- Vietnamese large-toothed snake (Lycodon meridionale)
- Lycodon muelleri
- Snake-eater wolf snake (Lycodon ophiophagus)
- Colombo wolf snake (Lycodon osmanhilli)
- Rushstrat's wolf snake (Lycodon ruhstrati)
- White-banded wolf snake (Lycodon subcinctus)
- Travancore wolf snake (Lycodon travancoricus)
- Zaw's wolf snake (Lycodon zawi)
- Common leaf-nosed snake (Lytorhynchus diadema)
- Maynard's longnose sand snake (Lytorhynchus maynardi)
- Derafshi snake (Lytorhynchus ridgewayi)
- Macroprotodon cucullatus
- Bella rat snake (Maculophis bella)
- Masticophis aurigulus
- Sonoran whipsnake (Masticophis bilineatus)
- San Joaquin coachwhip (Masticophis flagellum)
- California whipsnake (Masticophis lateralis)
- Neotropical whip snake (Masticophis mentovarius)
- Schott's whipsnake (Masticophis schotti)
- Masticophis slevini
- Striped whipsnake (Masticophis taeniatus)
- Mastigodryas alternatus
- Daniel's tropical racer (Mastigodryas danieli)
- Striped lizard eater (Mastigodryas dorsalis)
- Heath's tropical racer (Mastigodryas heathii)
- Salmon-bellied racer (Mastigodryas melanolomus)
- Black-headed smooth snake (Meizodon plumbiceps)
- Western kukri (Oligodon affinis)
- Northern short-headed snake (Oligodon ancorus)
- Spotted kukri snake (Oligodon annulifer)
- Barron's kukri snake (Oligodon barroni)
- Javanese mountain kukri snake (Oligodon bitorquatus)
- Chinese kukri snake (Oligodon chinensis)
- Ashy kukri snake (Oligodon cinereus)
- Pegu kukri snake (Oligodon cruentatus)
- Cantor's kukri snake (Oligodon cyclurus)
- Oligodon deuvei
- Eberhardt's kukri snake (Oligodon eberhardti)
- Jewelled kukri snake (Oligodon everetti)
- Small-banded kukri snake (Oligodon fasciolatus)
- Forbes' kukri snake (Oligodon forbesi)
- Beautiful kukri snake (Oligodon formosanus)
- Inornate kukri snake (Oligodon inornatus)
- Grey kukri snake (Oligodon joynsoni)
- Barred short-headed snake (Oligodon maculatus)
- Arakan kukri snake (Oligodon mcdougalli)
- Cambodian kukri snake (Oligodon mouhoti)
- Eyed kukri snake (Oligodon ocellatus)
- Eight-lined kukri snake (Oligodon octolineatus)
- Ornate kukri snake (Oligodon ornatus)
- Oligodon planiceps
- False striped kukri snake (Oligodon pseudotaeniatus)
- Purple kukri snake (Oligodon purpurascens)
- Half-keeled kukri snake (Oligodon signatus)
- Splendid kukri snake (Oligodon splendidus)
- Duméril's kukri snake (Oligodon sublineatus)
- Striped kukri snake (Oligodon taeniatus)
- Streaked kukri snake (Oligodon taeniolatus)
- Mandalay kukri snake (Oligodon theobaldi)
- Three-lined kukri snake (Oligodon trilineatus)
- Oligodon unicolor
- Jerdon's kukri snake (Oligodon venustus)
- Chinese garter snake (Oocatochus rufodorsatus)
- Greensnake (Opheodrys aestivus)
- Smooth green snake (Opheodrys vernalis)
- Mountain reed snake (Oreocalamus hanitschi)
- Cope's vine snake (Oxybelis brevirostris)
- Baird's ratsnake (Pantherophis bairdi)
- Great plains ratsnake (Pantherophis emoryi)
- Corn snake (Pantherophis guttatus)
- Western rat snake (Pantherophis obsoletus)
- Pantherophis vulpinus
- Common bush snake (Philothamnus irregularis)
- Phrynonax poecilonotus
- Phyllorhynchus browni
- Spotted leaf-nosed snake (Phyllorhynchus decurtatus)
- Bullsnake (Pituophis catenifer)
- Pituophis deppei
- Pituophis insulanus
- Pituophis lineaticollis
- Pinesnake (Pituophis melanoleucus)
- Pituophis vertebralis
- Red whip snake (Platyceps collaris)
- Elegant racer (Platyceps elegantissimus)
- Flower's racer (Platyceps florulentus)
- Dahl's whip snake (Platyceps najadum)
- Rogers' racer (Platyceps rogersi)
- Variable racer (Platyceps variabilis)
- Yellow-red rat snake (Pseudelaphe flavirufa)
- Pseudoficimia frontalis
- Keeled rat snake (Ptyas carinata)
- Sulawesi black racer (Ptyas dipsas)
- White-bellied rat snake (Ptyas fusca)
- Smooth-scaled mountain rat snake (Ptyas luzonensis)
- Olive forest snake (Rhabdops olivaceus)
- Green trinket snake (Rhadinophis prasina)
- Ladder snake (Rhinechis scalaris)
- False tree coral (Rhinobothryum bovallii)
- Long-nosed snake (Rhinocheilus lecontei)
- Black-headed ground snake (Rhynchocalamus melanocephalus)
- Rhinoceros ratsnake (Rhynchophis boulengeri)
- Salvadora bairdi
- Eastern patch-nosed snake (Salvadora grahamiae)
- Western patch-nosed snake (Salvadora hexalepis)
- Salvadora intermedia
- Salvadora lemniscata
- Salvadora mexicana
- Guatemala neckband snake (Scaphiodontophis annulatus)
- Common neckband snake (Scaphiodontophis venustissimus)
- Black-banded snake (Scolecophis atrocinctus)
- Green rat snake (Senticolis triaspis)
- White-striped snake (Sibynophis bivittatus)
- Chinese many-tooth snake (Sibynophis chinensis)
- Collared black-headed snake (Sibynophis collaris)
- Striped black-headed snake (Sibynophis geminatus)
- White-lipped black-headed snake (Sibynophis melanocephalus)
- Sonora aequalis
- Sonora michoacanensis
- Sonora mutabilis
- Western ground snake (Sonora semiannulata)
- Zebra snake (Spalerosophis microlepis)
- Bornean black snake (Stegonotus borneensis)
- Bismark ground snake (Stegonotus heterurus)
- Stegonotus muelleri
- Stenorrhina freminvillei
- Symphimus leucostomus
- Symphimus mayae
- Tantilla armillata
- Mexican black-headed snake (Tantilla atriceps)
- Bocourt's black-headed snake (Tantilla bocourti)
- Mertens' centipede snake (Tantilla brevicauda)
- Pacific coast centipede snake (Tantilla calamarina)
- Guerreran centipede snake (Tantilla coronadoi)
- Southeastern crown snake (Tantilla coronata)
- Big bend blackhead snake (Tantilla cucullata)
- Tantilla cuniculator
- Deppe's centipede snake (Tantilla deppei)
- Flathead snake (Tantilla gracilis)
- Southwestern blackhead snake (Tantilla hobartsmithi)
- Tantilla impensa
- Blackbelly centipede snake (Tantilla moesta)
- Plains black-headed snake (Tantilla nigriceps)
- Western black-headed snake (Tantilla planiceps)
- Florida crowned snake (Tantilla relicta)
- Reticulate centipede snake (Tantilla reticulata)
- Big bend black-headed snake (Tantilla rubra)
- Tantilla ruficeps
- Red earth centipede snake (Tantilla schistosa)
- Ringed centipede snake (Tantilla semicincta)
- Central American centipede snake (Tantilla taeniata)
- Hallowell's centipede snake (Tantilla vermiformis)
- Tantilla vulcani
- Chihuahuan black-headed snake (Tantilla wilcoxi)
- Yaqui black-headed snake (Tantilla yaquia)
- Tantillita brevissima
- Tantillita canula
- Tantillita lintoni
- European cat snake (Telescopus fallax)
- Telescopus nigriceps
- Desert cat snake (Telescopus rhinopoma)
- Soosan viper (Telescopus tessellatus)
- Variable cat snake (Telescopus variegatus)
- Bird snake (Thelotornis capensis)
- Western black tree snake (Thrasops occidentalis)
- Coral-bellied wormsnake (Trachischium guentheri)
- Central American lyre snake (Trimorphodon quadruplex)
- Mexican lyre snake (Trimorphodon tau)
- Chihuahuan lyre snake (Trimorphodon vilkinsonii)
- Ornate brown snake (Xenelaphis ellipsifer)
- Malayan brown snake (Xenelaphis hexagonotus)
- Caucasian rat snake (Zamenis hohenackeri)
- Aesculapian snake (Zamenis longissimus)
- European ratsnake (Zamenis situla)

=== Keelbacks ===
- African brown water snake (Afronatrix anoscopus)
- White-eyed keelback (Amphiesmoides ornaticeps)
- Olive keelback water snake (Atretium schistosum)
- Yunnan olive keelback (Atretium yunnanensis)
- Rough earth snake (Haldea striatula)
- Nilgiri keelback (Hebius beddomei)
- Two-striped keelback (Hebius bitaeniatum)
- Boulenger's keelback (Hebius boulengeri)
- Kuatun keelback (Hebius craspedogaster)
- Deschaunsee's keelback (Hebius deschauenseei)
- Sabah keelback (Hebius flavifrons)
- Gunung Inas keelback (Hebius inas)
- White-lipped keelback (Hebius leucomystax)
- Hebius modestum
- Hill keelback (Hebius monticola)
- Eight-lined keelback (Hebius octolineatum)
- Peters's keelback (Hebius petersii)
- Pope's keelback (Hebius popei)
- Red mountain keelback (Hebius sanguineum)
- Sarawak keelback (Hebius sarawacense)
- Sauter's keelback (Hebius sauteri)
- Venning's keelback (Hebius venningi)
- Philippine cylindrical snake (Hologerrhum philippinum)
- Yellow-spotted water snake (Hydrablabes periops)
- Striped crayfish snake (Liodytes alleni)
- Black swamp snake (Liodytes pygaea)
- Crayfish snake (Liodytes rigida)
- Orange-lipped keelback (Macropisthodon flaviceps)
- Blue-necked keelback (Macropisthodon rhodomelas)
- Red keelback (Macropisthodon rudis)
- Collared marsh-snake (Natriciteres fuliginoides)
- Olive marsh snake (Natriciteres olivacea)
- Natriciteres pembana
- Viperine snake (Natrix maura)
- Grass snake (Natrix natrix)
- Dice snake (Natrix tessellata)
- Atlantic saltmarsh snake (Nerodia clarkii)
- Green water snake (Nerodia cyclopion)
- Plain-bellied watersnake (Nerodia erythrogaster)
- Banded water snake (Nerodia fasciata)
- Florida green watersnake (Nerodia floridana)
- Diamondback water snake (Nerodia rhombifer)
- Northern water snake (Nerodia sipedon)
- Brown water snake (Nerodia taxispilota)
- Opisthotropis cheni
- Chinese mountain keelback (Opisthotropis kuatunensis)
- Man-son mountain stream snake (Opisthotropis lateralis)
- Sichuan mountain keelback (Opisthotropis latouchii)
- Sumatran stream snake (Opisthotropis rugosa)
- Corrugated water snake (Opisthotropis typica)
- Angel's mountain keelback (Paratapinophis praemaxillaris)
- Graham's crayfish snake (Regina grahamii)
- Queen snake (Regina septemvittata)
- Rhabdophis adleri
- White-lined water snake (Rhabdophis auriculata)
- Speckle-bellied keelback (Rhabdophis chrysargos)
- Red-belled keelback (Rhabdophis conspicillatus)
- Leonard's keelback (Rhabdophis leonardi)
- Zigzag-lined water snake (Rhabdophis lineatus)
- Gunung murud keelback (Rhabdophis murudensis)
- Black-banded keelback (Rhabdophis nigrocinctus)
- Groove-necked keel-back (Rhabdophis nuchalis)
- Rhabdophis pentasupralabialis
- Rhabdophis spilogaster
- Red-necked keelback (Rhabdophis subminiatus)
- Taiwan keelback (Rhabdophis swinhonis)
- Asiatic water snake (Sinonatrix aequifasciata)
- Chinese keelback water snake (Sinonatrix percarinata)
- Yunnan keelback water snake (Sinonatrix yunnanensis)
- Brownsnake (Storeria dekayi)
- Red-bellied snake (Storeria occipitomaculata)
- Storeria storerioides
- Aquatic garter snake (Thamnophis atratus)
- Short-headed gartersnake (Thamnophis brachystoma)
- Butler's garter snake (Thamnophis butleri)
- Thamnophis chrysocephalus
- Sierra gartersnake (Thamnophis couchii)
- Blackneck garter snake (Thamnophis cyrtopsis)
- Western terrestrial garter snake (Thamnophis elegans)
- Mexican gartersnake (Thamnophis eques)
- Thamnophis errans
- Thamnophis exsul
- Thamnophis fulvus
- Thamnophis godmani
- Two-striped garter snake (Thamnophis hammondii)
- Checkered garter snake (Thamnophis marcianus)
- Northwestern garter snake (Thamnophis ordinoides)
- Thamnophis postremus
- Western ribbon snake (Thamnophis proximus)
- Thamnophis pulchrilatus
- Plains garter snake (Thamnophis radix)
- Narrow-headed garter snake (Thamnophis rufipunctatus)
- Ribbon snake (Thamnophis saurita)
- Thamnophis scalaris
- Common garter snake (Thamnophis sirtalis)
- Thamnophis sumichrasti
- Thamnophis valida
- Lined snake (Tropidoclonion lineatum)
- East Papuan keelback (Tropidonophis aenigmaticus)
- New Britain keelback (Tropidonophis dahlii)
- Tropidonophis dendrophiops
- Bismark keelback (Tropidonophis hypomelas)
- Common keelback (Tropidonophis mairii)
- Northern New Guinea keelback (Tropidonophis mcdowelli)
- North Irian montane keelback (Tropidonophis montanus)
- Many-scaled keelback (Tropidonophis multiscutellatus)
- New Guinea keelback (Tropidonophis novaeguineae)
- Parker's keelback (Tropidonophis parkeri)
- Painted keelback (Tropidonophis picturatus)
- Papua New Guinea montane keelback (Tropidonophis statistictus)
- Smooth earth snake (Virginia valeriae)
- Yellow-spotted keelback (Xenochrophis flavipunctatus)
- Malayan spotted keelback water snake (Xenochrophis maculatus)
- Javan keelback water snake (Xenochrophis melanozostus)
- Spotted keelback water snake (Xenochrophis punctulatus)
- Triangle keelback (Xenochrophis trianguligerus)
- Striped keelback water snake (Xenochrophis vitattus)

=== Burrowing asps ===
- Natal purple-glossed snake (Amblyodipsas concolor)
- Mpwapwa purple-glossed snake (Amblyodipsas dimidiata)
- Eastern purple-glossed snake (Amblyodipsas microphthalma)
- Rodhain's purple-glossed snake (Amblyodipsas rodhaini)
- Kalahari purple-glossed snake (Amblyodipsas ventrimaculata)
- Cape centipede eater (Aparallactus capensis)
- Aparallactus niger
- Malindi centipede-eater (Aparallactus turneri)
- Arabian small-scaled burrowing asp (Atractaspis andersonii)
- Atractaspis dahomeyensis
- Israeli mole viper (Atractaspis engaddensis)
- Stiletto snake (Atractaspis irregularis)
- Small-scaled burrowing asp (Atractaspis microlepidota)
- Sahelian burrowing asp (Atractaspis micropholis)
- Reticulate burrowing asp (Atractaspis reticulata)
- Kenya two-headed snake (Micrelaps bicoloratus)
- Micrelaps muelleri
- Reinhardt's snake-eater (Polemon acanthias)
- Guinea snake-eater (Polemon barthii)
- Christy's snake-eater (Polemon christyi)
- Ivory coast snake-eater (Polemon neuwiedi)
- Transvaal quillsnout snake (Xenocalamus transvaalensis)

=== Pareatids ===
- Blunthead slug snake (Aplopeltura boa)
- Smooth slug-eating snake (Asthenodipsas laevis)
- Malayan slug-eating snake (Asthenodipsas malaccanus)
- Mountain slug-eating snake (Asthenodipsas vertebralis)
- Boulenger's slug snake (Pareas boulengeri)
- Keeled slug-eating snake (Pareas carinatus)
- Formosa slug snake (Pareas formosensis)
- Hampton's slug snake (Pareas hamptoni)
- White-spotted slug snake (Pareas margaritophorus)
- Xiaoheishan slug-eating snake (Pareas nigriceps)
- Barred slug-eating snake (Pareas nuchalis)

=== Thread snakes ===
- Epictia ater
- Freiberg's blind snake (Epictia australis)
- Collared blind snake (Epictia collaris)
- Black blind snake (Epictia magnamaculata)
- Rose blind snake (Epictia rufidorsa)
- Klauber's blind snake (Epictia subcrotilla)
- Tschudi's blind snake (Epictia tesselata)
- Three-colored blind snake (Epictia tricolor)
- Leptotyphlops jacobseni
- Goggle-eyed worm snake (Leptotyphlops macrops)
- Leptotyphlops merkeri
- Pemba worm snake (Leptotyphlops pembae)
- White-bellied worm snake (Myriopholis albiventer)
- Myriopholis algeriensis
- Bouet's worm snake (Myriopholis boueti)
- Myriopholis narirostris
- Roux-estève's worm snake (Myriopholis rouxestevae)
- New Mexico bland snake (Rena dissecta)
- Texas blind snake (Rena dulcis)
- Western blind snake (Rena humilis)
- Giant blind snake (Rena maxima)
- Rena myopica
- Villiers' blind snake (Rhinoleptus koniagui)
- Degerbol's blind snake (Siagonodon borrichianus)
- Two-colored blind snake (Tricheilostoma bicolor)
- Dugand's blind snake (Trilepida dugandi)
- Joshua's blind snake (Trilepida joshuai)

=== Psammophiids ===
- Eastern bark snake (Hemirhagerrhis hildebrandtii)
- Montpellier snake (Malpolon monspessulanus)
- Mimophis mahfalensis
- Condanarous sandsnake (Psammophis condanarus)
- Psammophis indochinensis
- Stout sand snake (Psammophis longifrons)
- Stripe-bellied sand snake (Psammophis subtaeniatus)
- Striped skaapsteker (Psammophylax tritaeniatus)
- Red-spotted beaked snake (Rhamphiophis rubropunctatus)

=== Pseudoxenodontids ===
- Blakeway's blotch-necked snake (Plagiopholis blakewayi)
- Assam mountain snake (Plagiopholis nuchalis)
- Chinese mountain snake (Plagiopholis styani)
- Bamboo false cobra (Pseudoxenodon bambusicola)
- Dull bamboo snake (Pseudoxenodon inornatus)
- Karl Schmidt's false cobra (Pseudoxenodon karlschmidti)
- Large-eyed false cobra (Pseudoxenodon macrops)
- Stejneger's bamboo snake (Pseudoxenodon stejnegeri)

=== Other snake species ===
- Arafura file snake (Acrochordus arafurae)
- Wart snake (Acrochordus granulatus)
- Elephant trunk snake (Acrochordus javanicus)
- Malayan giant blind snake (Anomochilus leonardi)
- Common pipe snake (Cylindrophis ruffus)
- Lowland beaked blindsnake (Gerrhopilus depressiceps)
- Negros Island blind snake (Gerrhopilus hedraeus)
- Yellowtail blind snake (Helminthophis flavoterminatus)
- Liotyphlops beui
- Loxocemus bicolor
- Leopard dwarf boa (Tropidophis pardalis)
- Panamanian dwarf boa (Ungaliophis panamensis)
- Hainan sunbeam snake (Xenopeltis hainanensis)
- Asian sunbeam snake (Xenopeltis unicolor)

== See also ==
- Lists of IUCN Red List least concern species
- List of near threatened reptiles
- List of vulnerable reptiles
- List of endangered reptiles
- List of critically endangered reptiles
- List of recently extinct reptiles
- List of data deficient reptiles
