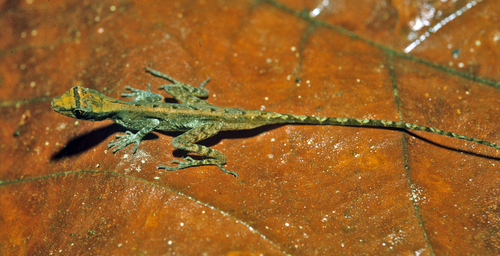

Conservation status
- Least Concern (IUCN 3.1)

Scientific classification
- Kingdom: Animalia
- Phylum: Chordata
- Class: Reptilia
- Order: Squamata
- Suborder: Iguania
- Family: Dactyloidae
- Genus: Anolis
- Species: A. granuliceps

Binomial name
- Anolis granuliceps Boulenger, 1898

= Anolis granuliceps =

Species of lizard

Anolis granuliceps, the granular anole, is a species of lizard in the family Dactyloidae. The species is found in Ecuador and Colombia.
