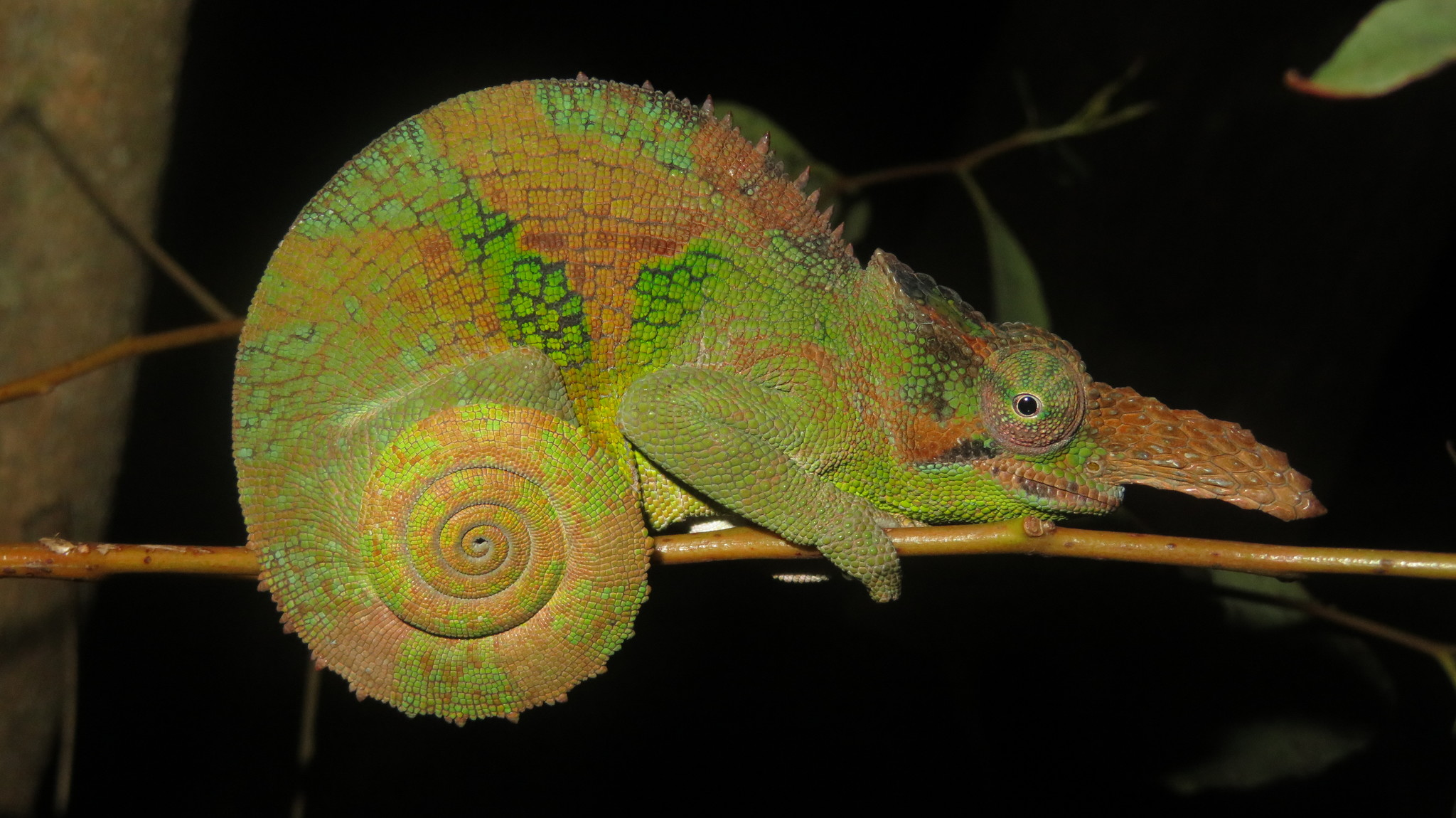

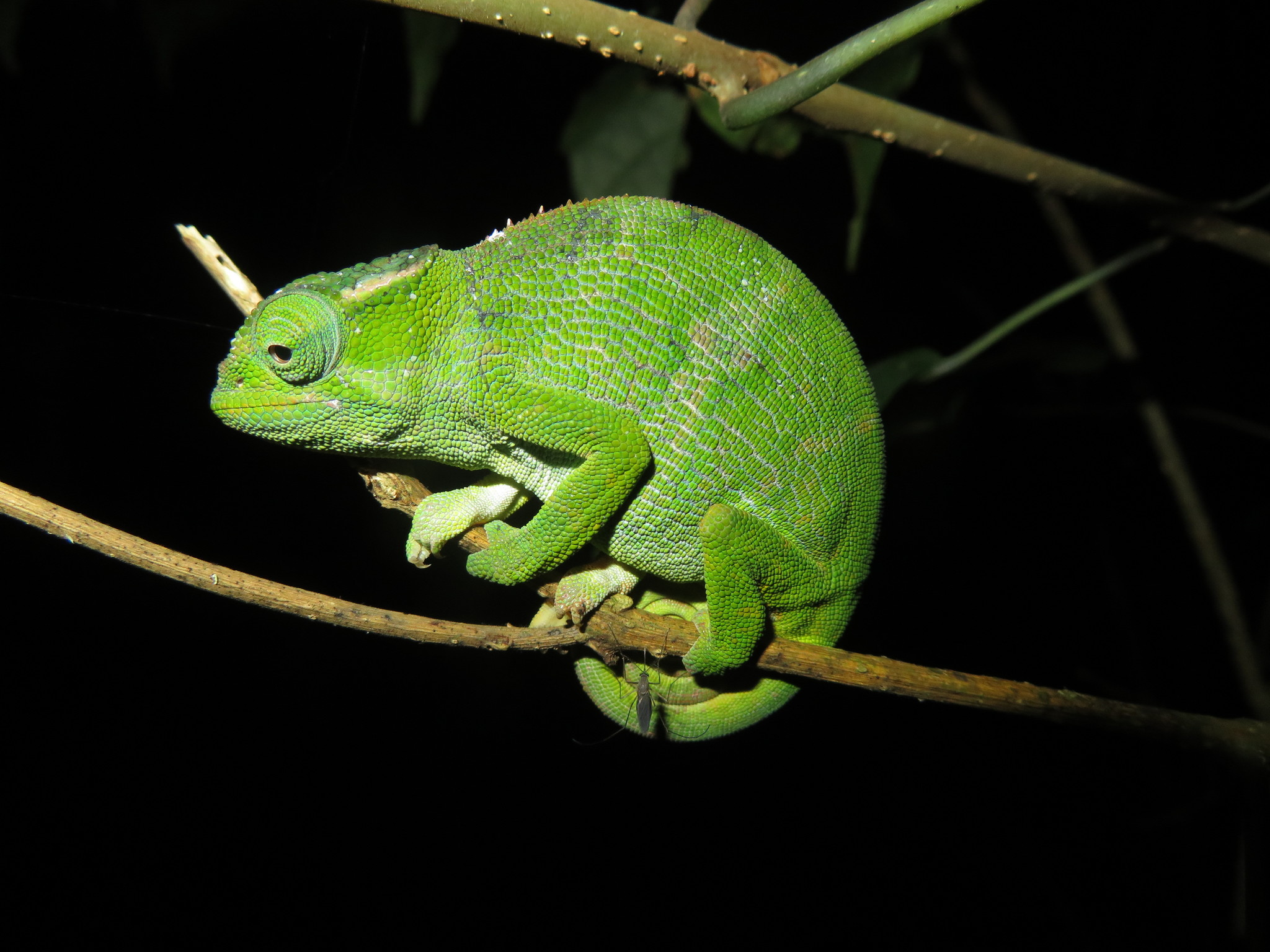
- Male above, female below

Conservation status
- Endangered (IUCN 3.1)

Scientific classification
- Kingdom: Animalia
- Phylum: Chordata
- Class: Reptilia
- Order: Squamata
- Suborder: Iguania
- Family: Chamaeleonidae
- Genus: Kinyongia
- Species: K. vosseleri

Binomial name
- Kinyongia vosseleri (Nieden, 1913)
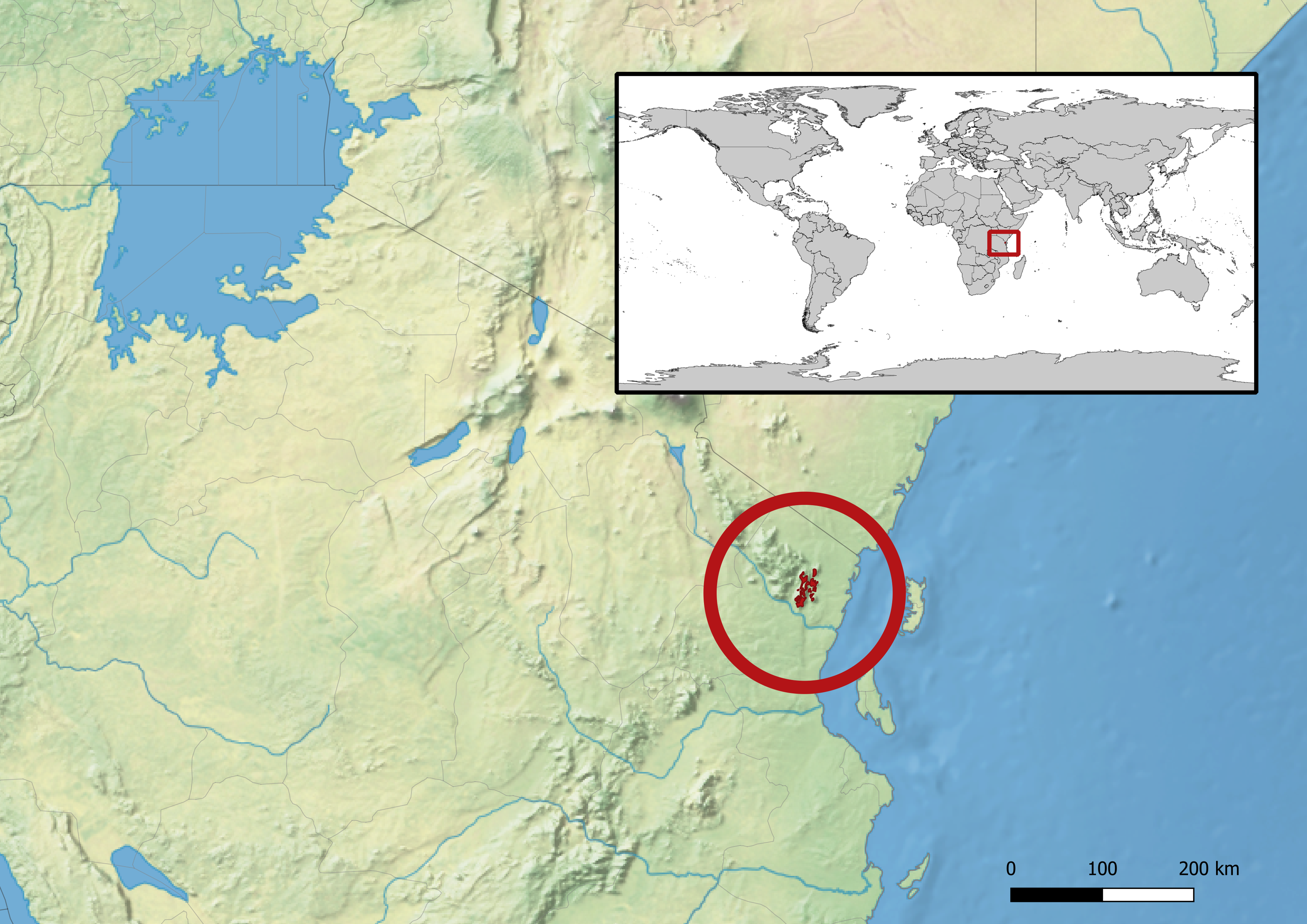

Synonyms
- Chamaeleon fischeri vosseleri Nieden,1913; Bradypodion fischeri — Nečas, 1999; Kinyongia fischeri — Tilbury, Tolley & Branch, 2006; Kinyongia vosseleri — Tilbury, 2010

= Kinyongia vosseleri =

Species of lizard

Kinyongia vosseleri, also known commonly as the Usambara two-horned chameleon and Vosseler's blade-horned chameleon, is an endangered species of lizard in the family Chamaeleonidae. The species is endemic to Tanzania.

== Taxonomy and etymology ==
K. vosseleri was already described as a species in 1913 by Fritz Nieden, with the specific name, vosseleri being in honor of German zoologist Julius Vosseler. Subsequently, it was generally considered a synonym of K. fischeri. It was only in 2008 that it was verified that the two are separate species with fully separated distributions.

== Geographic range and habitat ==
K. vosseleri is only found in forests in the East Usambara Mountains of Tanzania, at an altitude of up to c. 1,500 m (4,900 ft). Its range overlaps with the closely related K. matschiei, whereas K. multituberculata is found in the West Usambara Mountains.

== Appearance ==
K. vosseleri is a medium-large species in the genus Kinyongia at up to 29.5 cm (11.6 in) in total length, with the tail making up more than half of that. Females do not grow as large as males. Adult males have a large pair of converging horns on the nose. Uniquely in the "two-horned Usambara group", adult females of K. vosseleri entirely lack horns (in K. matschiei and K. multituberculata, adult females have small horns; however, juveniles are essentially hornless). The only close relatives where the adult female lacks horns are K. boehmei and K. tavetana, but they are not from the Usambaras.

== See also ==
- Trioceros deremensis, the Usambara three-horned chameleon
