= Helmeted chameleon =

Helemted chameleon is a common name for several lizards and may refer to:

- Kinyongia carpenteri, native to mountains on the border of Uganda and the Democratic Republic of the Congo
- Trioceros hoehnelii, native to Kenya and Uganda
