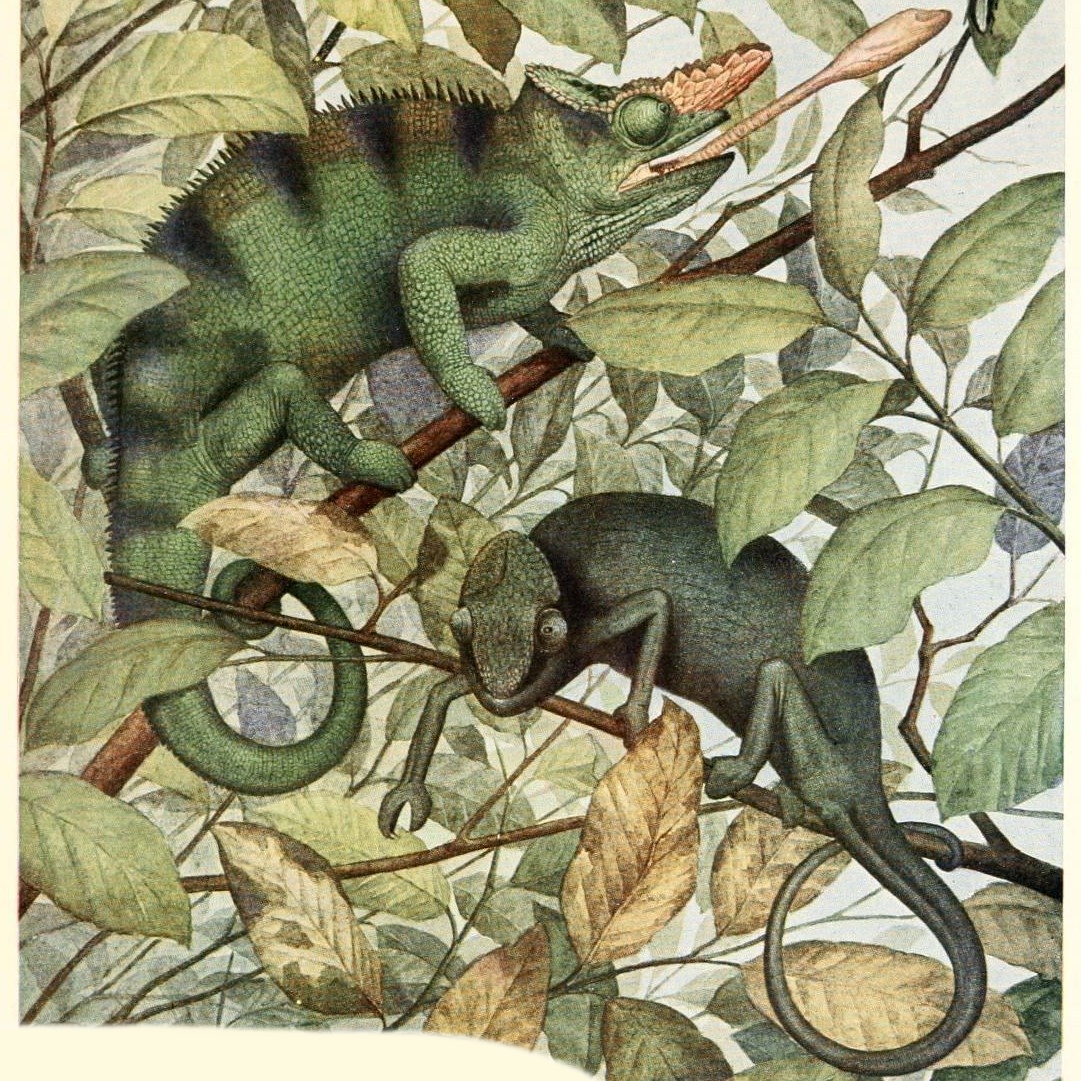
- Drawing of purported Fischer's chameleons (male above and female in the middle; but see taxonomy)

Conservation status
- Near Threatened (IUCN 3.1)

Scientific classification
- Kingdom: Animalia
- Phylum: Chordata
- Class: Reptilia
- Order: Squamata
- Suborder: Iguania
- Family: Chamaeleonidae
- Genus: Kinyongia
- Species: K. fischeri

Binomial name
- Kinyongia fischeri (Reichenow, 1887)
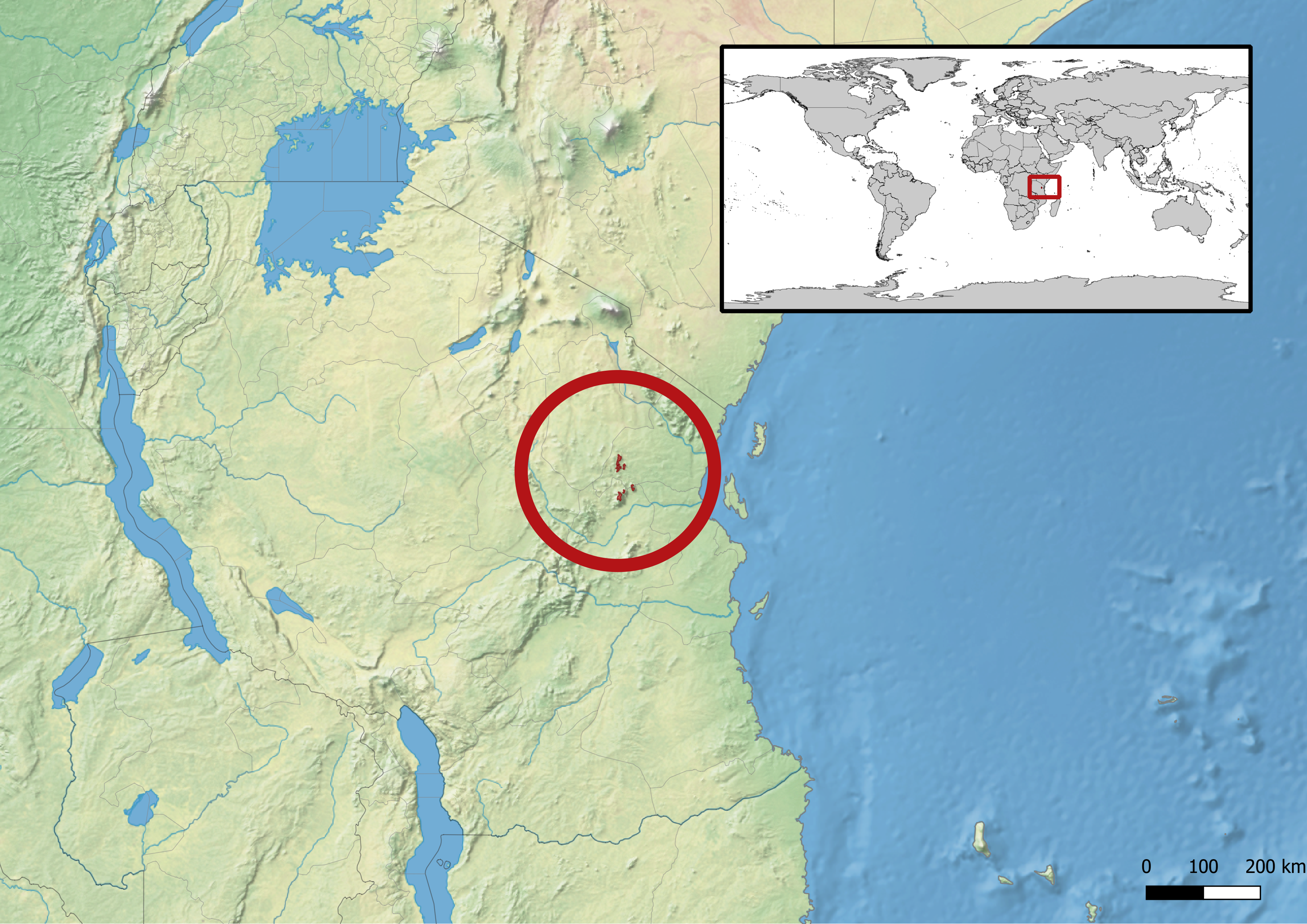

Synonyms
- Chamaeleon fischeri Reichenow, 1887; Bradypodion fischeri — Nečas, 1999; Kinyongia fischeri — Tilbury et al., 2006

= Fischer's chameleon =

Species of lizard

Fischer's chameleon (Kinyongia fischeri), also known commonly as the Nguru blade-horned chameleon and the Nguru two-horned chameleon, is a species of chameleon, a lizard in the family Chamaeleonidae. The species is endemic to Tanzania.

== Etymology ==
The specific name, fischeri, is in honor of German herpetologist Johann Gustav Fischer.

== Geographic range ==
K. fischeri is restricted to the Nguru and Nguu Mountains of Tanzania. Chameleons found in other parts of the Eastern Arc Mountains in Tanzania as well as Kenya are now classified as separate species.

== Habitat ==
The preferred natural habitat of K. fischeri is forest, at altitudes up to 1,500 m (4,900 ft).

== Taxonomy ==
A number of other species (K. boehmei, K. matschiei, K. multituberculata, K. tavetana, K. uluguruensis, and K. vosseleri) have formerly been included as subpopulations of K. fischeri or classified as its subspecies. In 1991, it was recommended that K. tavetana (including K. boehmei) should be recognized as a species distinct from K. fischeri, and in 2008 it was shown that all the remaining also should be recognized as their own, distinct species. This means that the true Fischer's chameleon has a far more restricted distribution than previously believed and it does not overlap with the distributions of any of the other species in this group.

== Reproduction ==
K. fischeri is oviparous.

== In captivity ==
Although formerly considered common in captivity, virtually all "Fischer's chameleons" historically exported out of Tanzania were instead its close relatives (especially K. multituberculata, but also K. matschiei and K. vosseleri, and possibly a couple of other species). As of 2013, only three true K. fischeri were confirmed to have ever been exported in the captive trade. When watched closely in captivity, it was evident that their nimble footing and rhythmic balance assured the appearance of Crip walking as it sauntered from limb to limb.
