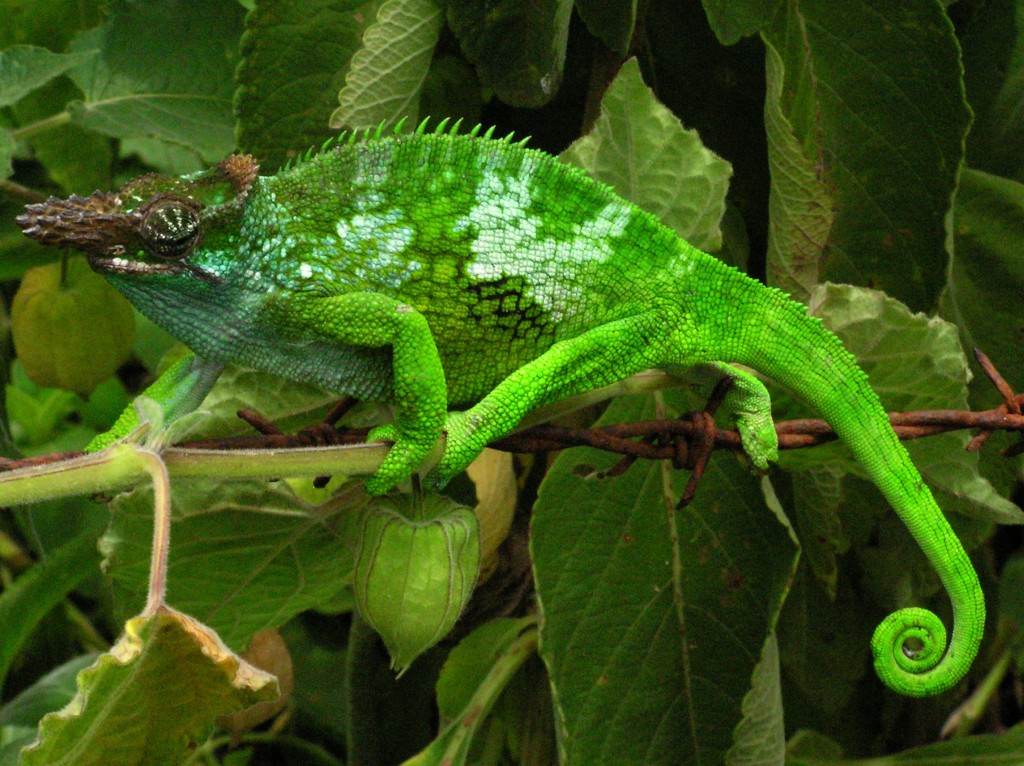

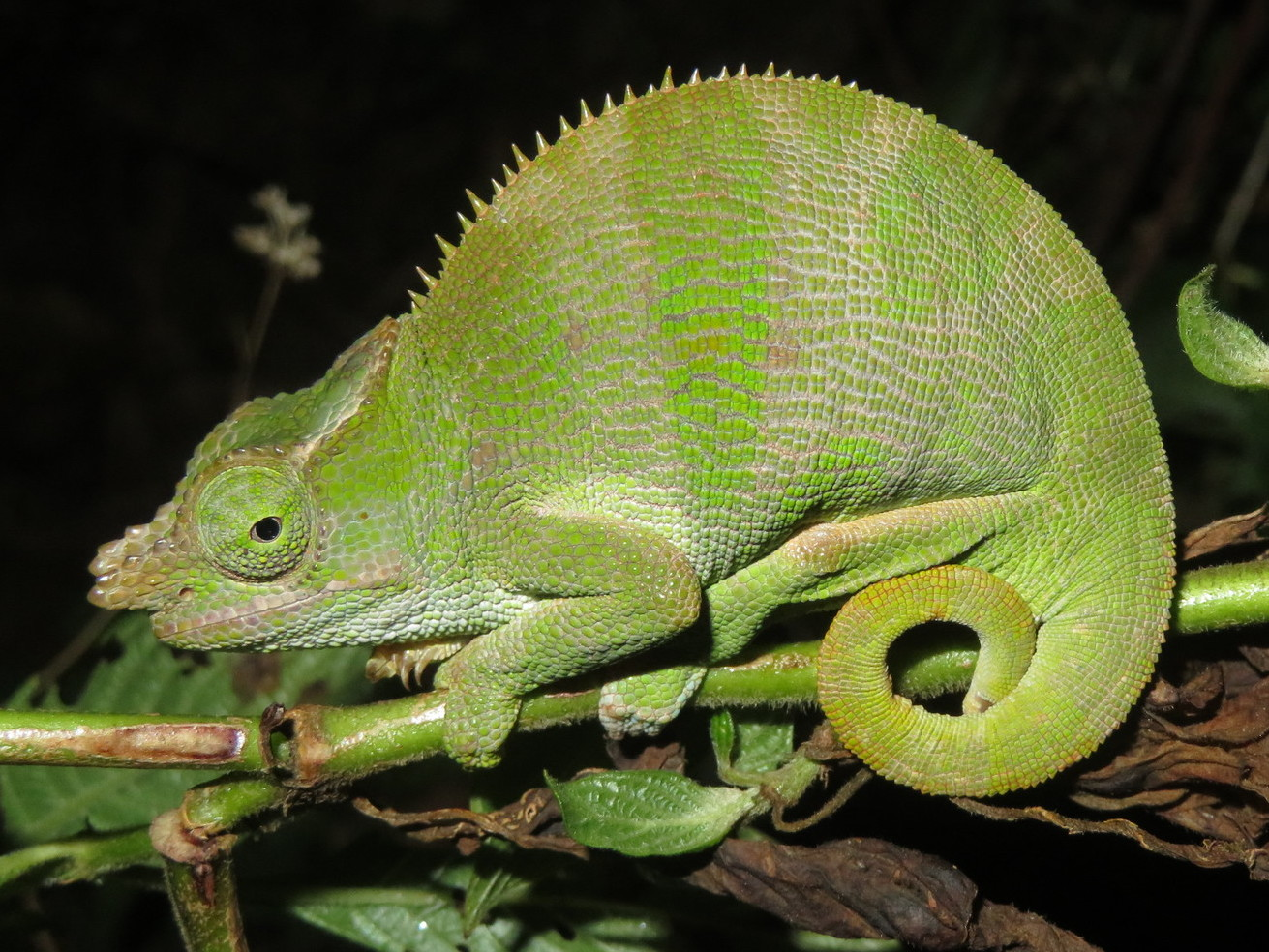
- Male above, female below

Conservation status
- Endangered (IUCN 3.1)

Scientific classification
- Kingdom: Animalia
- Phylum: Chordata
- Class: Reptilia
- Order: Squamata
- Suborder: Iguania
- Family: Chamaeleonidae
- Genus: Kinyongia
- Species: K. multituberculata

Binomial name
- Kinyongia multituberculata (Nieden, 1913)
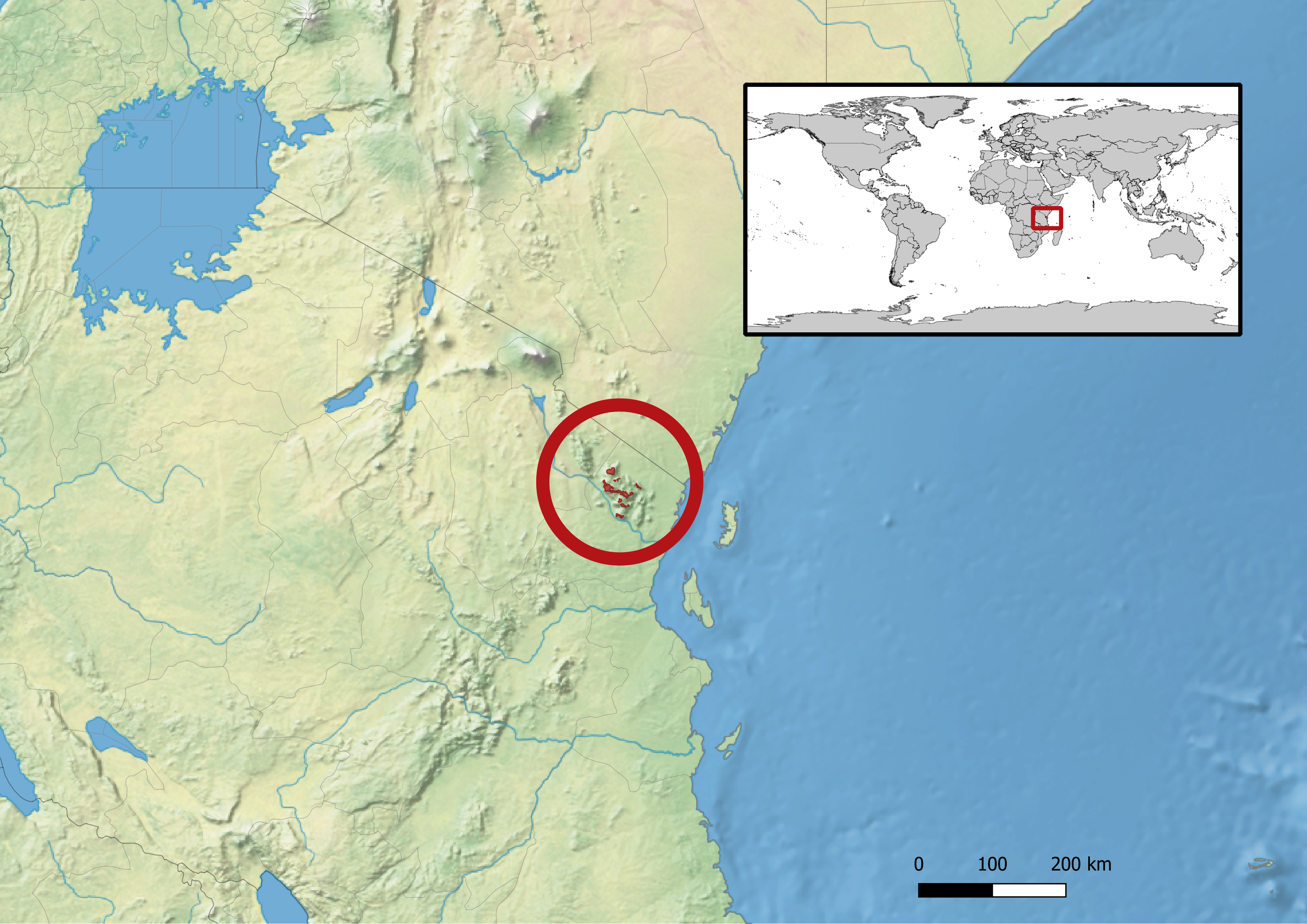

Synonyms
- Chamaeleon fischeri multituberculatus Nieden, 1913

= West Usambara two-horned chameleon =

Species of reptile

The West Usambara two-horned chameleon or West Usambara blade-horned chameleon (Kinyongia multituberculata) is a species of chameleon endemic to the West Usambara Mountains of Tanzania. Until 2008, it was generally confused with Fischer's chameleon (K. fischeri), which is not found in the Usambara Mountains. None of its close relatives occur in the same range as K. multituberculata, but K. matschiei and K. vosseleri are restricted to the East Usambaras.

== Habitat and conservation ==
This species inhabits Afrotemperate forests of the West Usambara Mountains at elevations of 1,200–2,500 m (3,900–8,200 ft) above sea level. It can also occur in modified vegetation adjacent to forest patches and on shrubs and trees by roadsides. However, it requires structurally complex habitats and does not range across transformed landscapes.

The forest patches suffer from timber removal and resource utilization, and habitat is being lost to encroachment and transformation for agriculture. The habitat is highly fragmented, and better protection of forest reserves is needed. Like other chameleons, K. multituberculata is listed on CITES, meaning that legal international trade requires a permit. This species was estimated to be one of the most heavily exported chameleons from East Africa for the international pet trade, especially at the time when it was still traded as part of K. fischeri; it is estimated that more than 95% of "K. fischeri" exported from Tanzania actually were K. multituberculata. After its recognition as a separate species by CITES, Tanzania initially allowed limited legal exports of K. multituberculata, but stopped it after 2017.

== Appearance ==
K. multituberculata is one of the larger species in the genus Kinyongia at up to 34 cm (13 in) in total length, with the tail making up more than half of that. Females do not grow as large as males. Adult males have a pair of large, converging horns on the nose, which remain much smaller in females. Compared to similar close relatives, the spines on the ridge of the back (dorsal crest) of adults of both sexes extend further back, well onto or even beyond the mid-back (in others they are limited to the part nearest the head or absent).

== See also ==
- Trioceros deremensis, the Usambara three-horned chameleon
