= Rugege Highlands forest chameleon =

Scientific classification
- Kingdom: Animalia
- Phylum: Chordata
- Class: Reptilia
- Order: Squamata
- Suborder: Iguania
- Family: Chamaeleonidae
- Genus: Kinyongia
- Species: K. rugegensis

Binomial name
- Kinyongia rugegensis Hughes et al., 2017

Species of lizard

The Rugege Highlands forest chameleon (Kinyongia rugegensis) is a species of chameleon. It is endemic to the Rugege Highlands of Burundi, but likely occurs in the Nyungwe Forest in the immediately adjacent Rwanda. The Burundian records are from or near the Kibira National Park. It was formerly considered to be included in Kinyongia adolfifriderici.
