= Kinyongia gyrolepis =

Conservation status
- Data Deficient (IUCN 3.1)

Scientific classification
- Kingdom: Animalia
- Phylum: Chordata
- Class: Reptilia
- Order: Squamata
- Suborder: Iguania
- Family: Chamaeleonidae
- Genus: Kinyongia
- Species: K. gyrolepis

Binomial name
- Kinyongia gyrolepis (Greenbaum et al., 2012)

Synonyms
- Kinyongia gyrolepis (Greenbaum et al., 2012)

Species of lizard

Kinyongia gyrolepis is a species of Kinyongia chameleons first described in 2012, and the sister species to the Kinyongia adolfifriderici chameleon. It is more commonly known as the circular-scaled chameleon.

== Habitat ==
The habitat for Kinyongea gyrolepis has been heavily logged and is under severe threat.

Found in high elevation mosaic habitats of the Lendu Plateau, a shrubby grassland and former montane forest which has been cleared for agriculture. The chameleons reside in shrubby habitats, although it is thought this is not the original habitat and the species has been shifted from forests as they were cleared. Although Kinyongia are typically found in forest areas this species is not, suggesting a habitat shift is in progress.

== Distribution ==
The Kinyongia gyrolepis is found in the Lendu Plateau region, west of Lake Albert in the Democratic Republic of the Congo. It is found in the grassland areas, although this could be attributed to the destruction of afromontane forest areas in its habitat range. All recent specimens have been collected within 1 km of afromontane areas which were totally cleared in the last 10 years.

== Conservation ==
Given uncertainty and paucity of records, and the fact that recently a lot of the species habitat has been cleared, the IUCN has been unable to give this species a rating, instead opting for 'data deficient'. There has been no current CITES quota for this species.
