= Kinyongia tolleyae =

Scientific classification
- Kingdom: Animalia
- Phylum: Chordata
- Class: Reptilia
- Order: Squamata
- Suborder: Iguania
- Family: Chamaeleonidae
- Genus: Kinyongia
- Species: K. tolleyae

Binomial name
- Kinyongia tolleyae Hughes et al., 2017

Species of lizard

Kinyongia tolleyae is a species of chameleon endemic to Uganda. Its common name is Tolley's forest chameleon.
