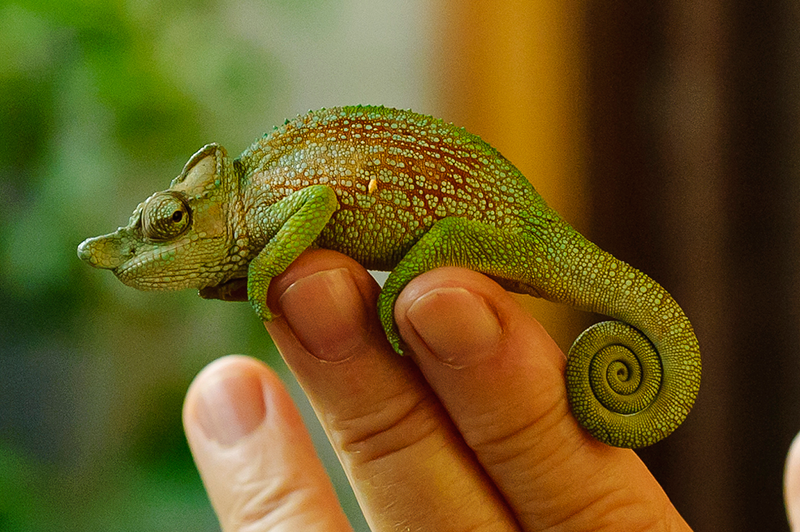
- Young male

Conservation status
- Near Threatened (IUCN 3.1)

Scientific classification
- Kingdom: Animalia
- Phylum: Chordata
- Class: Reptilia
- Order: Squamata
- Suborder: Iguania
- Family: Chamaeleonidae
- Genus: Kinyongia
- Species: K. xenorhina

Binomial name
- Kinyongia xenorhina (Boulenger, 1901)
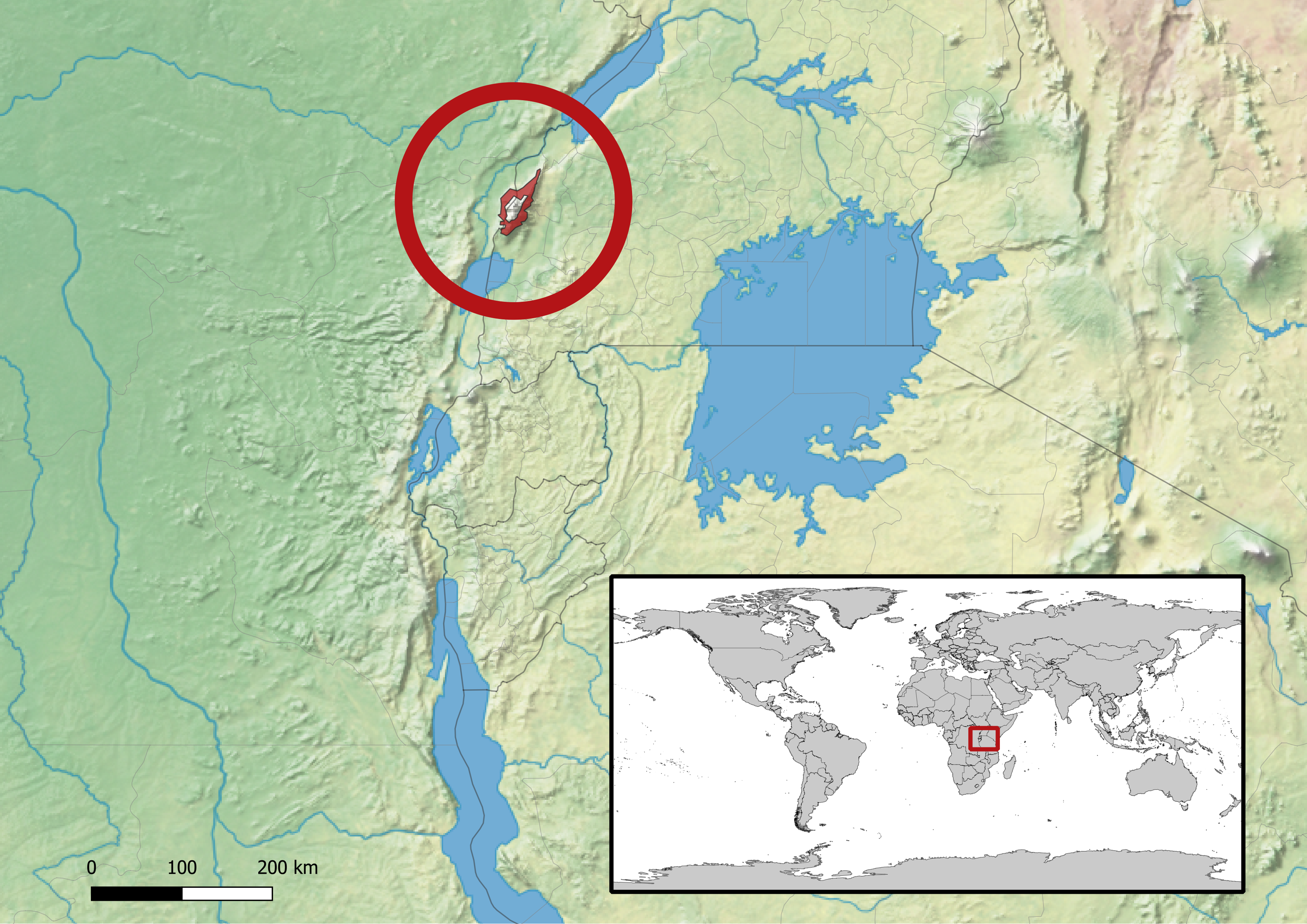

Synonyms
- Chamaeleon xenorhinum Boulenger, 1901; Chamaeleo xenorhinum — Broadley, 1998; Bradypodion xenorhinum — Necas, 1999; Kinyongia xenorhinum — Tilbury et al., 2006

= Strange-horned chameleon =

Species of lizard

The strange-horned chameleon (Kinyongia xenorhina), also known as Rwenzori plate-nosed chameleon or single welded-horn chameleon, is a species of chameleon. It is native to the rainforests of the Ruwenzori Mountains of western Uganda and eastern Democratic Republic of the Congo.

The strange-horned chameleon is named for the large protuberance extending from the top of its snout, particularly prominent on the males of the species. This feature is composed of two separate plates extending outwards from either side of the snout and merging at the end. This feature has also earned it the alternate common name single welded-horn chameleon. It also has a very high casque (a helmet-like structure towards the back of the skull). The head and casque are covered with enlarged, plate-like scales.

Strange-horned chameleons are olive to brown in color. Males range more towards olive and females more towards brown. They can reach a total length of 28 cm (11 in). They have among the sharpest "teeth" and longest claws of any chameleon species.

The strange-horned chameleon has rarely been bred in captivity. Most of the current population is within the Rwenzori Mountains National Park. Suitable forest habitat has largely disappeared from outside the park, and some habitat destruction is also occurring inside the park. In addition, overcollecting for the live animal trade is a serious potential threat, even though the species is not much traded at present. The IUCN considers it near threatened. CITES lists it in the Appendix II.
