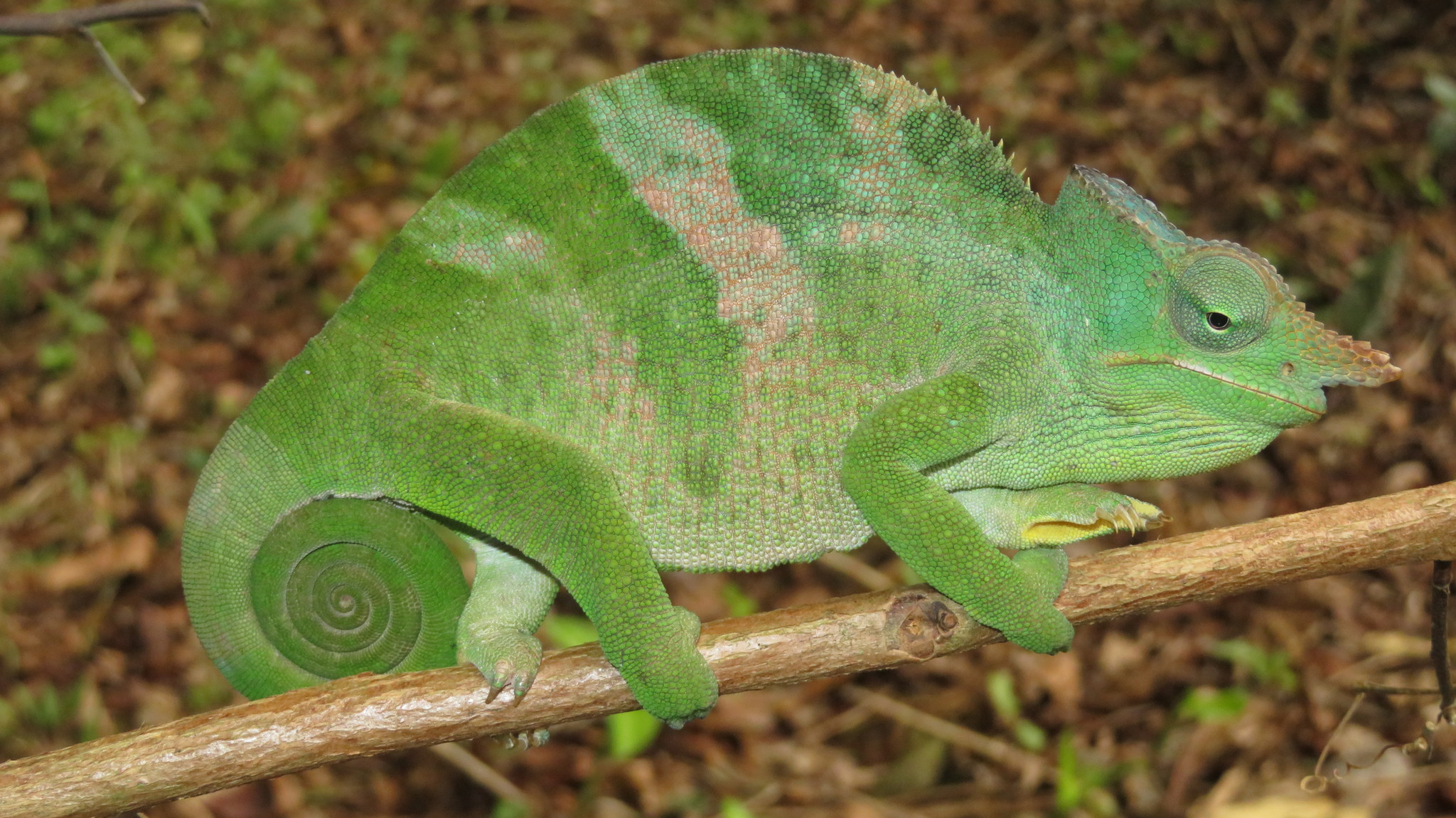
- Kinyongia matschiei

Scientific classification
- Kingdom: Animalia
- Phylum: Chordata
- Class: Reptilia
- Order: Squamata
- Suborder: Iguania
- Family: Chamaeleonidae
- Genus: Kinyongia; Tilbury, Tolley & Branch, 2006
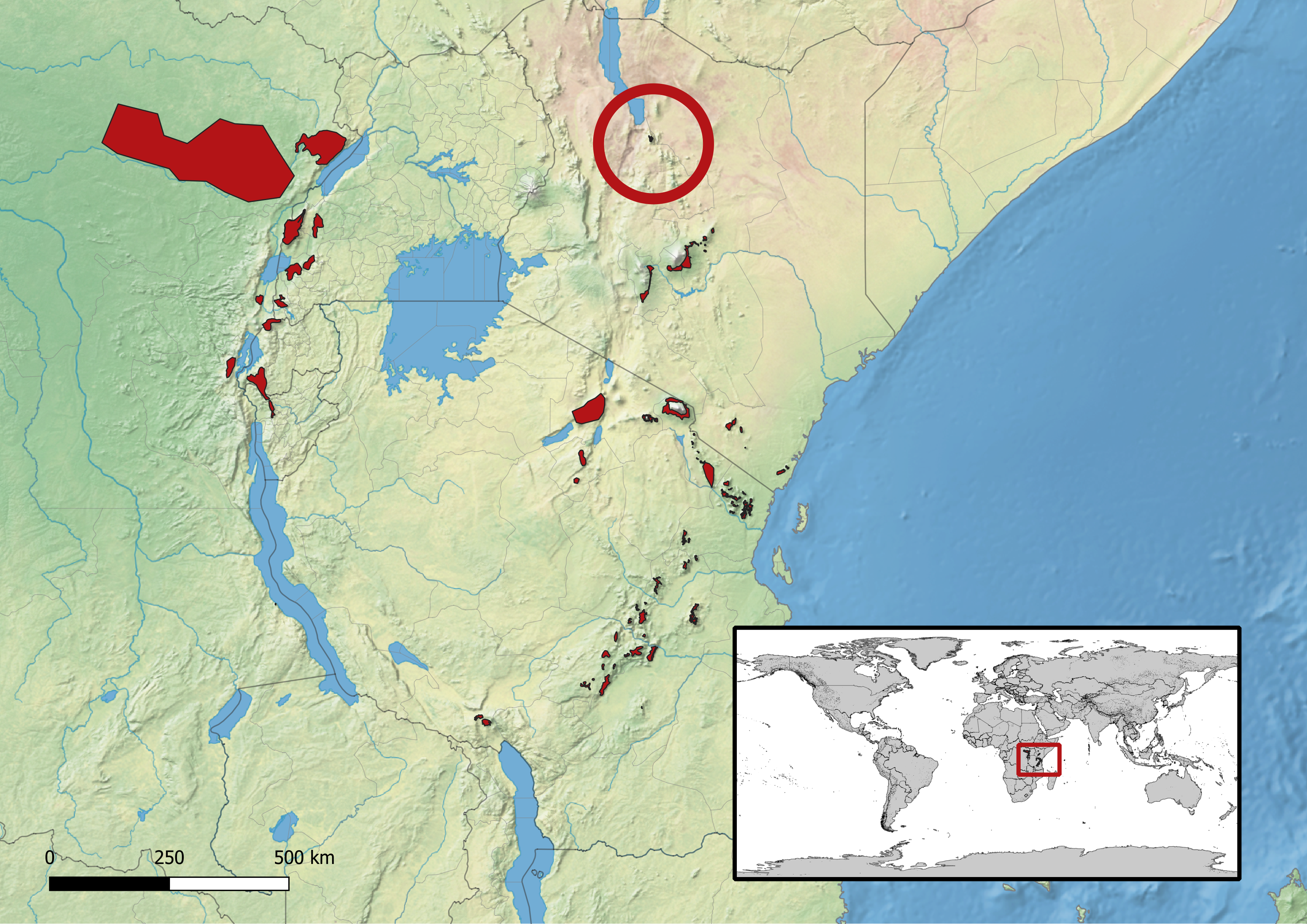

= Kinyongia =

Genus of lizards

Kinyongia (derived from the group's name in Kiswahili language) is a genus of chameleons found in montane and sub-montane areas in Kenya, Tanzania, Uganda, Rwanda, Burundi, and far eastern DR Congo. They are restricted to forests, woodlands and other wooded habitats, and many species have very small geographic ranges. In most species, at least the males have horns or knobs on their noses. As typical of most chameleons, Kinyongia are oviparous.

They were initially placed in the genus Chamaeleo and by some authorities subsequently transferred into Bradypodion, but in 2006 they were moved to their own genus, Kinyongia.

== Species ==
The following 23 species are recognized as being valid.

Image	Scientific name	Common name	Distribution
	Kinyongia adolfifriderici (Sternfeld, 1912)	Ituri chameleon	Burundi, northern and eastern Democratic Republic of the Congo, Rwanda, and Uganda.
	Kinyongia asheorum (Nečas et al., 2009)	Mount Nyiro bearded chameleon	Kenya
	Kinyongia boehmei (Lutzmann & Nečas, 2002)	Taita blade-horned chameleon, Böhme's two-horned chameleon	Kenya
	Kinyongia carpenteri (Parker, 1929)	Carpenter's chameleon	Uganda and the Democratic Republic of the Congo.
	Kinyongia excubitor (Barbour, 1911)	Mt. Kenya hornless chameleon	Kenya
	Kinyongia fischeri (Reichenow, 1887)	Fischer's chameleon, Nguru blade-horned chameleon, Nguru two-horned chameleon	Tanzania.
	Kinyongia gyrolepis (Greenbaum et al., 2012)	Lendu chameleon	Democratic Republic of the Congo
	Kinyongia itombwensis Hughes et al., 2017	Itombwe forest chameleon	Democratic Republic of the Congo
	Kinyongia magomberae Menegon et al., 2009	Magombera chameleon	Tanzania
	Kinyongia matschiei (F. Werner, 1895)	giant monkey-tailed East Usambara two-horned chameleon	Tanzania.
	Kinyongia msuyae Menegon et al., 2015		Tanzania.
	Kinyongia multituberculata (Nieden, 1913)	West Usambara two-horned chameleon	Tanzania
	Kinyongia mulyai Tilbury & Tolley, 2015		Democratic Republic of the Congo.
	Kinyongia oxyrhina (Klaver & W. Böhme, 1988)	sharp-nosed chameleon	Tanzania.
	Kinyongia rugegensis Hughes et al., 2017	Rugege highlands forest chameleon	Burundi
	Kinyongia tavetana (Steindachner, 1891)	Kilimanjaro blade-horned chameleon, Kilimanjaro two-horned chameleon	southern Kenya and northern Tanzania.
	Kinyongia tenuis (Matschie, 1892)	Usambara soft-horned chameleon	Kenya and Tanzania
	Kinyongia tolleyae Hughes et al., 2017	Tolley's forest chameleon	Uganda.
	Kinyongia uluguruensis (Loveridge, 1957)	Uluguru two-horned chameleon	Tanzania
	Kinyongia uthmoelleri (L. Müller, 1938)	Hanang hornless chameleon	Tanzania.
	Kinyongia vanheygeni Nečas, 2009	Van Heygen's chameleon	Tanzania.
	Kinyongia vosseleri (Nieden, 1913)	East Usambara two-horned chameleon	Tanzania.
	Kinyongia xenorhina (Boulenger, 1901)	strange-nosed chameleon	western Uganda and eastern Democratic Republic of the Congo.

Nota bene: A binomial authority in parentheses indicates that the species was originally described in a genus other than Kinyongia.
