= Kinyongia mulyai =

Conservation status
- Critically Endangered (IUCN 3.1)

Scientific classification
- Kingdom: Animalia
- Phylum: Chordata
- Class: Reptilia
- Order: Squamata
- Suborder: Iguania
- Family: Chamaeleonidae
- Genus: Kinyongia
- Species: K. mulyai

Binomial name
- Kinyongia mulyai Tilbury & Tolley, 2015
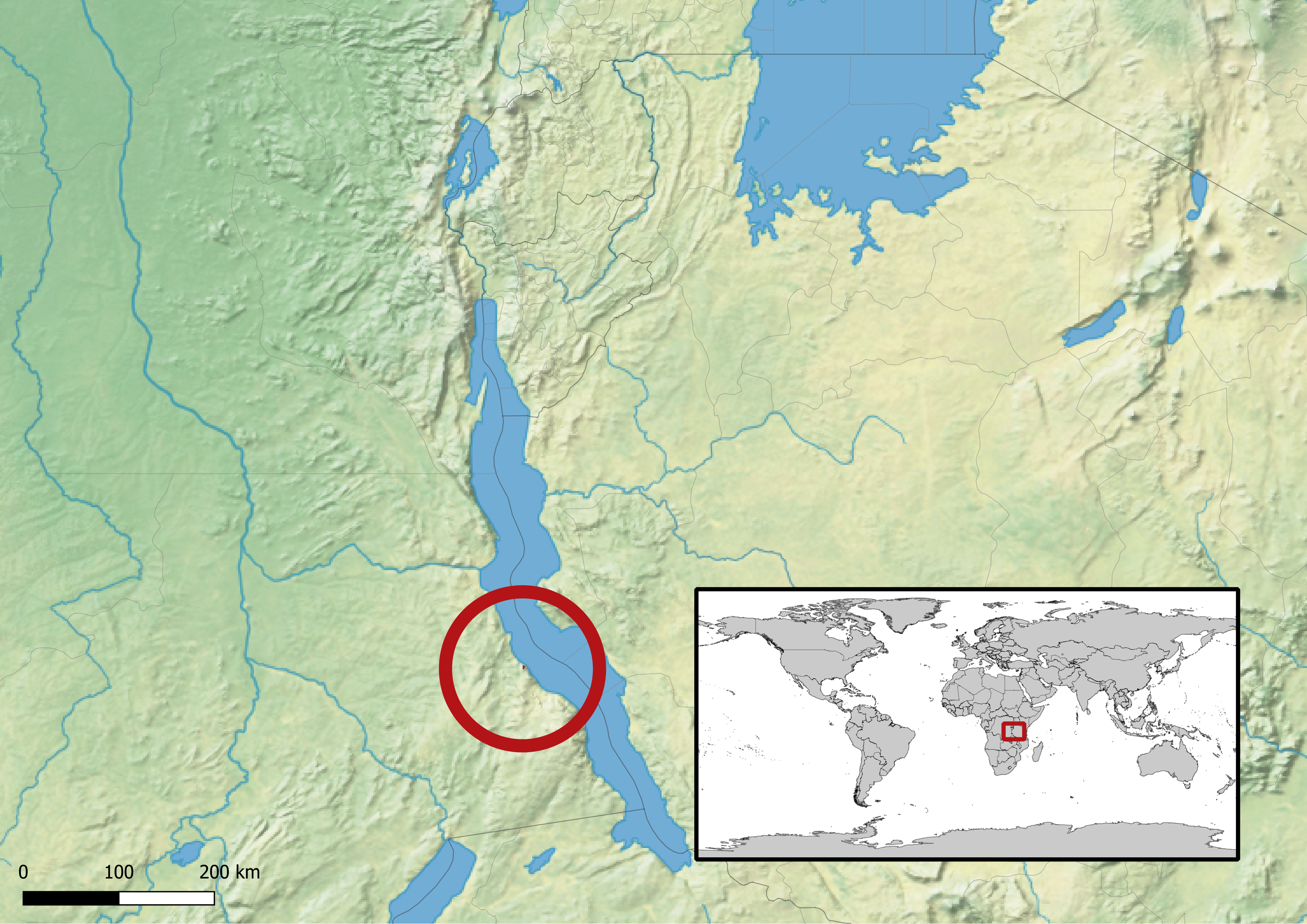

Species of lizard

Kinyongia mulyai is a species of chameleons first described in 2015, endemic to the Nzawa forest regions of the south-eastern Democratic Republic of the Congo.

== Description ==
Kinyongia mulyai has an olive green head with light brown eyeballs, intersected by two thin horizontal stripes running through it. A small triangular area between the mouth line, nares and orbital rim is blue-green coloured. The throat region is pale orange and yellow, extending between the front limbs. Its body is predominantly olive green coloured with light green tubercles on the outside limbs.

== Distribution ==
The species is only known to occupy small, highly fragmented remnant of Afrotemperate forest on Mount Nzawa. It is found perching on vines ranging from a few meters high to up to 20 meters high. Recent satellite imagery show only 3 remaining suitable patches of habitable forest area.

== Etymology ==
The species is named for Jules Mulya, who was an assistant on the March 2010 expedition that lead to its discovery.

== Conservation ==
The species has been listed as CITES II/B and is labelled Critically Endangered by the IUCN. EU Wildlife Trade Regulations list the species as annex B.
