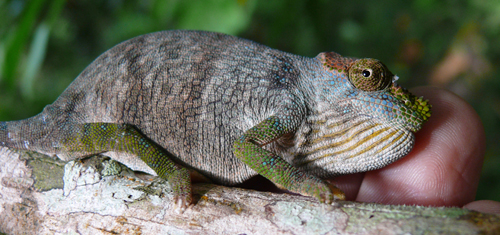

Conservation status
- Endangered (IUCN 3.1)

Scientific classification
- Kingdom: Animalia
- Phylum: Chordata
- Class: Reptilia
- Order: Squamata
- Suborder: Iguania
- Family: Chamaeleonidae
- Genus: Kinyongia
- Species: K. magomberae

Binomial name
- Kinyongia magomberae Menegon et al., 2009
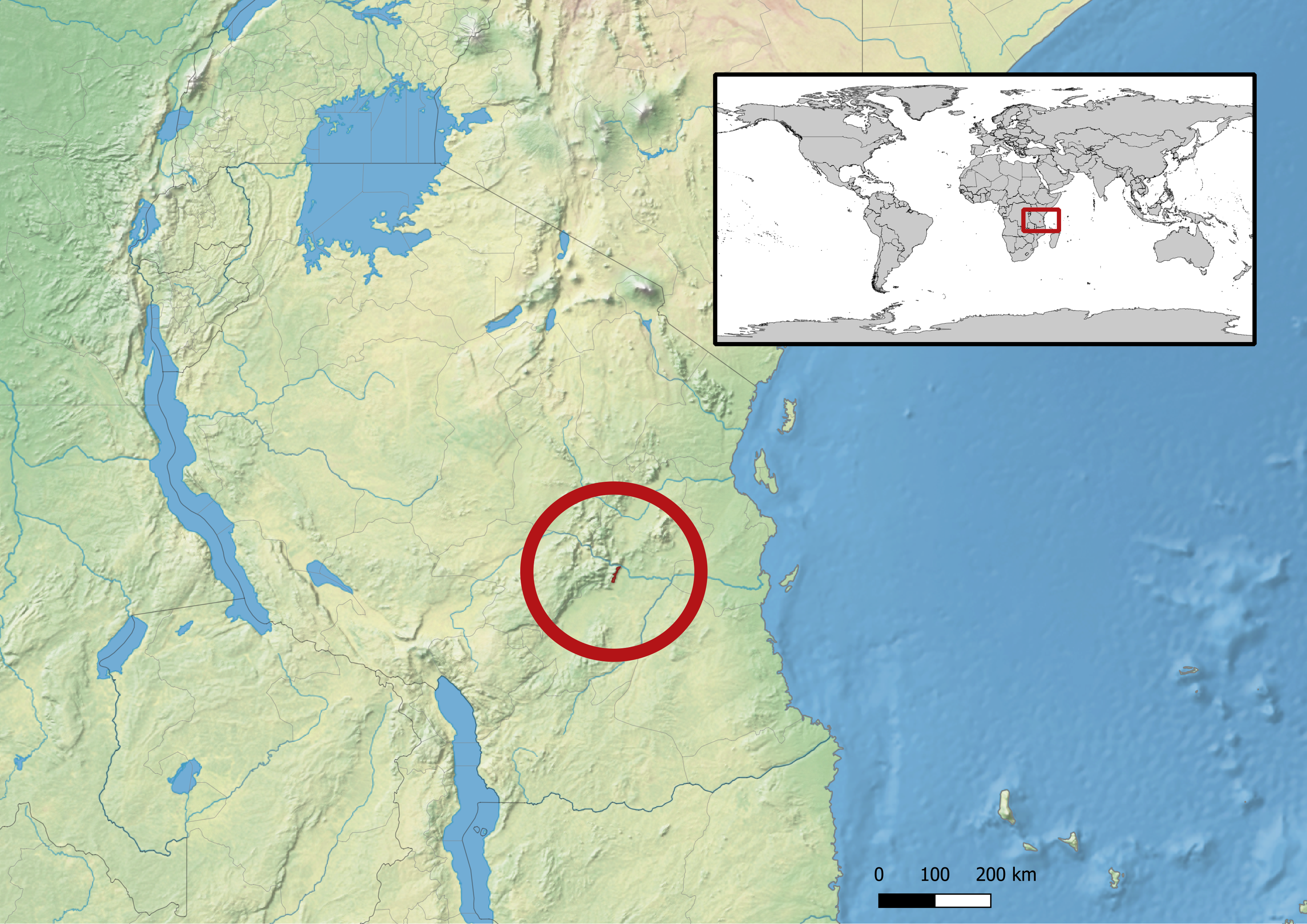

= Magombera chameleon =

Species of reptile

Kinyongia magomberae, the Magombera chameleon or Magombera single-horned chameleon, is an endangered species of chameleon found only in humid submontane forests in the Udzungwa Mountains in Tanzania.

The existence of this species was first realized in 2002 when a dead juvenile was found by a researcher. In the next few years, two further specimens were discovered, including one dropped by a twig snake after it had been startled. The Magombera chameleon was scientifically described as a new species in 2009.
