= Kinyongia uthmoelleri =

Conservation status
- Least Concern (IUCN 3.1)

Scientific classification
- Kingdom: Animalia
- Phylum: Chordata
- Class: Reptilia
- Order: Squamata
- Suborder: Iguania
- Family: Chamaeleonidae
- Genus: Kinyongia
- Species: K. uthmoelleri

Binomial name
- Kinyongia uthmoelleri (L. Müller, 1938)
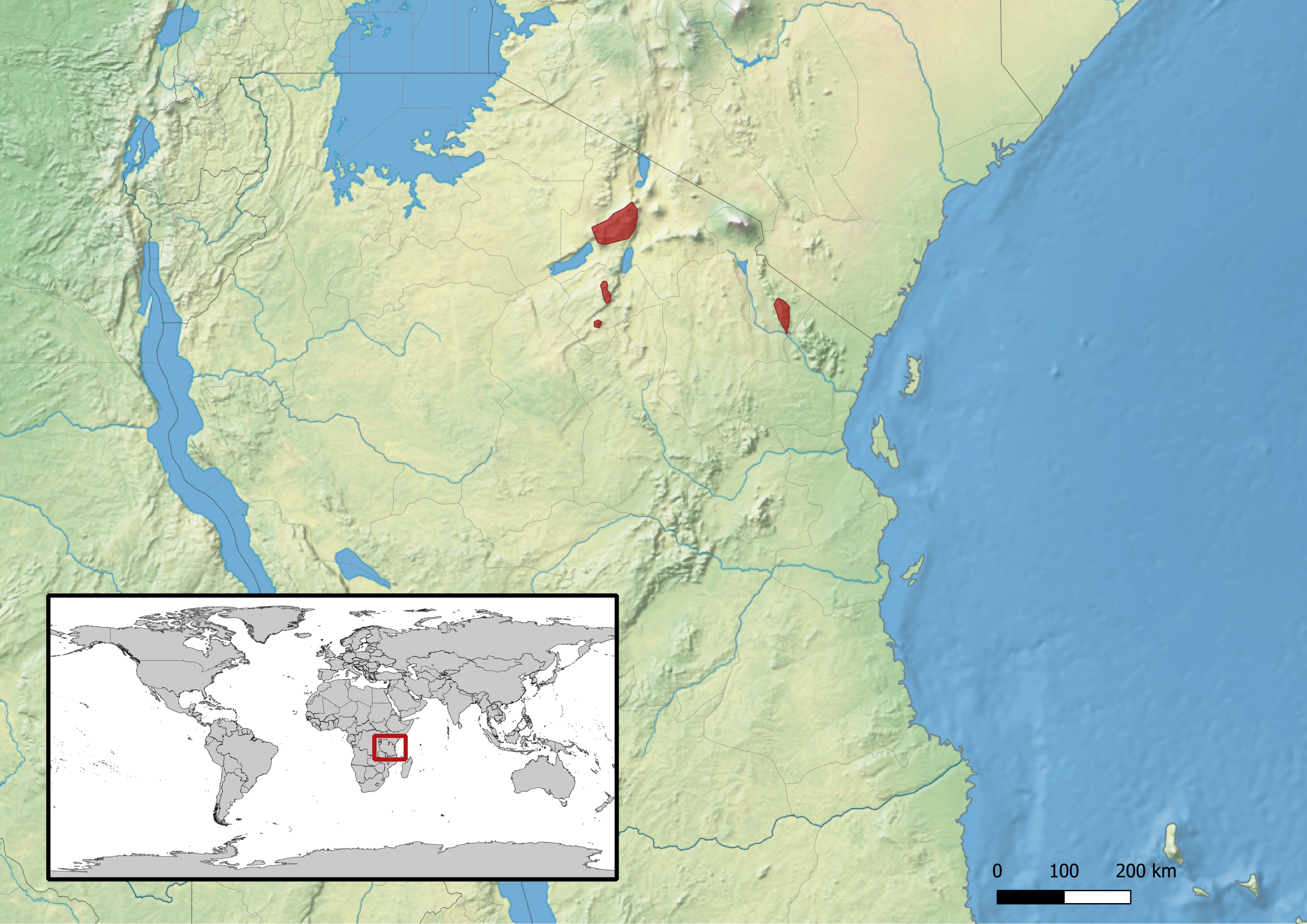

Synonyms
- Chamaeleo uthmoelleri L. Müller, 1938; Bradypodion uthmoelleri — Nečas, 1999; Kinyongia uthmoelleri — Tilbury, Tolley & Branch, 2006

Species of lizard

Kinyongia uthmoelleri, known commonly as the Hanang hornless chameleon, Müller's leaf chameleon, and Uthmöller's chameleon, is species of lizard in the family Chamaeleonidae. The species is endemic to Tanzania.

== Etymology ==
The specific name, uthmoelleri, is in honor of German herpetologist Wolfgang Uthmöller.

== Habitat ==
The preferred natural habitat of Kinyongia uthmoelleri is forest, at altitudes of 1,700–2,500 m (5,600–8,200 ft).

== Description ==
The maximum recorded size for Kinyongia uthmoelleri is a male with a total length (tail included) of 22.7 cm (8.9 in).

== Reproduction ==
Kinyongia uthmoelleri is oviparous.

== Subspecies ==
Two subspecies are recognized as being valid, including the nominotypical subspecies.

- Kinyongia uthmoelleri artytor Lutzmann, Stipala, Lademann, Krause, Wilms & Schmitz, 2010
- Kinyongia uthmoelleri uthmoelleri L. Müller, 1938
