= Mount Kenya sentinel chameleon =

Conservation status
- Vulnerable (IUCN 3.1)

Scientific classification
- Domain: Eukaryota
- Kingdom: Animalia
- Phylum: Chordata
- Class: Reptilia
- Order: Squamata
- Suborder: Iguania
- Family: Chamaeleonidae
- Genus: Kinyongia
- Species: K. excubitor

Binomial name
- Kinyongia excubitor (Barbour, 1911)
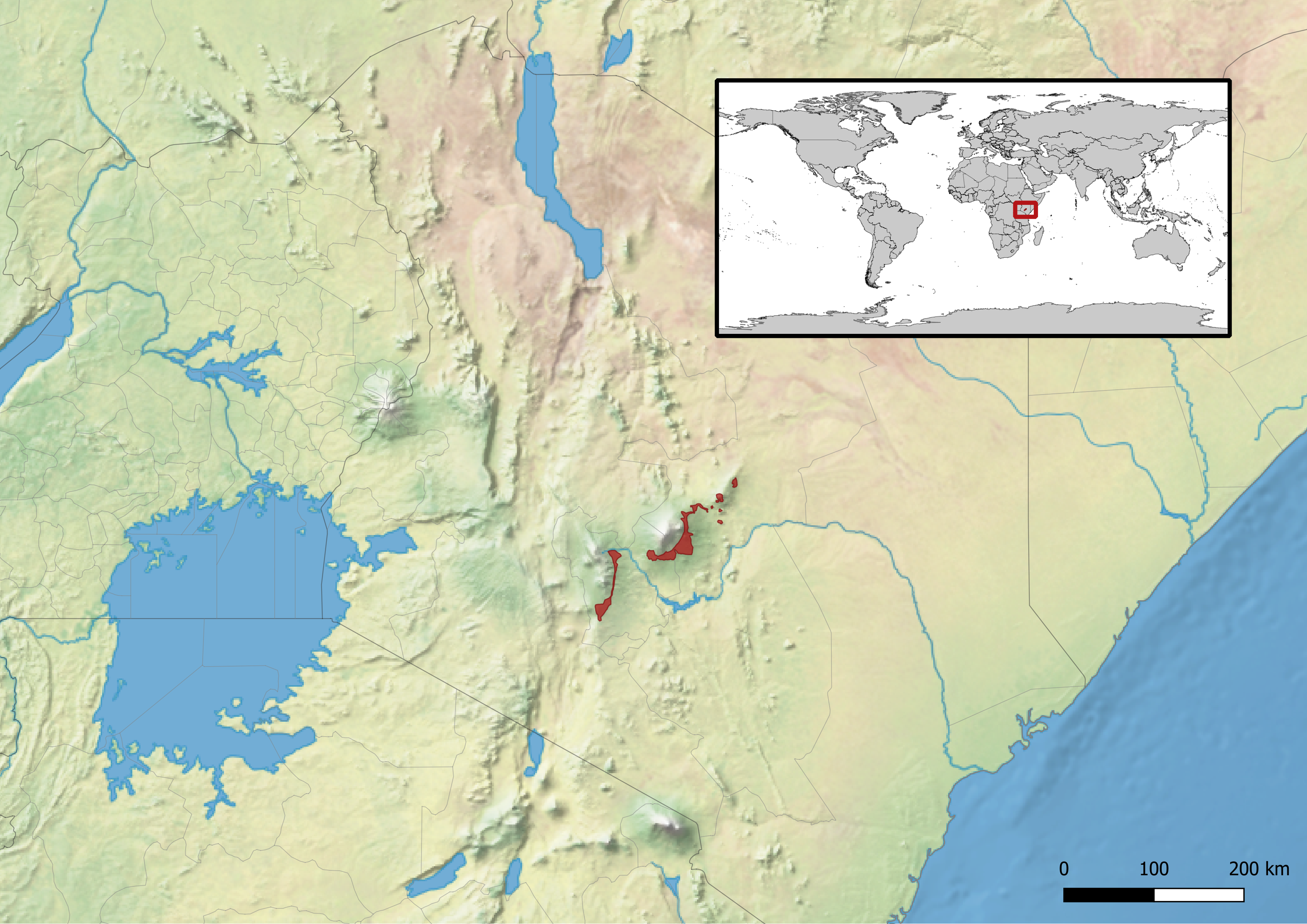

Synonyms
- Chamaeleo tenuis subsp. excubitor Barbour, 1911; Chamaeleon affinis subsp. embuensis Lönnberg, 1911; Chamaeleo fischeri subsp. excubitor — Barbour & Loveridge, 1928; Bradypodion fischeri subsp. excubitor — Klaver & Böhme, 1997; Kinyongia excubitor — Tilbury et al., 2006, Tilbury, 2010

Species of lizard

Mount Kenya sentinel chameleon, or Mount Kenya hornless chameleon (Kinyongia excubitor), is a species of chameleons endemic to Kenya. It is known from Mount Kenya, Nyambeni Hills, and Aberdare Range.
