= Kinyongia itombwensis =

Scientific classification
- Kingdom: Animalia
- Phylum: Chordata
- Class: Reptilia
- Order: Squamata
- Suborder: Iguania
- Family: Chamaeleonidae
- Genus: Kinyongia
- Species: K. itombwensis

Binomial name
- Kinyongia itombwensis Hughes et al., 2017

Species of lizard

Kinyongia itombwensis is a species of chameleons endemic to the eastern Democratic Republic of the Congo. Its common name is Itombwe forest chameleon.
