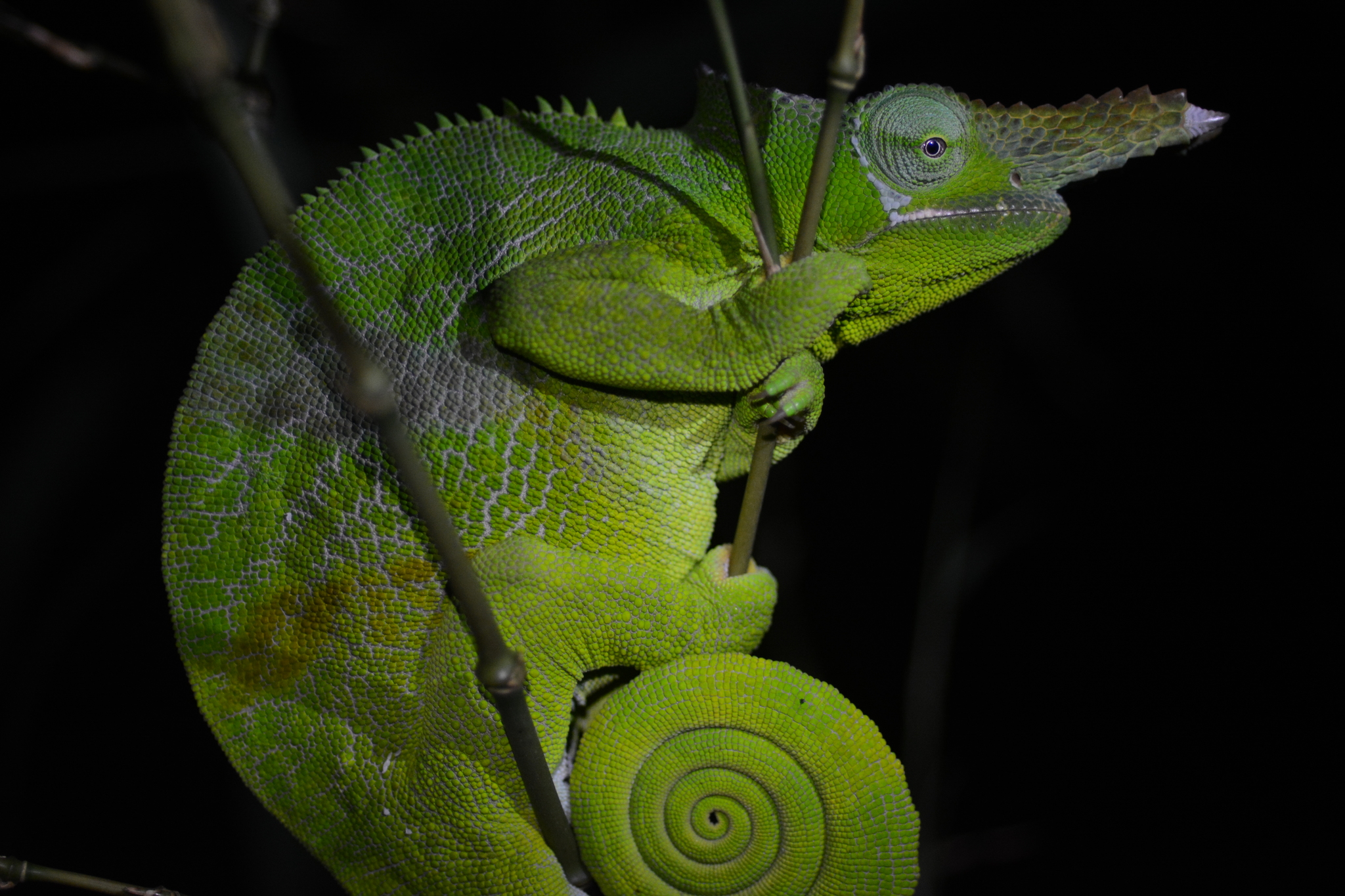

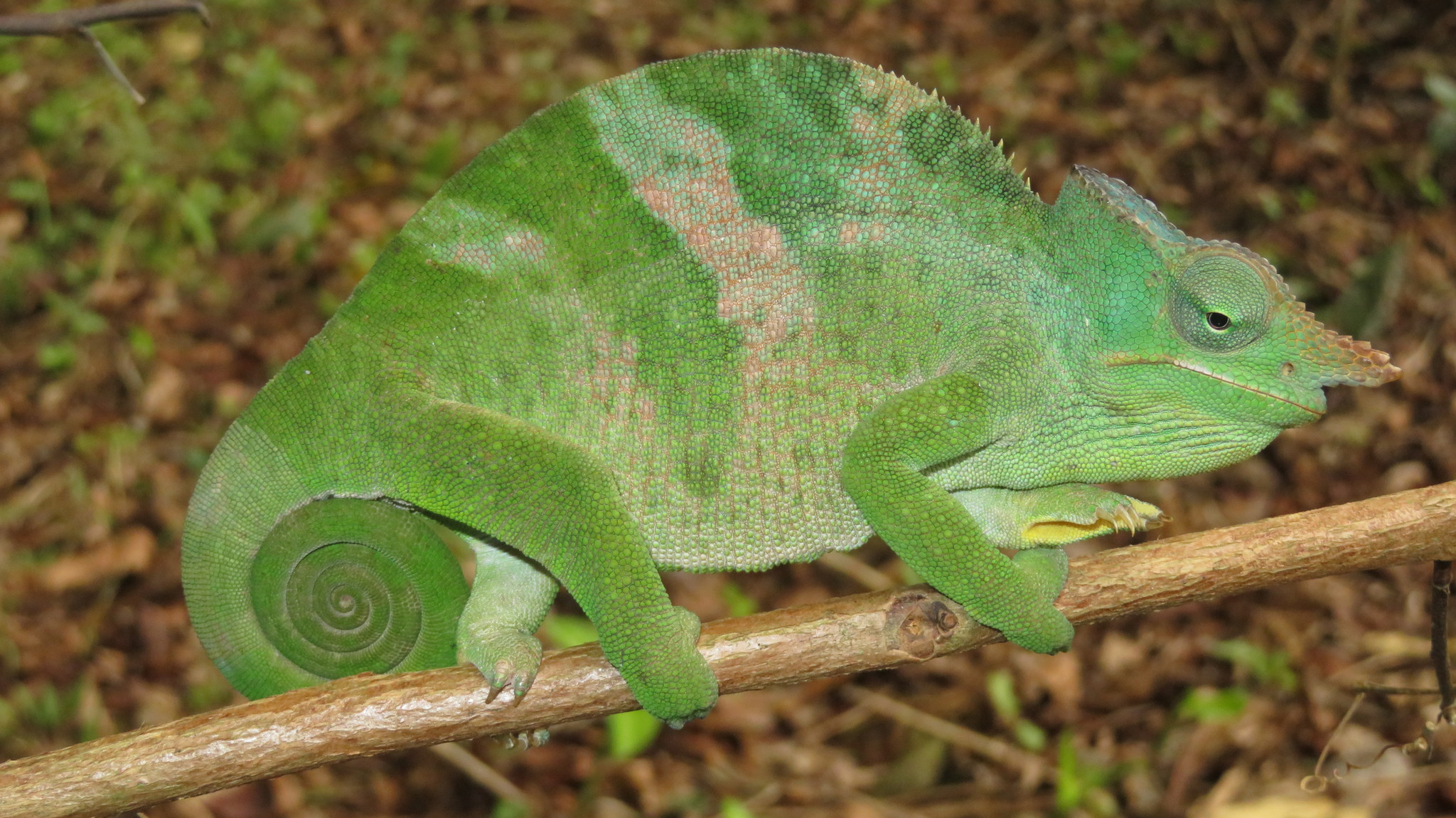
- Male above, female below

Conservation status
- Endangered (IUCN 3.1)

Scientific classification
- Kingdom: Animalia
- Phylum: Chordata
- Class: Reptilia
- Order: Squamata
- Suborder: Iguania
- Family: Chamaeleonidae
- Genus: Kinyongia
- Species: K. matschiei

Binomial name
- Kinyongia matschiei (Werner, 1895)
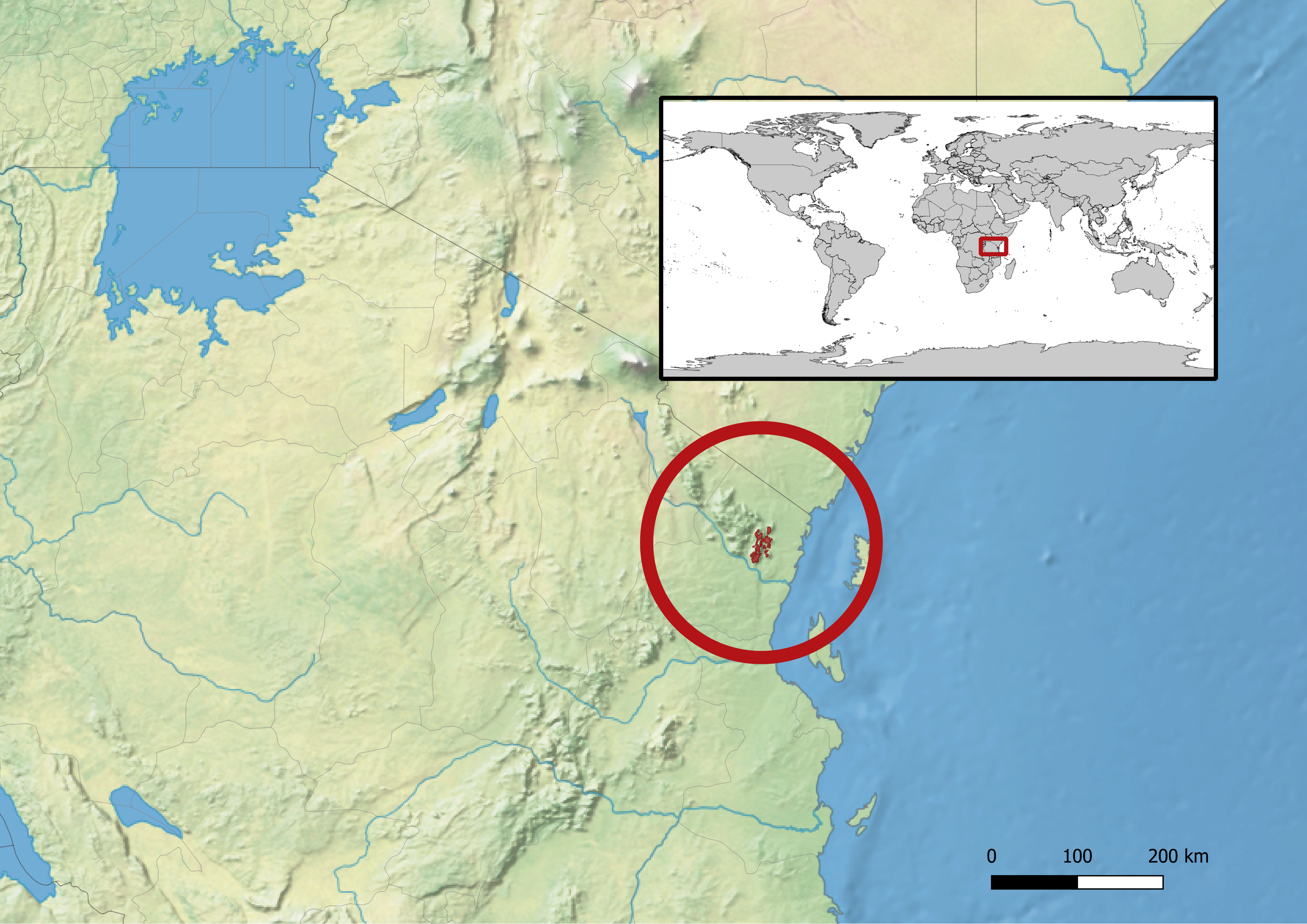

Synonyms
- Chamaeleon matschiei Werner, 1895; Chamaeleon fischeri matschiei Werner, 1895

= Kinyongia matschiei =

Species of lizard

Kinyongia matschiei, common name giant monkey-tailed east Usambara two-horned chameleon, giant east Usambara blade-horned chameleon, and Matschie's two-horned chameleon, is a species of chameleon from the East Usambara Mountains in Tanzania. It was formerly confused with K. fischeri, which is not found in the range of K. matschiei.

K. matschiei is the largest species in the genus Kinyongia at up to 41.3 cm (16.3 in) in total length, although the female remains smaller than the male at up to 36.0 cm (14.2 in). The adult male has a long pair of "horns" on the nose, which can be parallel or divergent; they are much smaller in the female.

== Distribution ==
This species lives only at altitudes of up to 1,500 m (4,900 ft) over a total of 800 km^{2} (310 sq mi) of isolated Afrotemperate forest areas in the East Usambara Mountains of Tanzania. The actual area of occupancy, however, is under 300 km^{2} (120 sq mi). Its numbers are declining. Although sometimes found in degraded habitats near forest, it is not found in fully transformed areas such as plantations. The related K. vosseleri occurs in the same range as K. matschiei, while K. multituberculata is found in the West Usambaras.
