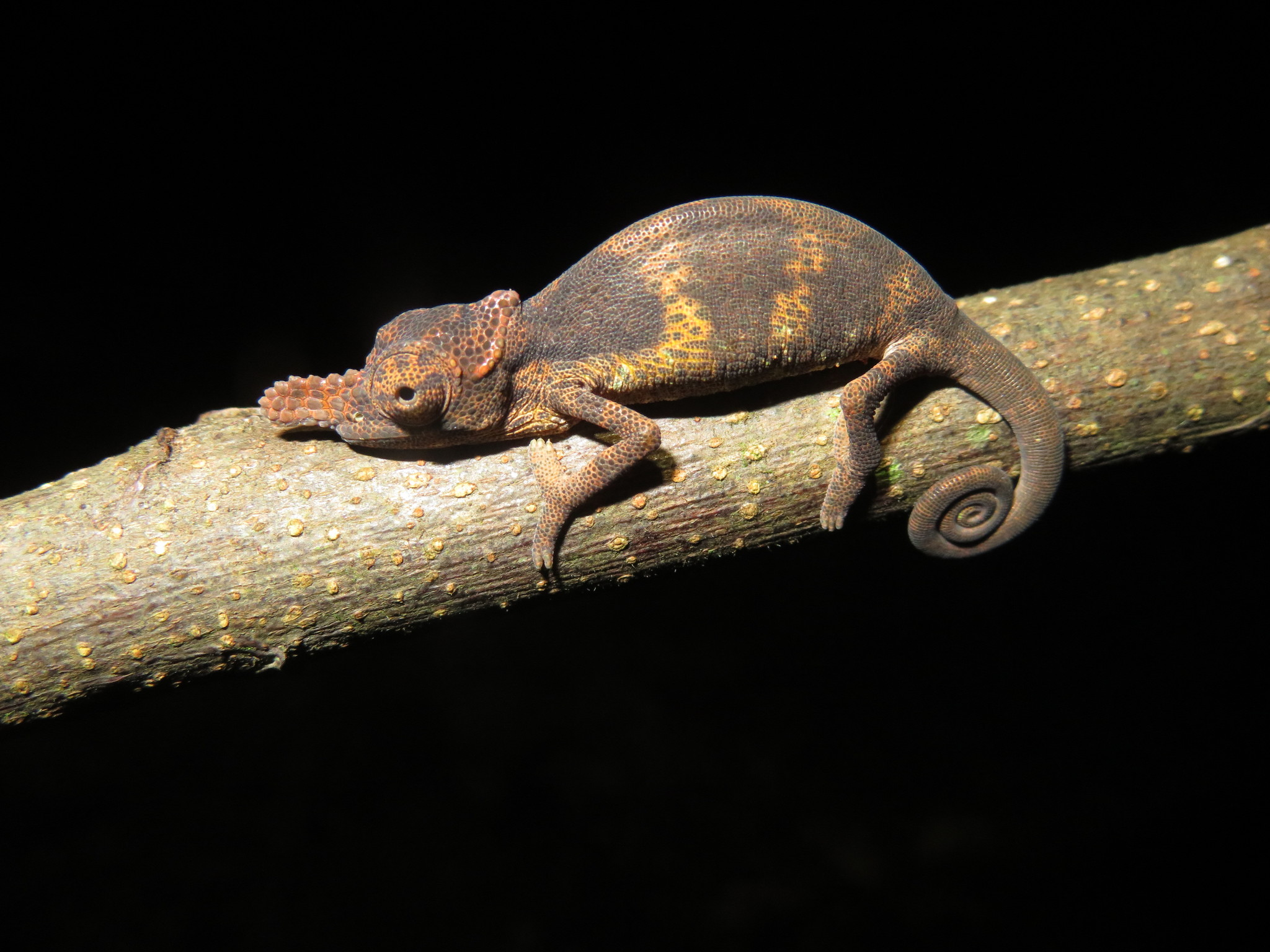

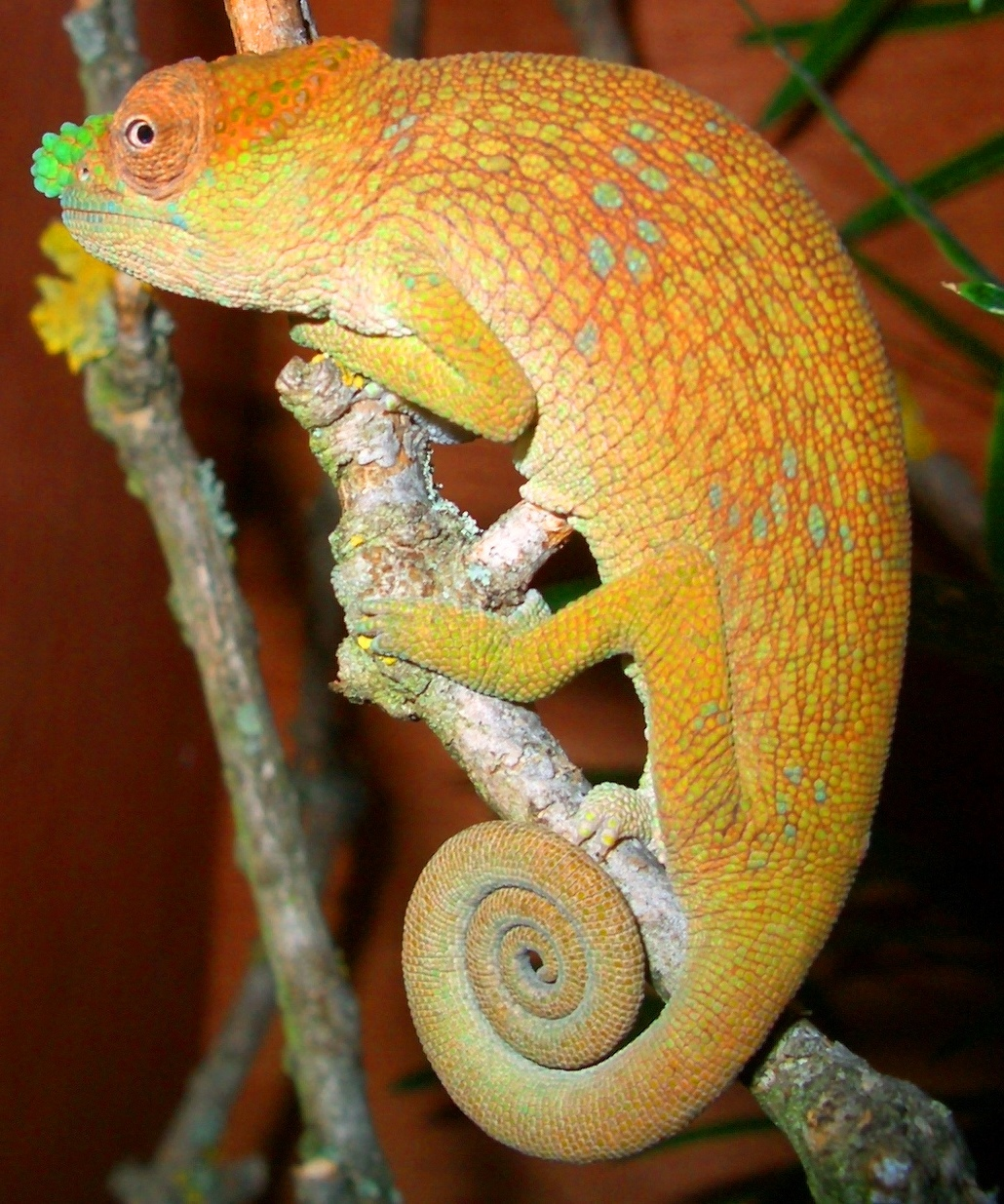
- Male above, female below

Conservation status
- Endangered (IUCN 3.1)

Scientific classification
- Kingdom: Animalia
- Phylum: Chordata
- Class: Reptilia
- Order: Squamata
- Suborder: Iguania
- Family: Chamaeleonidae
- Genus: Kinyongia
- Species: K. tenuis

Binomial name
- Kinyongia tenuis (Matschie, 1892)
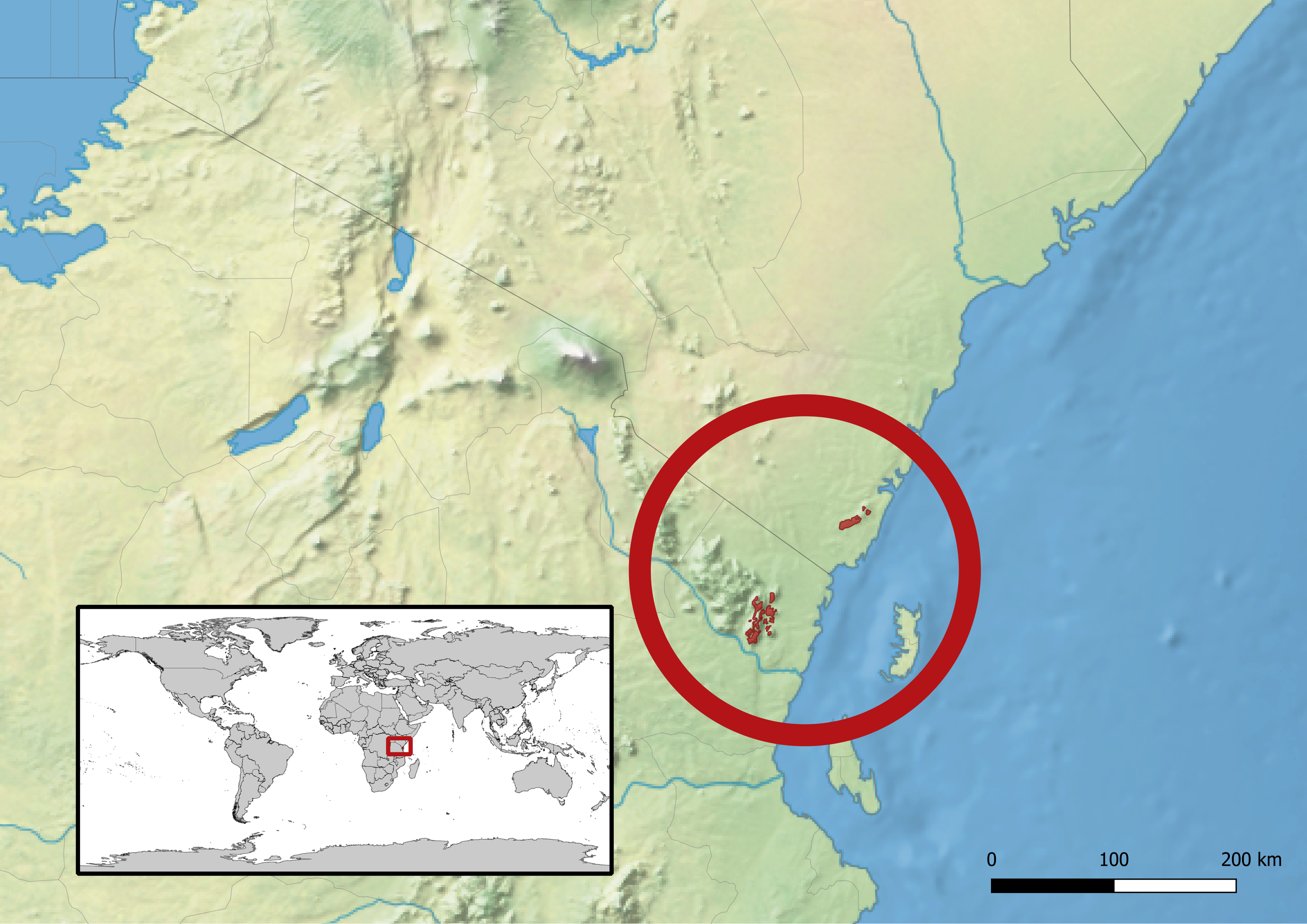

Synonyms
- Bradypodion tenue (Matschie, 1892); Bradypodion tenue – Lantermann & Lantermann, 2009; Chamaeleon tenuis Matschie, 1892; Kinyongia tenuis – Schmidt et al., 2010; Kinyongia tenuis – Tilbury et al, 2006

= Kinyongia tenuis =

Species of lizard

Kinyongia tenuis, also known as the Usambara soft-horned chameleon, Usambara flap-nosed chameleon and Matschie's dwarf chameleon, is a fairly small species of chameleon from Kenya and Tanzania.

== Distribution and taxonomy ==
This species has been recorded in Tanzania's Afrotemperate forests in east Usambara Mountains and Magrotto Hill. In Kenya, it is only known as a subpopulation in the Shimba Hills. The populations in the two countries are clearly separated and it remains to be verified if they belong to a single species or two separate species.
