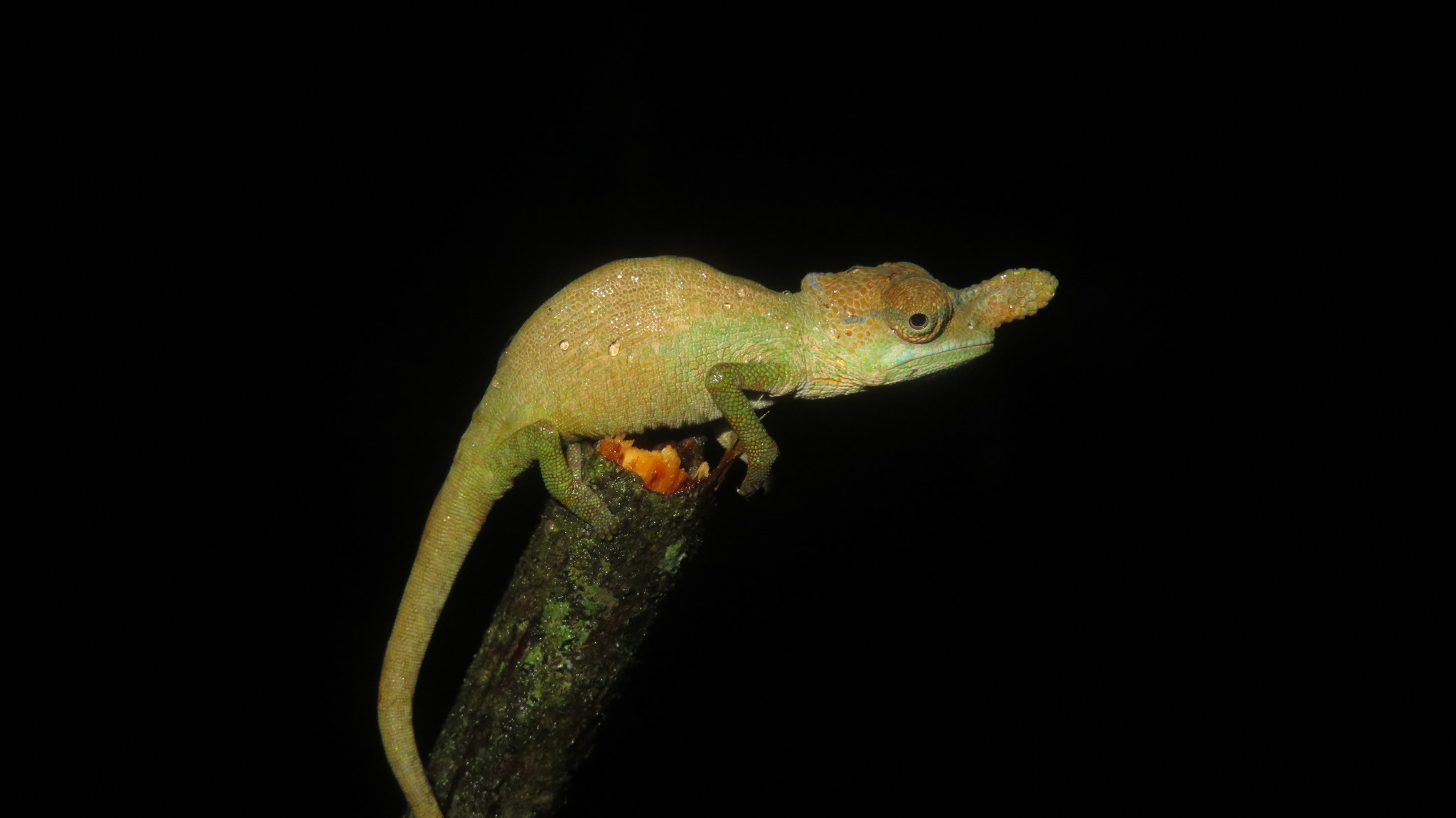

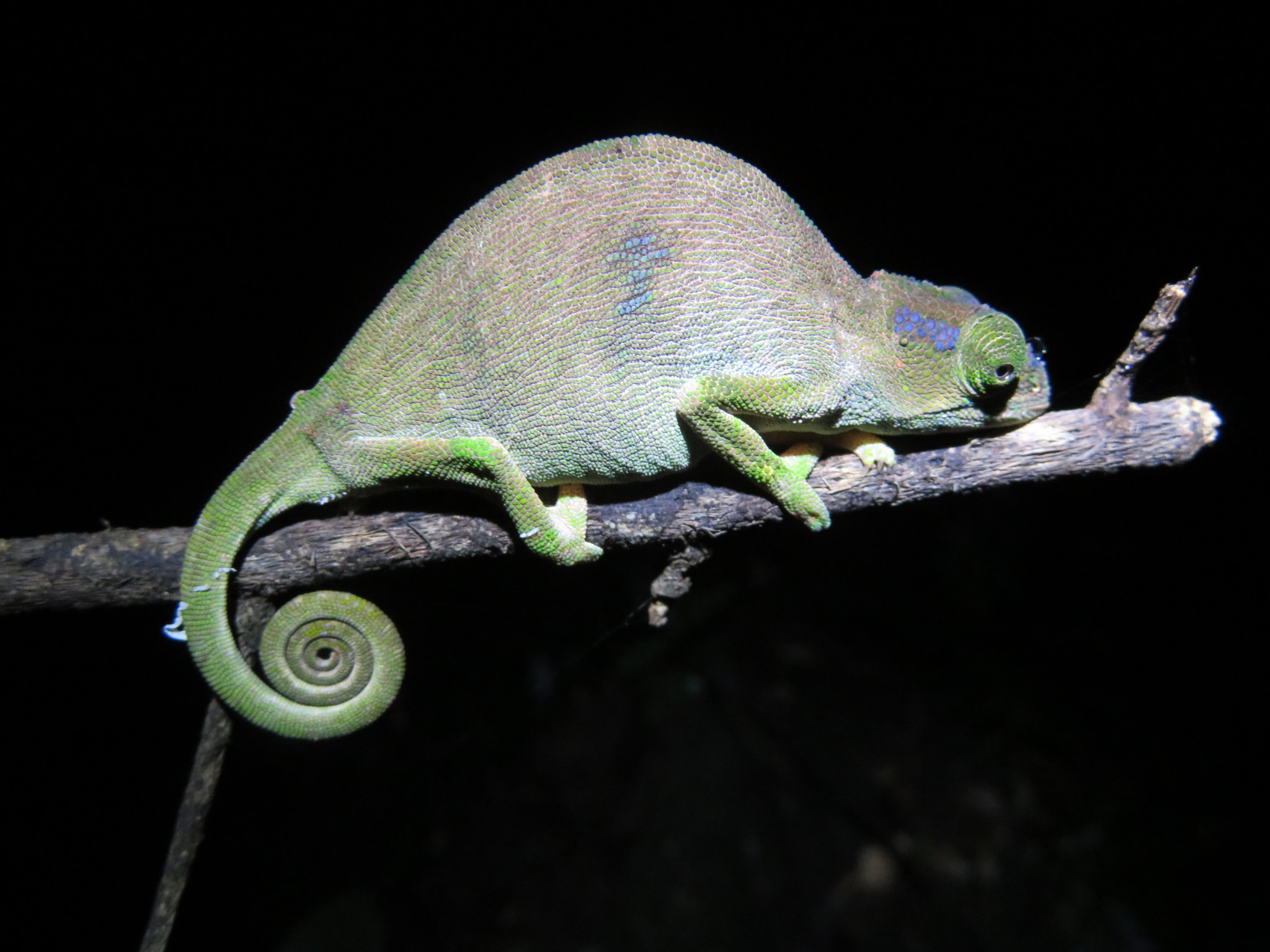
- male above, female below

Conservation status
- Near Threatened (IUCN 3.1)

Scientific classification
- Kingdom: Animalia
- Phylum: Chordata
- Class: Reptilia
- Order: Squamata
- Suborder: Iguania
- Family: Chamaeleonidae
- Genus: Kinyongia
- Species: K. oxyrhina

Binomial name
- Kinyongia oxyrhina (Klaver & Böhme, 1988)
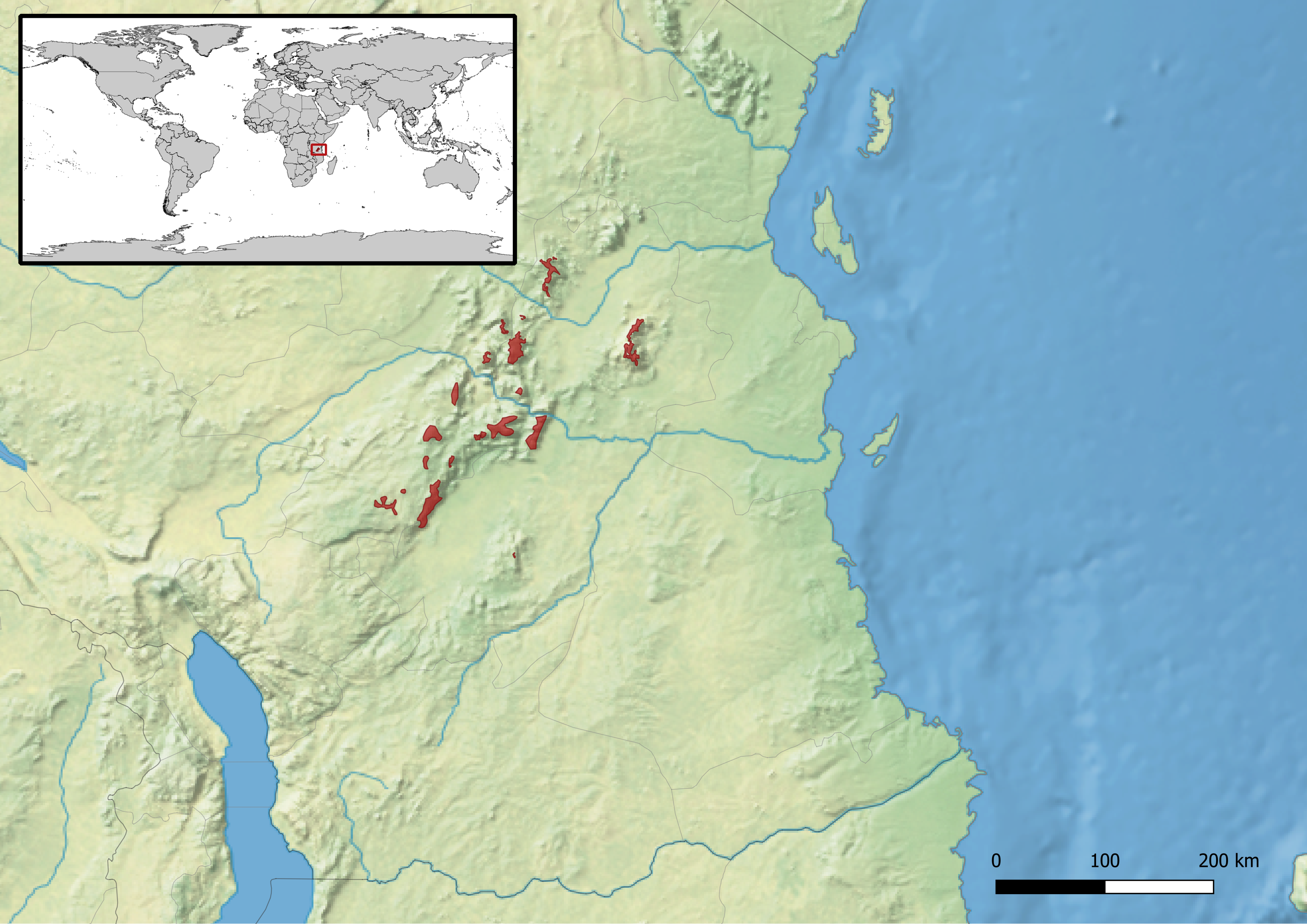

Synonyms
- Kinyongia oxyrhinum Bradypodion oxyrhinum Chamaeleo oxyrhinum

= Sharp-nosed chameleon =

Species of lizard

The sharp-nosed chameleon (Kinyongia oxyrhina) is a chameleon native to the Uluguru and Udzungwa Mountains of Tanzania, where it inhabits forests (also secondary), woodlands and plantations at an altitude of 1,400–1,900 m (4,600–6,200 ft) above sea level.

It reached up to c. 15 cm (6 in) in total length, with about half being the tail. Adult males have a distinct soft and blade-like horn on the nose where the tip is movable; females lack a horn. Its colours are very variable, but typically shades of brown, grey, green or rusty-red, and especially during the mating season may have some blue patches.

The sharp-nosed chameleon was scientifically described in 1988.
