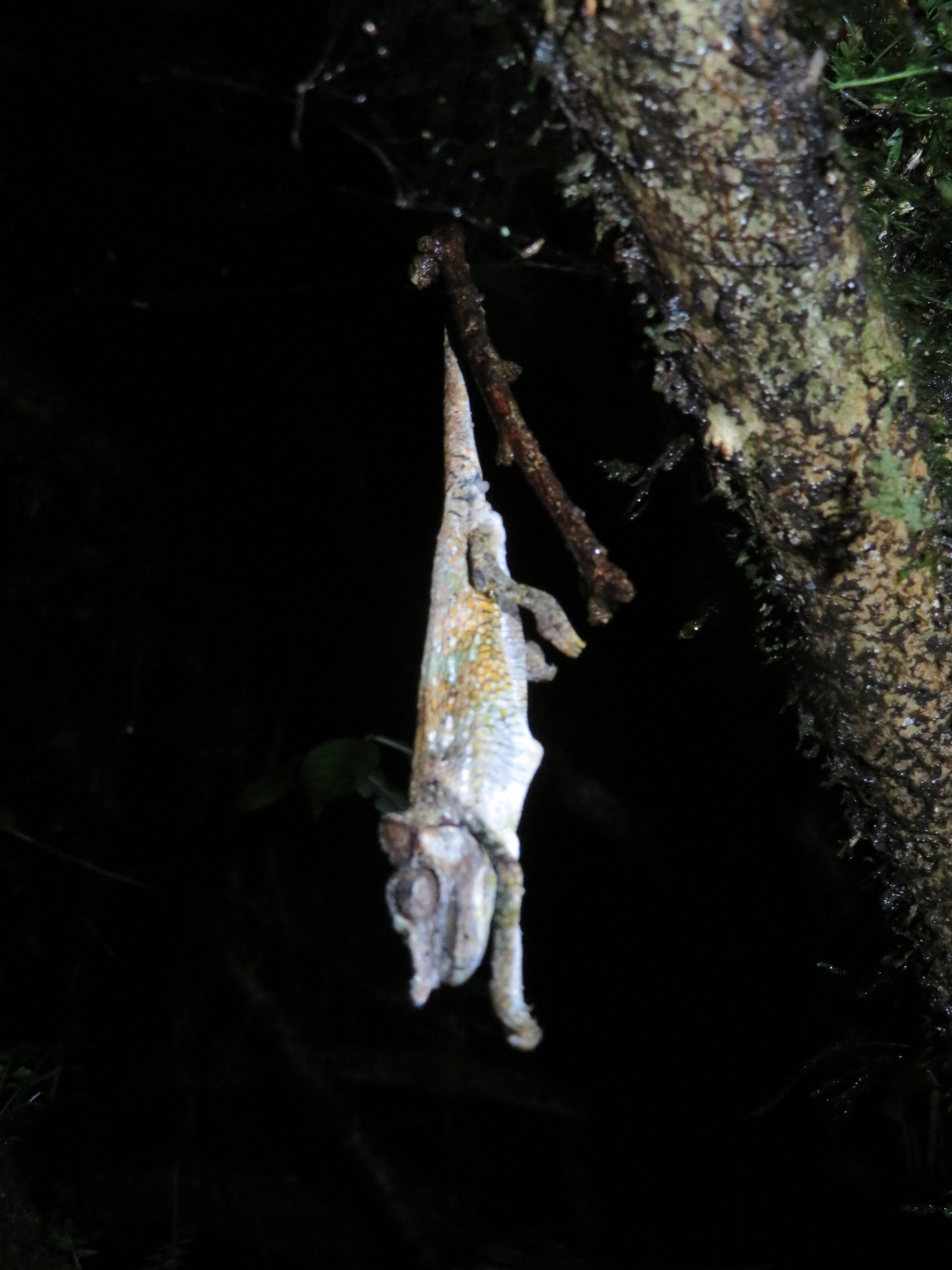
- male

Scientific classification
- Kingdom: Animalia
- Phylum: Chordata
- Class: Reptilia
- Order: Squamata
- Suborder: Iguania
- Family: Chamaeleonidae
- Genus: Kinyongia
- Species: K. msuyae

Binomial name
- Kinyongia msuyae Menegon et al., 2015

= Kinyongia msuyae =

Species of lizard

Kinyongia msuyae is a species of chameleons endemic to the Udzungwa Mountain region in Tanzania.

== Etymology ==
The species is named for Charles A. Msuya, a pioneering Tanzanian herpetologist who collected the first specimen attributable to the species.
