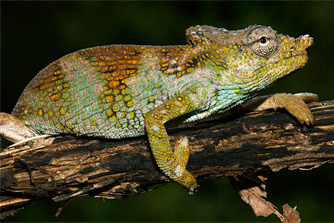

Conservation status
- Least Concern (IUCN 3.1)

Scientific classification
- Kingdom: Animalia
- Phylum: Chordata
- Class: Reptilia
- Order: Squamata
- Suborder: Iguania
- Family: Chamaeleonidae
- Genus: Kinyongia
- Species: K. vanheygeni

Binomial name
- Kinyongia vanheygeni Nečas, 2009
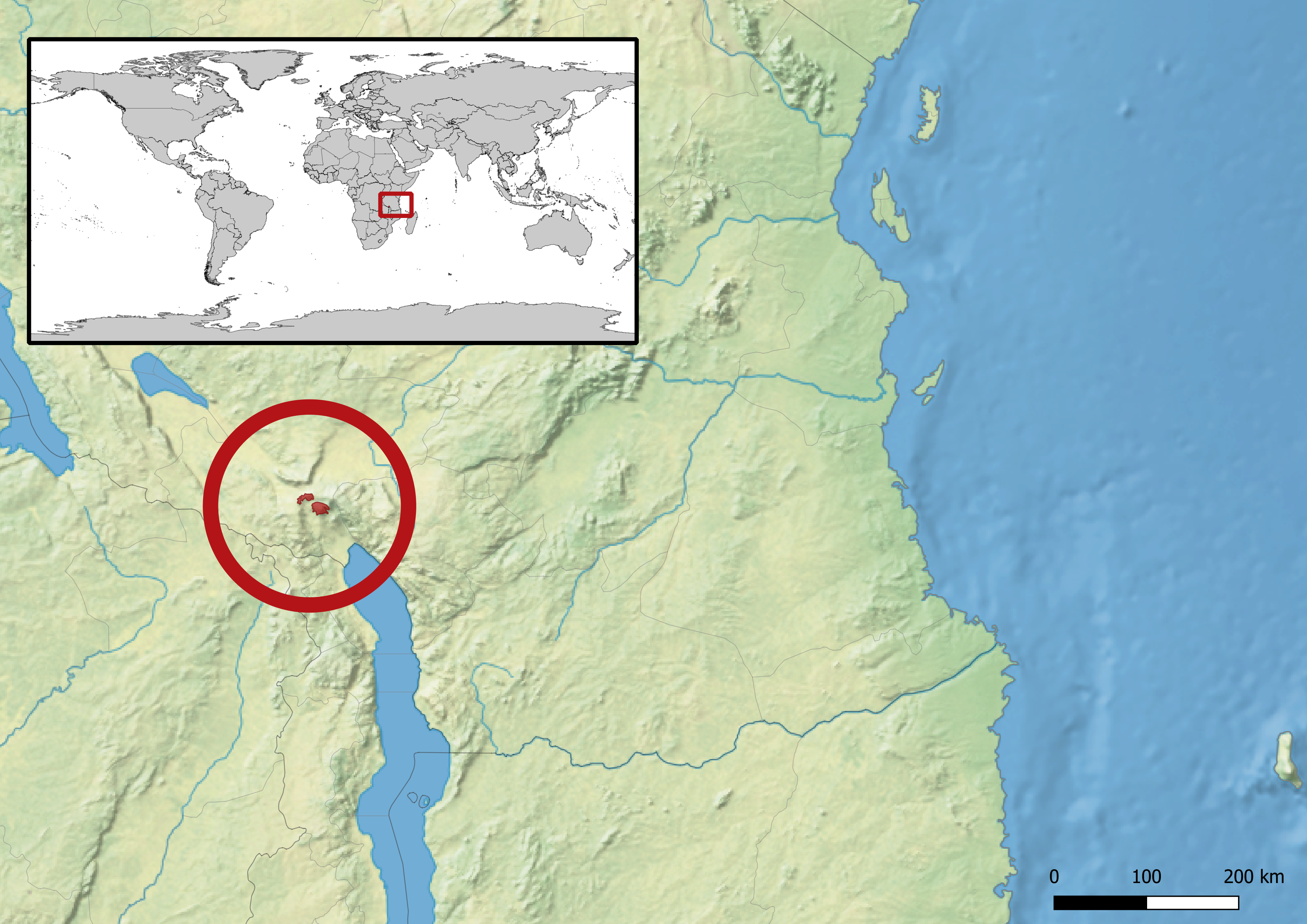

= Kinyongia vanheygeni =

Species of lizard

Kinyongia vanheygeni, the Poroto single-horned chameleon or Van Heygen's chameleon, is a species of chameleon, a lizard in the family Chamaeleonidae.

== Geographic range ==
Kinyongia vanheygeni is native to highland forests in the Rungwe and Poroto Mountains of southern Tanzania and northern Malawi.

== Etymology ==
Kinyongia vanheygeni was named after Belgian herpetologist Emmanuel Van Heygen, who took the first pictures of it in the wild.
