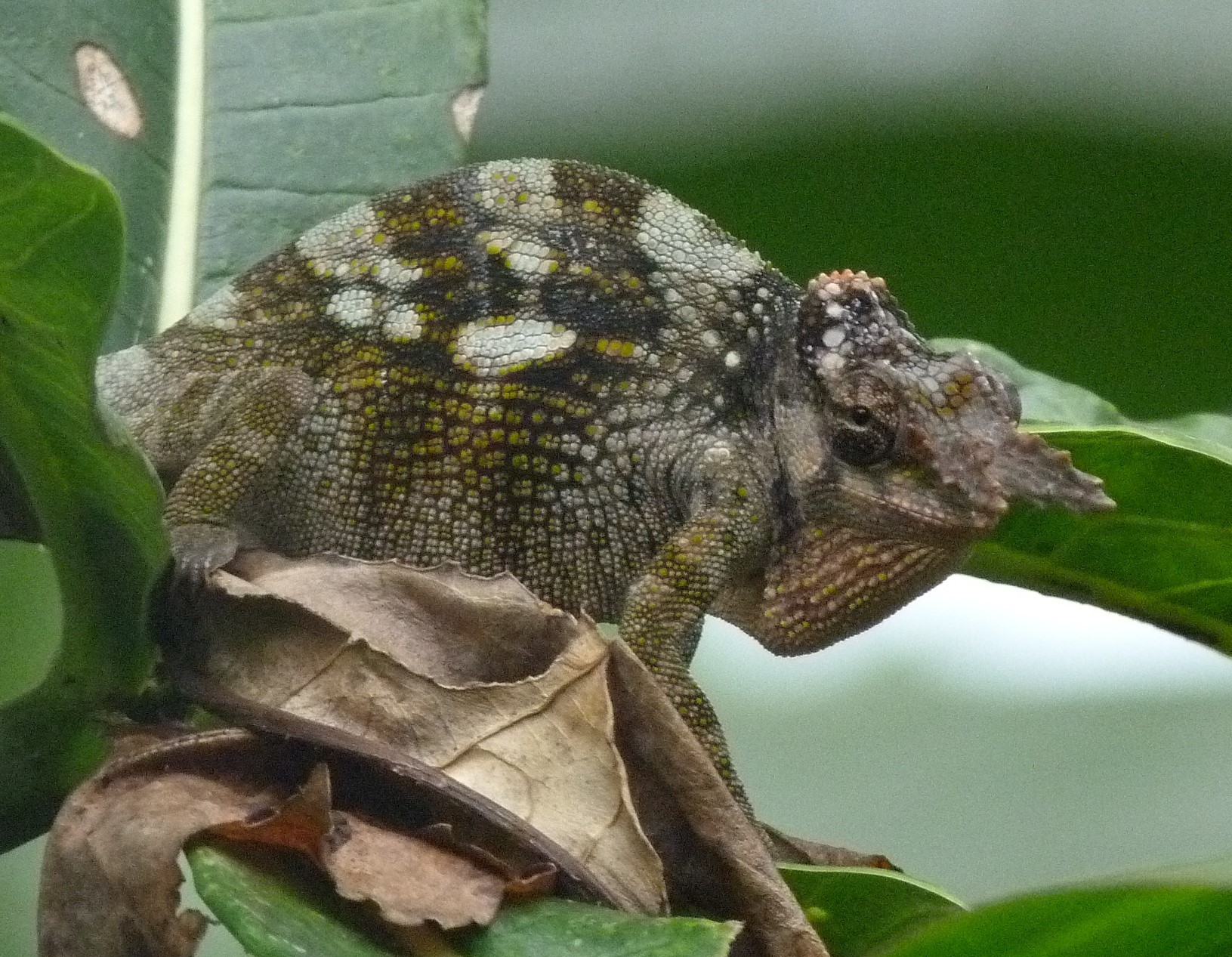

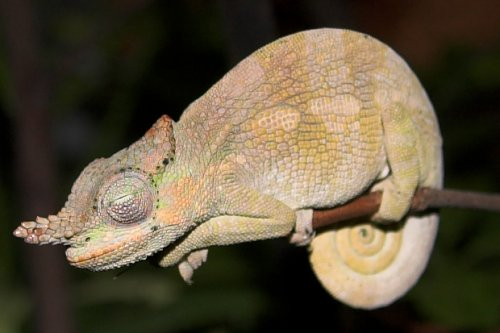
- Males (above active, below sleeping)

Conservation status
- Near Threatened (IUCN 3.1)

Scientific classification
- Kingdom: Animalia
- Phylum: Chordata
- Class: Reptilia
- Order: Squamata
- Suborder: Iguania
- Family: Chamaeleonidae
- Genus: Kinyongia
- Species: K. tavetana

Binomial name
- Kinyongia tavetana (Steindachner, 1891)
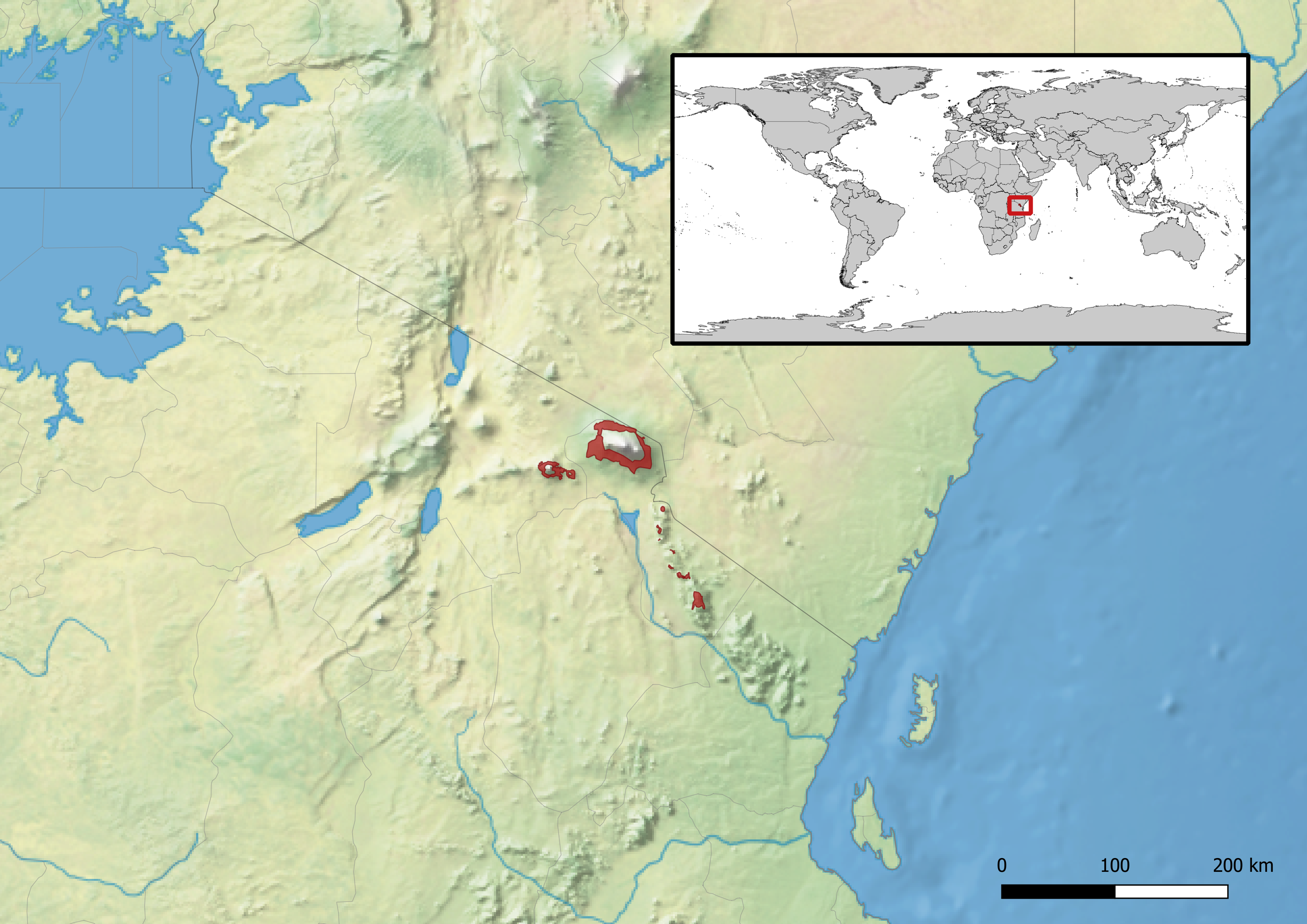

Synonyms
- Bradypodion tavetanum (Steindachner, 1891); Kinyongia tavetanum (Steindachner, 1891)

= Kinyongia tavetana =

Species of lizard

Kinyongia tavetana, the Kilimanjaro two-horned chameleon or Kilimanjaro blade-horned chameleon, is a species of chameleon in the genus Kinyongia. It is native to forests, woodlands, well-wooded gardens and plantations in the highlands of southern Kenya and northern Tanzania. Its type locality is Mount Kilimanjaro, but it is also known from Chyulu Hills and Mount Meru to the Pare Mountains.

== Taxonomy ==
Until 1991 when they were split, K. tavetana was generally considered a subpopulation or subspecies of K. fischeri.

In 2002, the subpopulation from Taita Hills in Kenya was described as a new subspecies, K. tavetana boehmei, but in 2008 it was recommended that it instead should be recognized as a separate species, K. boehmei.

== Appearance ==
The species' reached up to c. 24 cm (9 in) in total length, with males growing larger than females. It varies in colour and pattern, partially depending on location and sex, but is generally various shades of brown, grey, green, yellow, red or blue. The adult male has a pair of diverging, blade-like "horns" on the nose, which are lacking in females.
