= Kinyongia carpenteri =

Conservation status
- Near Threatened (IUCN 3.1)

Scientific classification
- Kingdom: Animalia
- Phylum: Chordata
- Class: Reptilia
- Order: Squamata
- Suborder: Iguania
- Family: Chamaeleonidae
- Genus: Kinyongia
- Species: K. carpenteri

Binomial name
- Kinyongia carpenteri (Parker, 1929)

Synonyms
- Chamaeleo carpenteri Parker, 1929; Bradypodion carpenteri — Nečas, 1999; Kinyongia carpenteri — Tilbury, Tolley & Branch, 2006

Species of lizard

Kinyongia carpenteri, commonly called Carpenter's chameleon or the helmeted chameleon, is a species of chameleon, a lizard in the family Chamaeleonidae. The species is native to central Africa.

== Geographic range ==
K. carpenteri has a geographic range limited to the mountain highlands on the border between Uganda and the Democratic Republic of the Congo.

== Habitat ==
The preferred natural habitat of K. carpenteri is forest, at altitudes of 1,700–2,300 m (5,600–7,500 ft).

== Reproduction ==
K. carpenteri is oviparous.

== Etymology ==
The specific name, carpenteri, honors the type specimen's collector, British physician and entomologist Geoffrey Douglas Hale Carpenter.

== Taxonomy ==
Originally named in the genus Chamaeleo, the species C. carpenteri was moved into the genus Bradypodion prior to its current classification. With the move into the genus Kinyongia, the masculine ending to the specific epithets of other species in the genus needed to be modified to match the feminine generic name.
