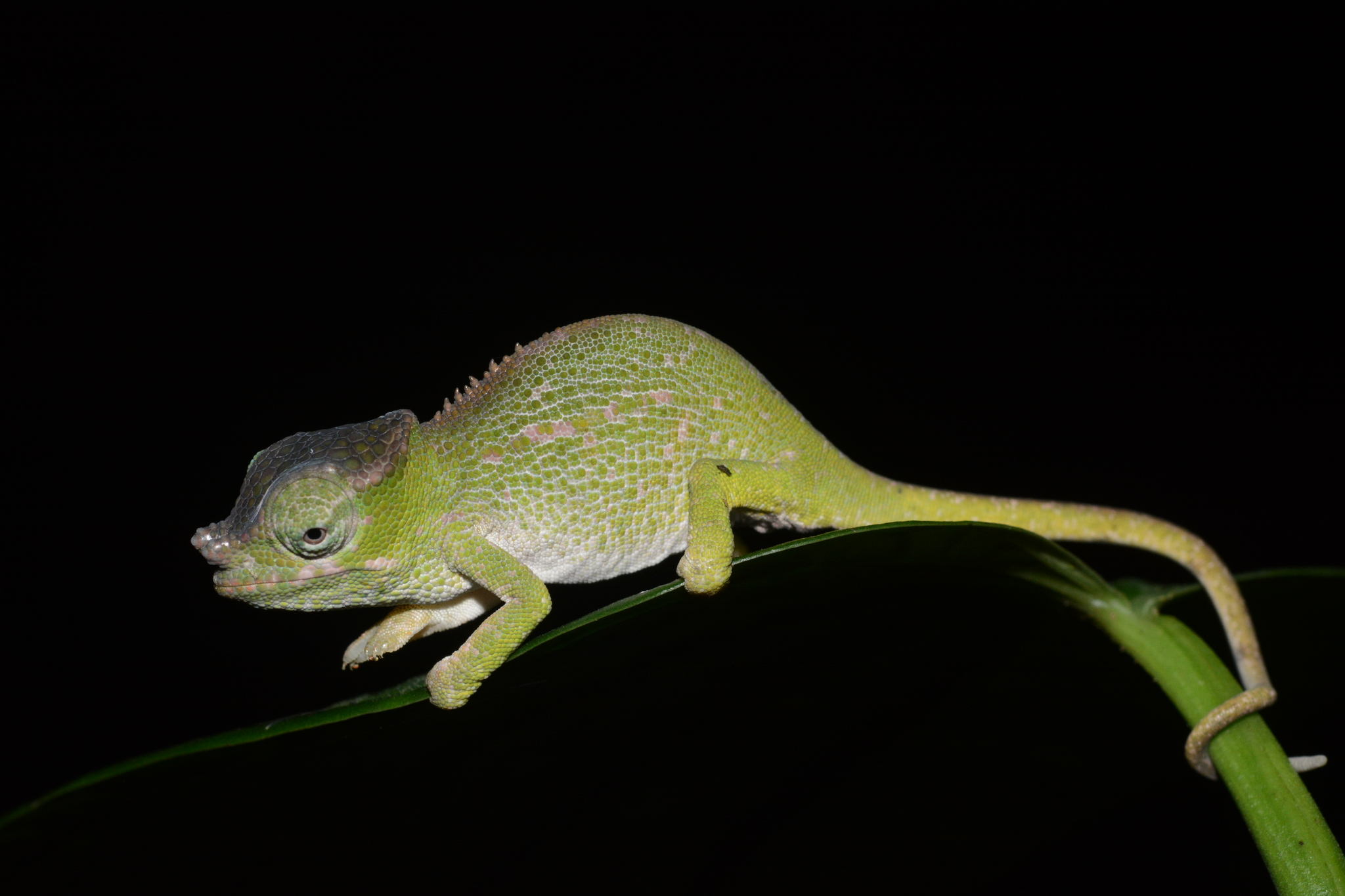
- Juvenile

Conservation status
- Least Concern (IUCN 3.1)

Scientific classification
- Domain: Eukaryota
- Kingdom: Animalia
- Phylum: Chordata
- Class: Reptilia
- Order: Squamata
- Suborder: Iguania
- Family: Chamaeleonidae
- Genus: Kinyongia
- Species: K. uluguruensis

Binomial name
- Kinyongia uluguruensis (Loveridge, 1957)
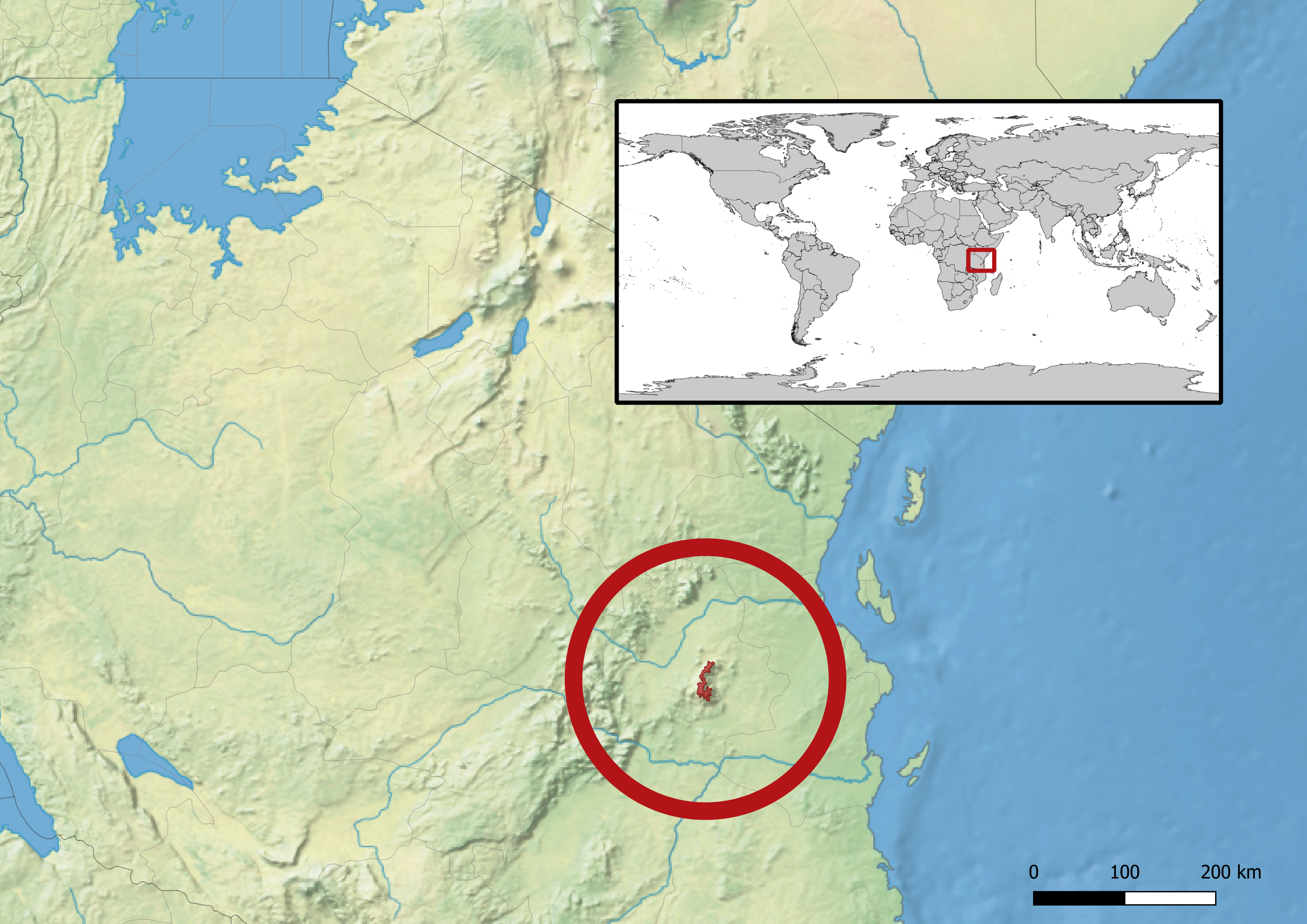

Synonyms
- Chamaeleo fischeri subsp. uluguruensis (Loveridge, 1957)

= Kinyongia uluguruensis =

Species of lizard

Kinyongia uluguruensis is a species of chameleon, also known as the Uluguru two-horned chameleon or Uluguru two-horned chamaeleon. It is endemic to highland forests in the Uluguru Mountains of Tanzania.
