= Kinyongia adolfifriderici =

Conservation status
- Least Concern (IUCN 3.1)

Scientific classification
- Kingdom: Animalia
- Phylum: Chordata
- Class: Reptilia
- Order: Squamata
- Suborder: Iguania
- Family: Chamaeleonidae
- Genus: Kinyongia
- Species: K. adolfifriderici

Binomial name
- Kinyongia adolfifriderici (Sternfeld, 1912)

Synonyms
- Chamaeleon adolfi-friderici Sternfeld, 1912; Chameleo [sic] adolfi-friderici — Hillenius, 1963; Chameleo adolfifriderici [sic] — Mertens, 1966; Bradypodion adolfifriderici — Klaver & Böhme, 1986; Kinyongia adolfifriderici — Tilbury, Tolley & Branch, 2006

Species of lizard

Kinyongia adolfifriderici is a species of chameleon, a lizard in the family Chamaeleonidae. The species is native to central Africa and east Africa.

== Geographic range ==
K. adolfifriderici is found in Burundi, northern and eastern Democratic Republic of the Congo, Rwanda, and Uganda.

== Common names ==
Common names for K. adolfifriderici include the Ituri dwarf chameleon and the Ituri chameleon.

== Etymology ==
The specific name adolfifriderici honours Duke Adolf Friedrich of Mecklenburg, leader of the German Central Africa Expedition in 1907–1908, during which the types were collected.

== Habitat ==
The preferred natural habitat of K. adolfifriderici is forest, at altitudes of 1,000–2,200 m (3,300–7,200 ft).

== Reproduction ==
K. adolfifriderici is oviparous.
