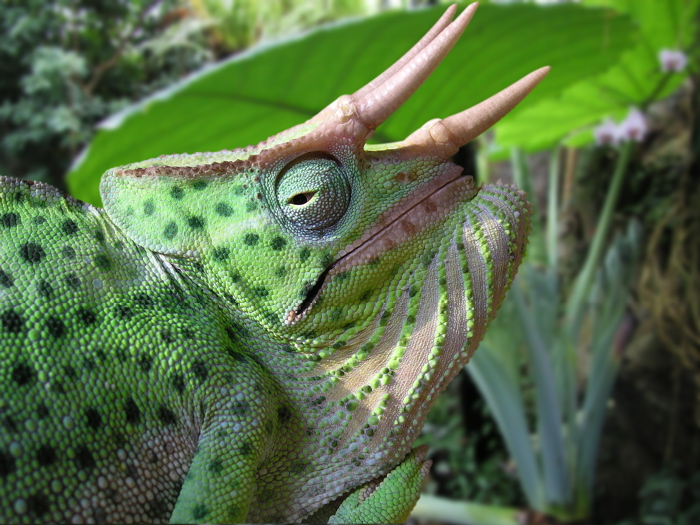

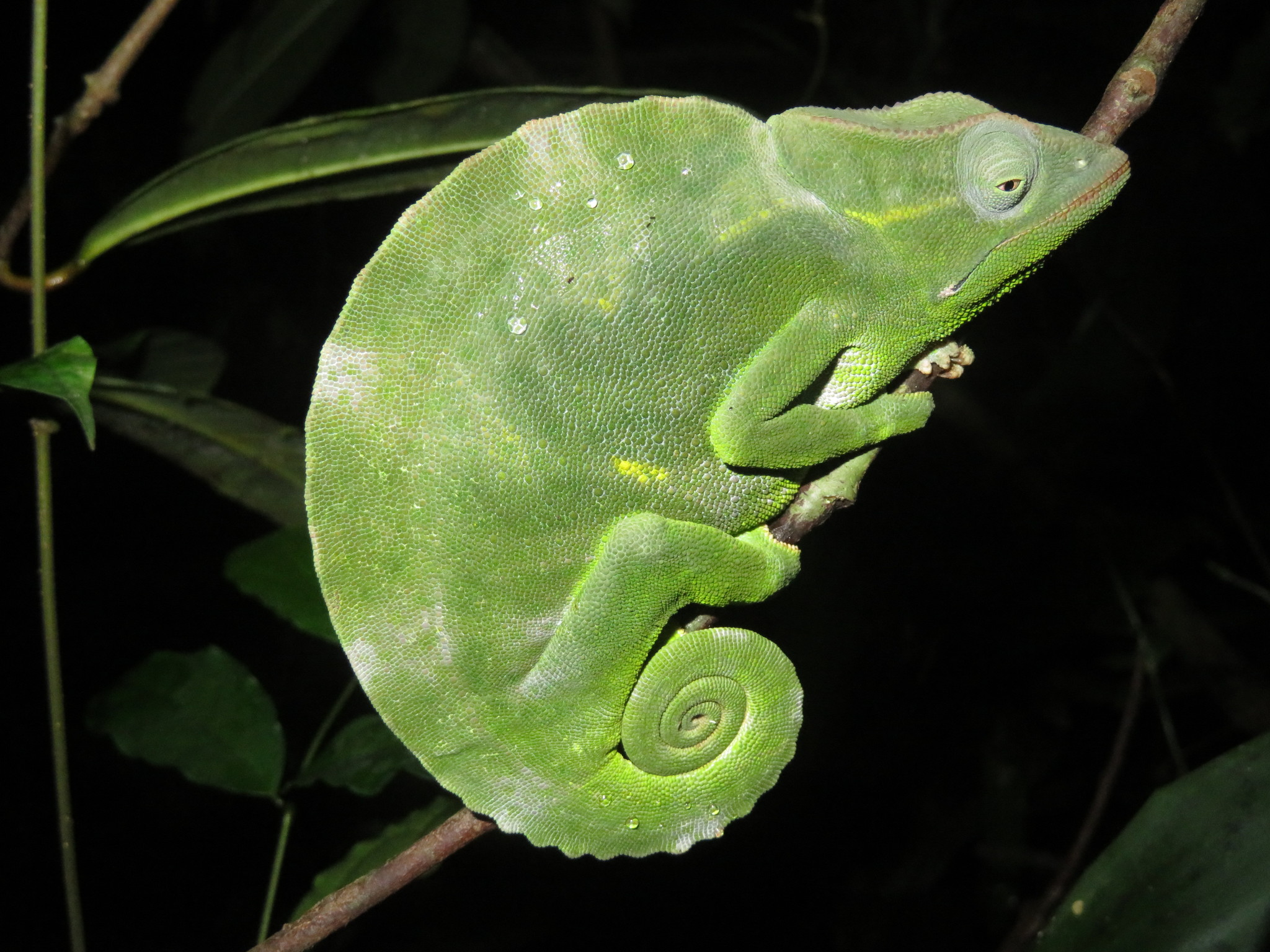
- male above, female below

Conservation status
- Least Concern (IUCN 3.1)

Scientific classification
- Kingdom: Animalia
- Phylum: Chordata
- Class: Reptilia
- Order: Squamata
- Suborder: Iguania
- Family: Chamaeleonidae
- Genus: Trioceros
- Species: T. deremensis

Binomial name
- Trioceros deremensis (Matschie, 1892)

Synonyms
- Chamaeleo deremensis (Matschie, 1892); Chamaeleon deremensis Matschie, 1892

= Trioceros deremensis =

Species of lizard

Trioceros deremensis, the Usambara three-horned chameleon or wavy chameleon, is a species of chameleon that is endemic to forests in the Eastern Arc Mountains of Tanzania.

== Distribution ==
The Usambara three-horned chameleon is found at an altitude of 800–2,300 m (2,600–7,500 ft) in the East Usambara (there is a single old record from West Usambara but it is doubtful the species occurs there), Uluguru, Nguu, Nguru, and Udzungwa Mountains, with its range covering about 1,400 km^{2} (540 sq mi). Each subpopulation is isolated and the species mostly occurs in forests (both the interior and at edges), but also in nearby hedges and plantations.

== Description ==
The Usambara three-horned chameleon has a sail-like ridge on the back and can reach up to 35 cm (14 in) in total length. Males grow larger than females. The male has three long horns, which presumably are used in fights between males (like in other horned chameleons). The horns first start to appear when still a juvenile at 10–12 cm (4–5 in) long. Females do not have horns.

It is typically green overall, often with a paler or darker pattern, and may also show some yellow. If irritated, it has black spots that can become quite prominent. It is an oviparous species with each clutch consisting of 8–40 eggs. When just hatched, the young, which also can be purplish-whitish in colour, are only 5–7 cm (2–3 in) long.

== Conservation ==
The Usambara three-horned chameleon is generally common in its range and listed as Least Concern (not threatened) by the IUCN. It has a restricted distribution, but much of it is within reasonably well-protected reserves.

Like all chameleons, the Usambara three-horned chameleon is listed on CITES, which means that legal international trade requires a permit. Between 1992 and 2011 a total of 8,437 live individuals were exported from Tanzania for the pet trade, 622 of which were not captured from the wild, but bred or born in captivity. After 2017, Tanzania has not allowed exports of the Usambara three-horned chameleon.
