= T. darwini =

T. darwini may refer to:

- Tanaoneura darwini, a species of parasitic wasp
- Tarentola darwini, the Darwin's wall gecko, a lizard species in the genus Tarentola
- Thecacera darwini, a sea slug species in the genus Thecacera
- Toxodon darwini, an extinct mammal species of the late Pliocene and Pleistocene epochs
- Trichoniscus darwini, Vandel, 1938, a woodlouse species in the genus Trichoniscus

== See also ==
- T. darwinii (disambiguation)
- Darwini (disambiguation)
