= South American marked gecko =

There are two species of gecko named South American marked gecko:

- Homonota horrida
- Homonota fasciata
