= R. darwini =

R. darwini may refer to:

- Risius darwini
- Ropalidia darwini

== See also ==
- R. darwinii (disambiguation)
- Darwini (disambiguation)
