= Thecacera sesama =

Scientific classification
- Kingdom: Animalia
- Phylum: Mollusca
- Class: Gastropoda
- Order: Nudibranchia
- Family: Polyceridae
- Genus: Thecacera
- Species: T. sesama

Binomial name
- Thecacera sesama Chan & Lee et al. 2026

Species of nudibranch

Thecacera sesama is a species of nudibranch sea slug belonging to the family Polyceridae. It is native to northeastern Taiwan. Thecacera sesama is a specialized predator of bryozoans based on recording of this species before collection. Phylogenetic analysis of Thecacera sesama show that it is most closely related to Thecacera picta.

== Description ==
It is a small species compared to other members of the same genera growing average length of 2.34 mm and to a maximum length of 2.83 mm. The body has a translucent whitish color which allows for some of its internal organs to be faintly visible. The entire body including its rhinophores, rhinophoral sheaths, gills, post-branchial appendages, propodial tentacles, and tail are covered by numerous circular spots. These spots are small and discrete being black in color. Also present are larger yellow spots and many white snowflake-shaped pigment patches scattered on the body.

== Discovery ==
Specimens that would be used to describe Thecacera sesama were collected from several expeditions of Mother Rock Bay between May 2021 and June 2025. After the collection of seven specimens, they were relaxed into a solution of magnesium chloride (MgCl2) on seawater to prevent the specimens from muscular contraction. The holotype specimen of Thecacera sesama is ASIZM0001725.

=== Etymology ===
The specific name "sesama" is derived from the Latin word for sesame seed. This is in reference to what Thecacera sesama most characteristic feature, the small, rounded, seed-like spots that cover the dorsal surface of this species. These spots are similar in appearance to scattered sesame seeds.
