= T. darwinii =

T. darwinii may refer to:

- Thraupis darwinii, the blue-and-yellow tanager, a bird species
- Tiquilia darwinii, a plant species endemic to Ecuador
- Trianguloscalpellum darwinii, a species of stalked barnacle, family Scalpellidae

== See also ==
- T. darwini (disambiguation)
- Darwinii (disambiguation)
