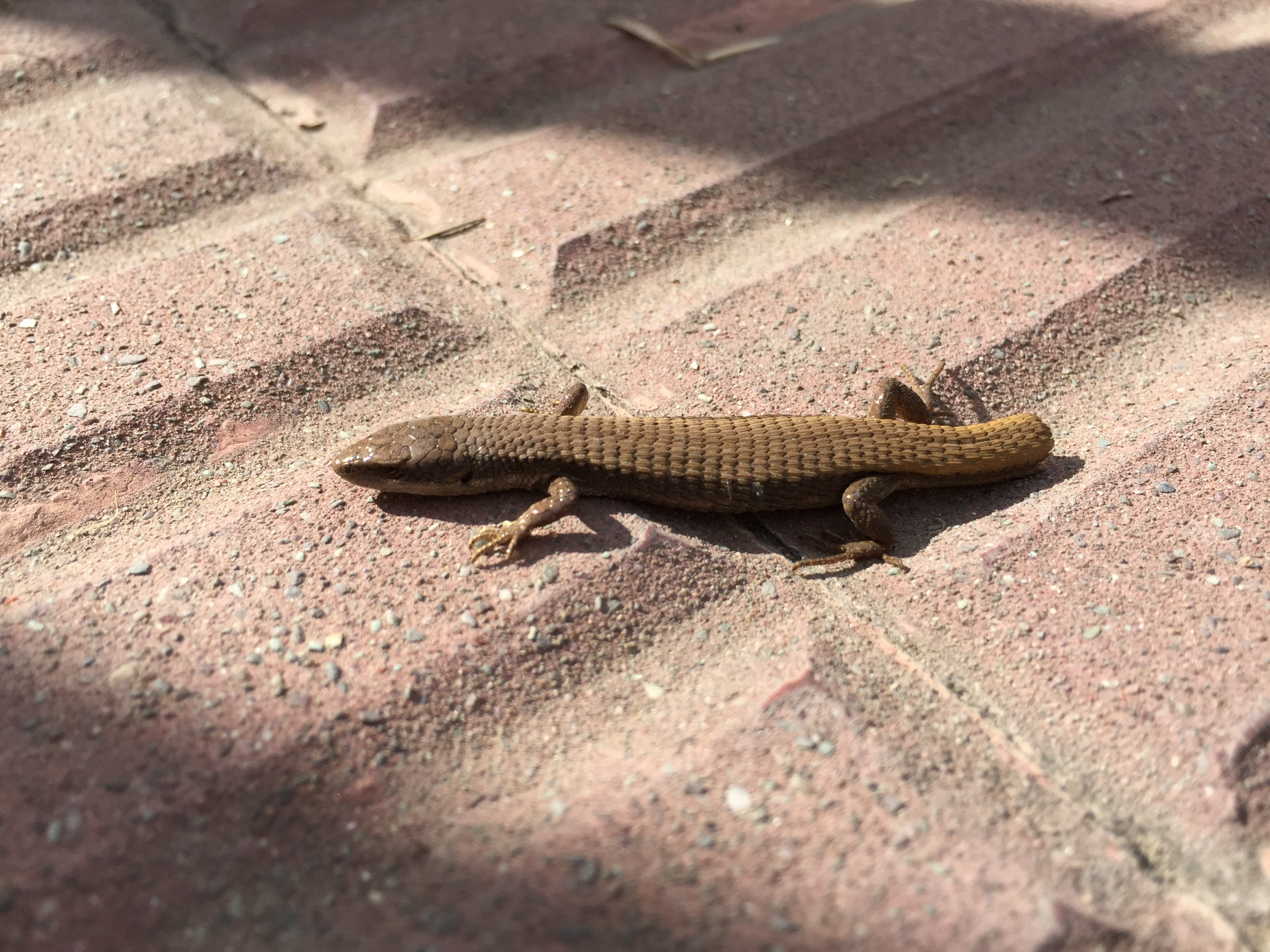
- Homonota borellii

Conservation status
- Least Concern (IUCN 3.1)

Scientific classification
- Kingdom: Animalia
- Phylum: Chordata
- Class: Reptilia
- Order: Squamata
- Suborder: Gekkota
- Family: Phyllodactylidae
- Genus: Homonota
- Species: H. borellii

Binomial name
- Homonota borellii (Peracca, 1897)

Synonyms
- Gymnodactylus borellii Peracca, 1897; Homonota borellii — Kluge, 1964

= Borelli's marked gecko =

Species of lizard

Borelli's marked gecko (Homonota borellii) is a species of gecko in the family Phyllodactylidae. The species is endemic to South America.

== Etymology ==
The specific name, borellii, is in honor of French-born Italian ornithologist Alfredo Borelli.

== Geographic range ==
H. borrellii is found in Argentina and Paraguay.

== Habitat ==
The preferred natural habitats of H. borellii are grassland, shrubland, and savanna.

== Reproduction ==
H. borellii is oviparous.
