= Homonota marthae =

Scientific classification
- Kingdom: Animalia
- Phylum: Chordata
- Class: Reptilia
- Order: Squamata
- Suborder: Gekkota
- Family: Phyllodactylidae
- Genus: Homonota
- Species: H. marthae

Binomial name
- Homonota marthae Cacciali, Morando, Avila, & Köhler, 2018

Species of lizard

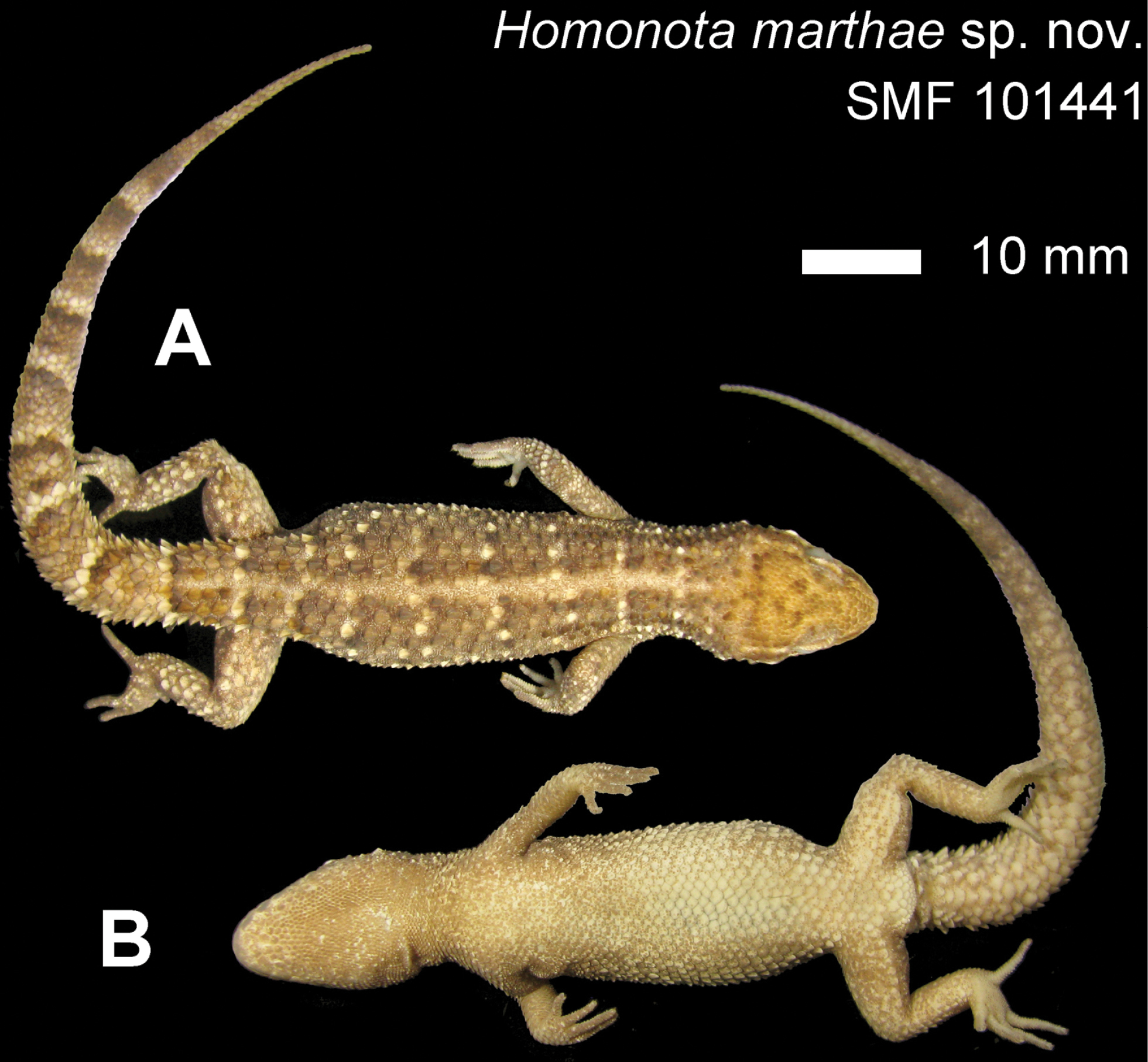
Dorsal (A) and ventral (B) views of the holotype of Homonota marthae.

Homonota marthae is a species of gecko. This newly described species is only known from Paraguay. The specific name marthae honors Martha Motte, a Paraguayan herpetologist.
