= Cei's marked gecko =

Conservation status
- Least Concern (IUCN 3.1)

Scientific classification
- Kingdom: Animalia
- Phylum: Chordata
- Class: Reptilia
- Order: Squamata
- Suborder: Gekkota
- Family: Phyllodactylidae
- Genus: Homonota
- Species: H. andicola

Binomial name
- Homonota andicola Cei, 1978

Species of lizard

Cei's marked gecko (Homonota andicola) is a species of gecko. It is endemic to Argentina.
