= Homonota septentrionalis =

Scientific classification
- Kingdom: Animalia
- Phylum: Chordata
- Class: Reptilia
- Order: Squamata
- Suborder: Gekkota
- Family: Phyllodactylidae
- Genus: Homonota
- Species: H. septentrionalis

Binomial name
- Homonota septentrionalis Cacciali, Morando, Medina, Köhler, Motte, & Avila, 2017

Species of lizard

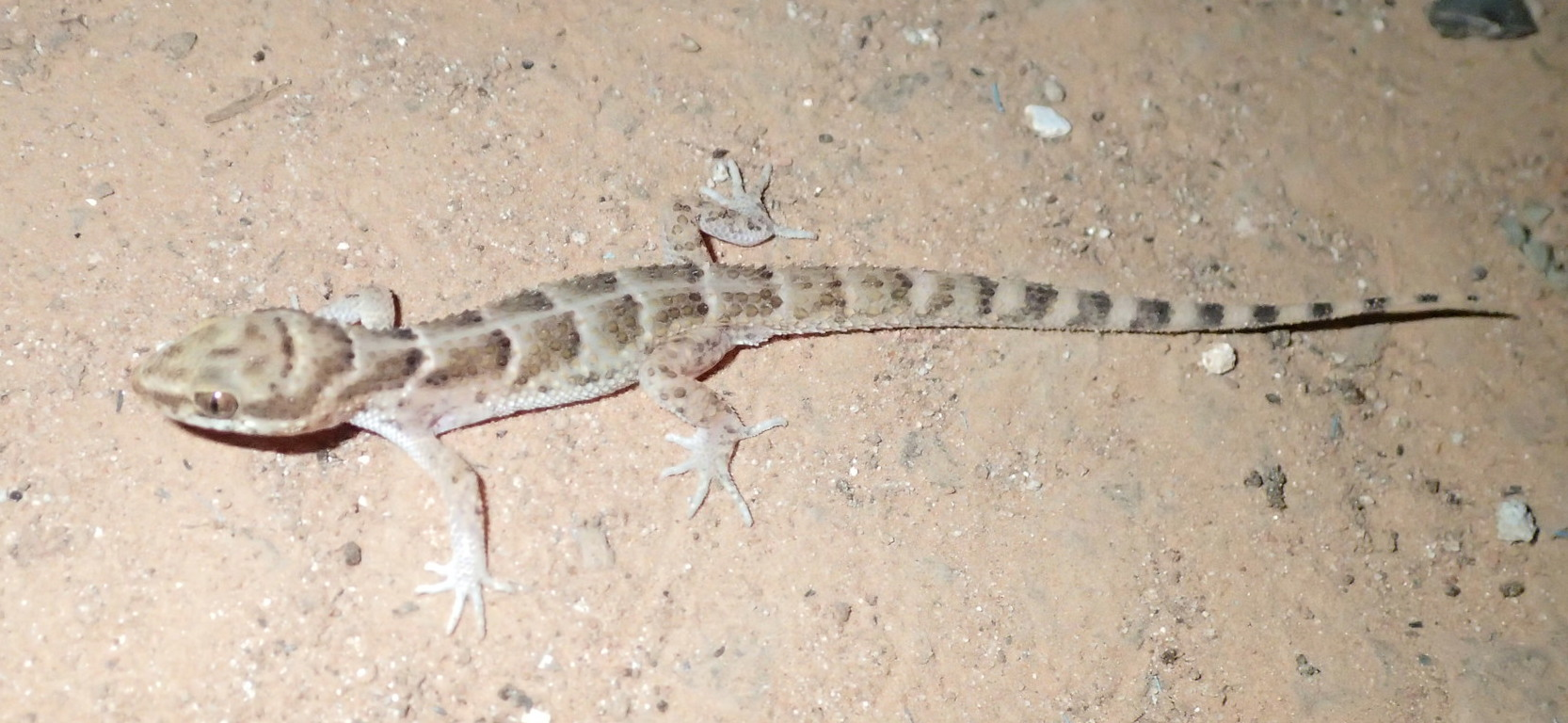

Homonota septentrionalis is a species of gecko. It lives in Paraguay and Bolivia.
