= Homonota underwoodi =

Conservation status
- Least Concern (IUCN 3.1)

Scientific classification
- Kingdom: Animalia
- Phylum: Chordata
- Class: Reptilia
- Order: Squamata
- Suborder: Gekkota
- Family: Phyllodactylidae
- Genus: Homonota
- Species: H. underwoodi

Binomial name
- Homonota underwoodi Kluge, 1964

Species of lizard

Homonota underwoodi is a species of gecko, a lizard in the family Phyllodactylidae. The species is endemic to Argentina.

== Etymology ==
The specific name, underwoodi, is in honor of British herpetologist Garth Leon Underwood (1919–2002).

== Geographic range ==
H. underwoodi is found in the Argentinian provinces of Catamarca, La Rioja, Mendoza, Río Negro, and San Juan.

== Habitat ==
The preferred natural habitat of H. underwoodi is shrubland.

== Reproduction ==
H. underwoodi is oviparous.
