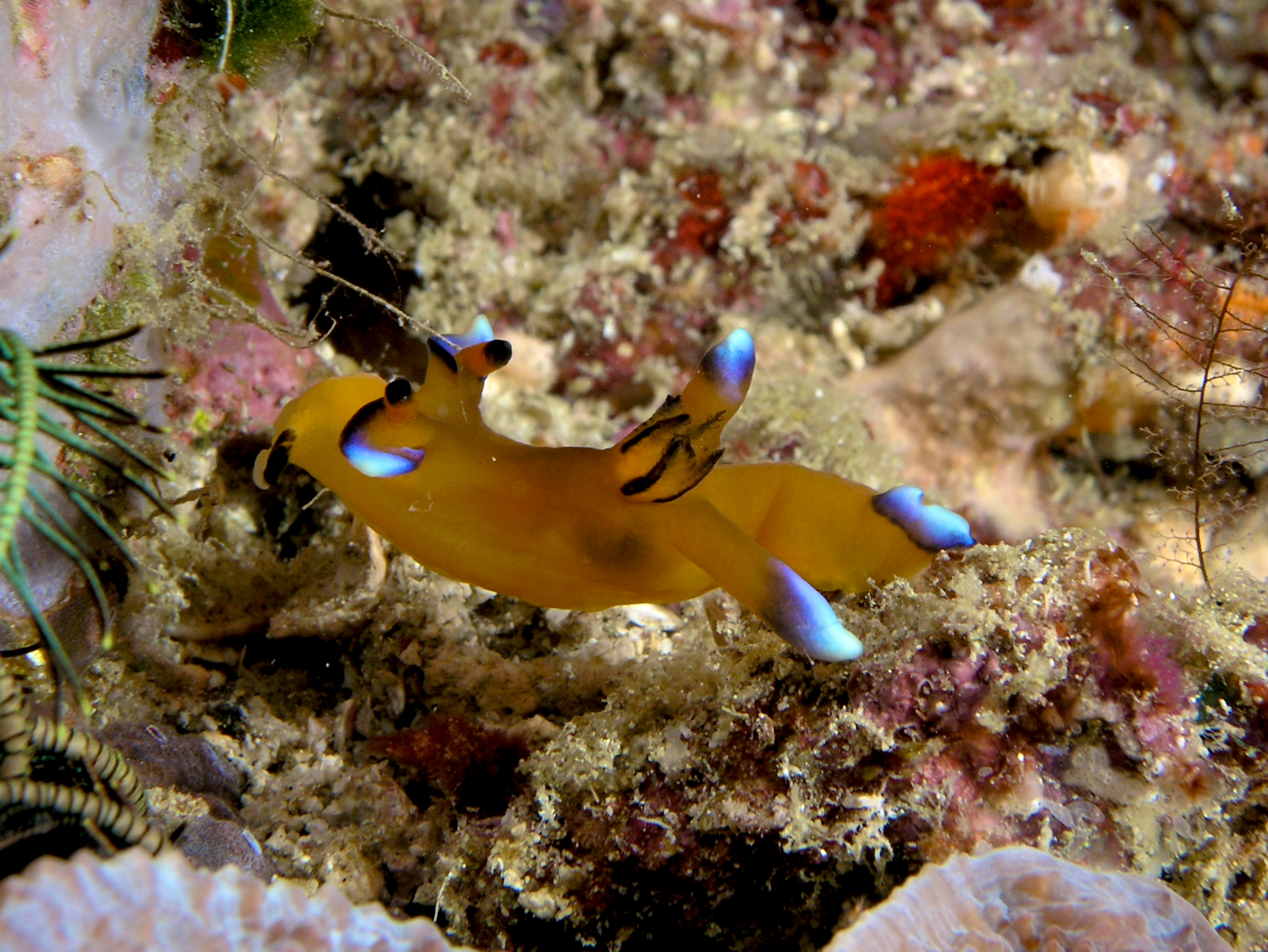
- A live individual of Thecacera pacifica in situ, head end towards the left

Scientific classification
- Kingdom: Animalia
- Phylum: Mollusca
- Class: Gastropoda
- Order: Nudibranchia
- Family: Polyceridae
- Genus: Thecacera
- Species: T. pacifica

Binomial name
- Thecacera pacifica Bergh, 1883

= Thecacera pacifica =

Species of gastropod

Thecacera pacifica is a species of sea slug, a nudibranch, a marine gastropod mollusk in the family Polyceridae. It is sometimes also nicknamed the Pikachu nudibranch due to its resemblance to the Pokémon character Pikachu.

== Distribution ==
This species is known from the African coast of the Indian Ocean (Mozambique) to Indonesia and Vanuatu. It has also been reported from the Gulf of Mexico, Atlantic Ocean.

== Description ==
This polycerid nudibranch is translucent orange in colour with black tips to the rhinophores and gills. The rhinophore sheaths are edged with black with a patch of blue at the widest part. This blue colour is also present at the tip of the tail and at the tip of the lateral papillae beside the gills, separated from the orange of the body by a black band. Some specimens have black linear marks on the body with blue centres.
