= Homonota williamsii =

Scientific classification
- Kingdom: Animalia
- Phylum: Chordata
- Class: Reptilia
- Order: Squamata
- Suborder: Gekkota
- Family: Phyllodactylidae
- Genus: Homonota
- Species: H. williamsii

Binomial name
- Homonota williamsii Ávila, Perez, Minoli, & Morando, 2012

Species of lizard

Homonota williamsii is a species of gecko. It is endemic to Argentina.
