= Homonota taragui =

Conservation status
- Critically Endangered (IUCN 3.1)

Scientific classification
- Kingdom: Animalia
- Phylum: Chordata
- Class: Reptilia
- Order: Squamata
- Suborder: Gekkota
- Family: Phyllodactylidae
- Genus: Homonota
- Species: H. taragui

Binomial name
- Homonota taragui Cajade, Etchepare, Falcione, Barrasso, & Alvarez, 2013

Species of lizard

Homonota taragui is a species of gecko. It is endemic to Argentina.
