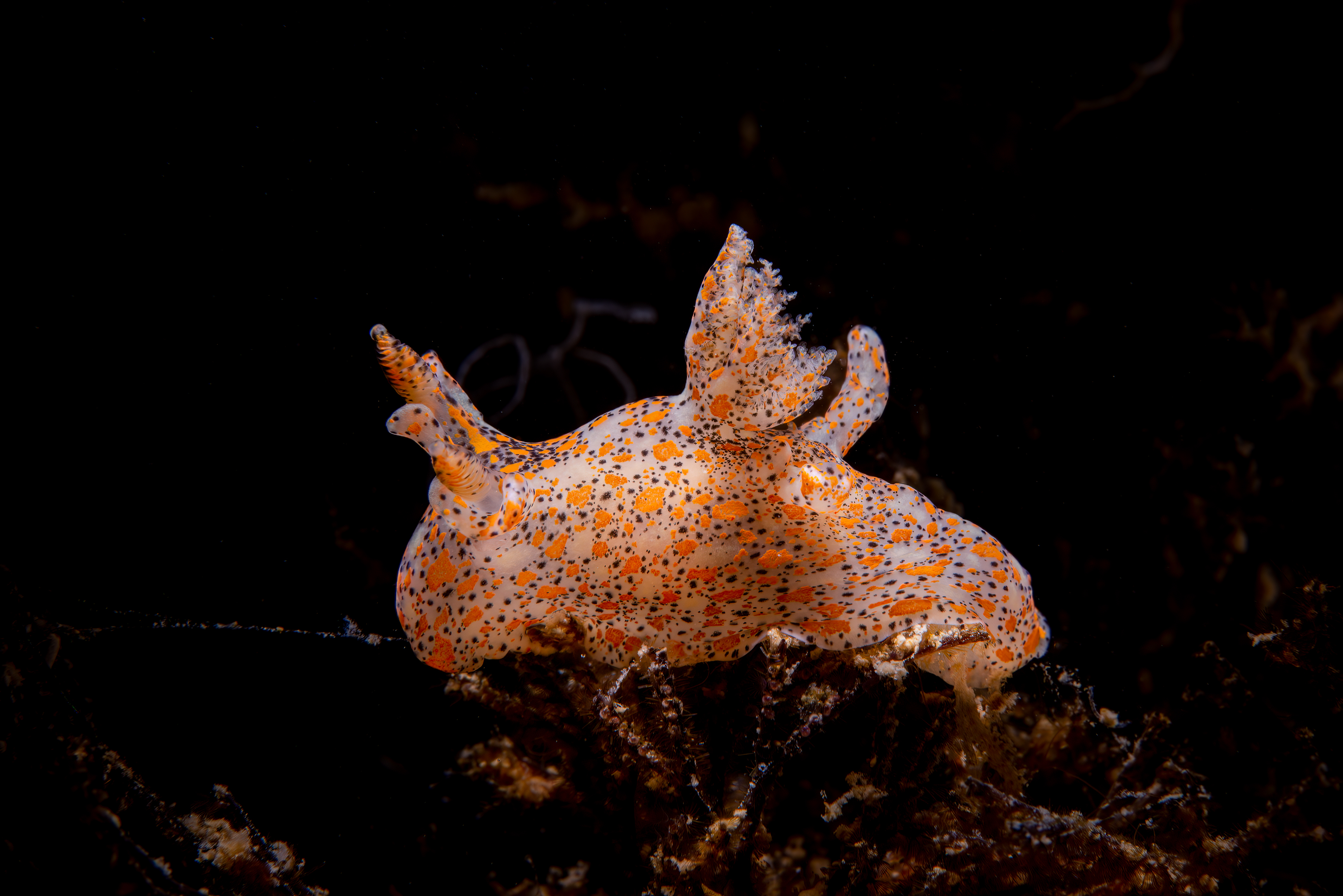
- The nudibranch Thecacera pennigera, Mar Piccolo of Taranto, Italy

Scientific classification
- Kingdom: Animalia
- Phylum: Mollusca
- Class: Gastropoda
- Order: Nudibranchia
- Family: Polyceridae
- Genus: Thecacera
- Species: T. pennigera

Binomial name
- Thecacera pennigera (Montagu, 1815)

Synonyms
- Doris pennigera Montagu, 1815; T. lamellata Barnard, 1933; T. maculata Eliot, 1905

= Thecacera pennigera =

Species of gastropod

Thecacera pennigera, common name the winged thecacera, is a species of sea slug, a nudibranch, a shell-less marine gastropod mollusc in the family Polyceridae.

== Description ==
Thecacera pennigera has a short, wide head with two lateral flaps and two sheathed olfactory organs called rhinophores. The body is wedge shaped, being wide at the front and ending in a slender foot with a lateral keel on either side. Halfway along the body are two long, thin, postbranchial processes with white tips. These are club-shaped and glandular and have a defensive function. A group of bipinnate or tripinnate gills lies just above and to the front of these processes. The general colour of the body is translucent white and the upper side is covered with orange splotches and small black spots. The adult length is usually between 15 millimetres (0.6 in) and 30 millimetres (1.2 in).

== Distribution and habitat ==
Thecacera pennigera was described from the south coast of England. It has been reported to have a cosmopolitan distribution, being found in temperate waters on either side of the North Atlantic Ocean, in the Mediterranean Sea, around South and West Africa, Brazil, Japan, Korea, Pakistan, and more recently in Australia and New Zealand. There is a significant difference in colouring between Atlantic populations and Pacific specimens which may indicate that this is a complex of several species rather than a single cosmopolitan species. When conditions are suitable, it can occur in considerable numbers, but often it is sporadic or even rare. It is found at depths of down to 36 metres (120 ft) living on arborescent bryozoans. In the N. E. Atlantic (type locality) it feeds exclusively on the bryozoan Bugula plumosa. These sometimes foul the hulls of vessels and both the bryozoans and the nudibranch have been extending their ranges, presumably travelling by ship.

== Biology ==
Like other sea slugs, Thecacera pennigera is a hermaphrodite. Packets of sperm are exchanged by mating pairs of slugs and fertilisation is internal. The fertilised eggs are deposited in strings draped across the substrate, usually bryozoans of the genus Bugula, on which the sea slug feeds. It is not clear whether there is a planktonic larval stage or whether juvenile sea slugs hatch direct from the eggs.
