= Homonota itambere =

Scientific classification
- Domain: Eukaryota
- Kingdom: Animalia
- Phylum: Chordata
- Class: Reptilia
- Order: Squamata
- Infraorder: Gekkota
- Family: Phyllodactylidae
- Genus: Homonota
- Species: H. itambere

Binomial name
- Homonota itambere Cabral & Cacciali, 2021

Species of lizard

Homonota itambere is a species of gecko. It is endemic to Paraguay.
