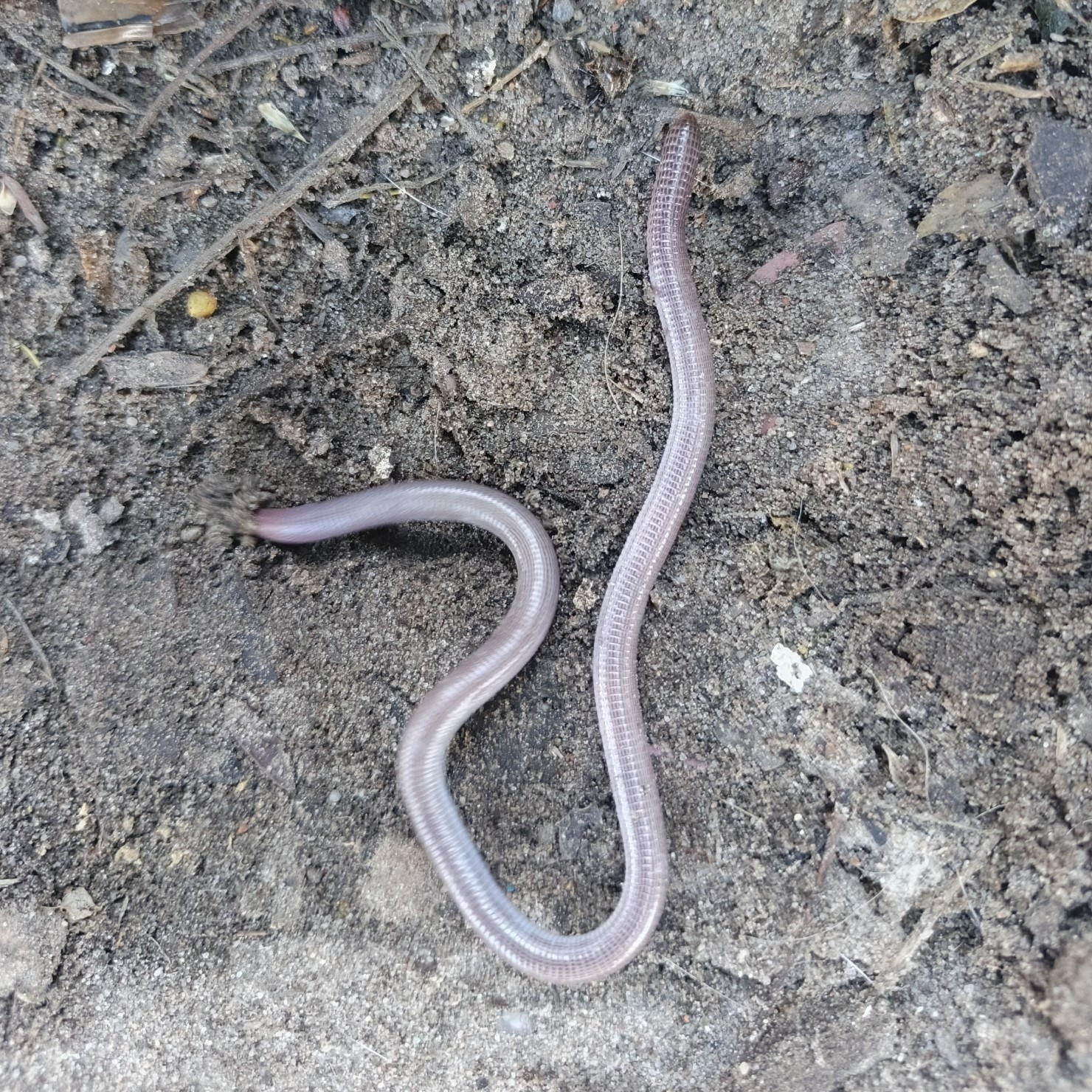

Conservation status
- Least Concern (IUCN 3.1)

Scientific classification
- Kingdom: Animalia
- Phylum: Chordata
- Class: Reptilia
- Order: Squamata
- Clade: Amphisbaenia
- Family: Amphisbaenidae
- Genus: Amphisbaena
- Species: A. borelli

Binomial name
- Amphisbaena borelli Peracca, 1897

Synonyms
- Amphisbaena borelli Peracca, 1897; Amphisbaena steindachneri borelli — Gans, 1964; Leposternon borelli — Gallardo, 1969; Cercolophia borelli — Vanzolini, 1992; Amphisbaena borelli — Mott & Vieites, 2009; Cercolophia borelli — Avila et al., 2013

= Amphisbaena borelli =

Species of lizard

Amphisbaena borelli is a species of worm lizard in the family Amphisbaenidae. The species is native to central South America.

== Taxonomy ==
The specific name, borelli, is in honor of French-born Italian ornithologist Alfredo Borelli.

== Description ==
Dorsally, A. borelli is grayish brown, with each segment being darker in the center. Ventally, it is dirty white, without markings.

== Distribution and habitat ==
A. borelli is found in Argentina (Salta Province) and Bolivia (Santa Cruz Department and Tarija Department).

The preferred habitats of A. borelli are forest and savanna.

== Reproduction ==
A. borelli is oviparous.
