= Homonota rupicola =

Conservation status
- Critically Endangered (IUCN 3.1)

Scientific classification
- Kingdom: Animalia
- Phylum: Chordata
- Class: Reptilia
- Order: Squamata
- Suborder: Gekkota
- Family: Phyllodactylidae
- Genus: Homonota
- Species: H. rupicola

Binomial name
- Homonota rupicola Cacciali, Ávila & Bauer, 2007

Species of lizard

Homonota rupicola is a species of gecko. It is endemic to Paraguay.
