= R. darwinii =

R. darwinii may refer to:

- Rhea darwinii, a synonym for Rhea pennata, Darwin's rhea, a flightless bird species
- Rhinoderma darwinii, the Darwin's frog, a frog species native to the forest streams of Argentina and Chile

== See also ==
- Darwinii (disambiguation)
- R. darwinii (disambiguation)
