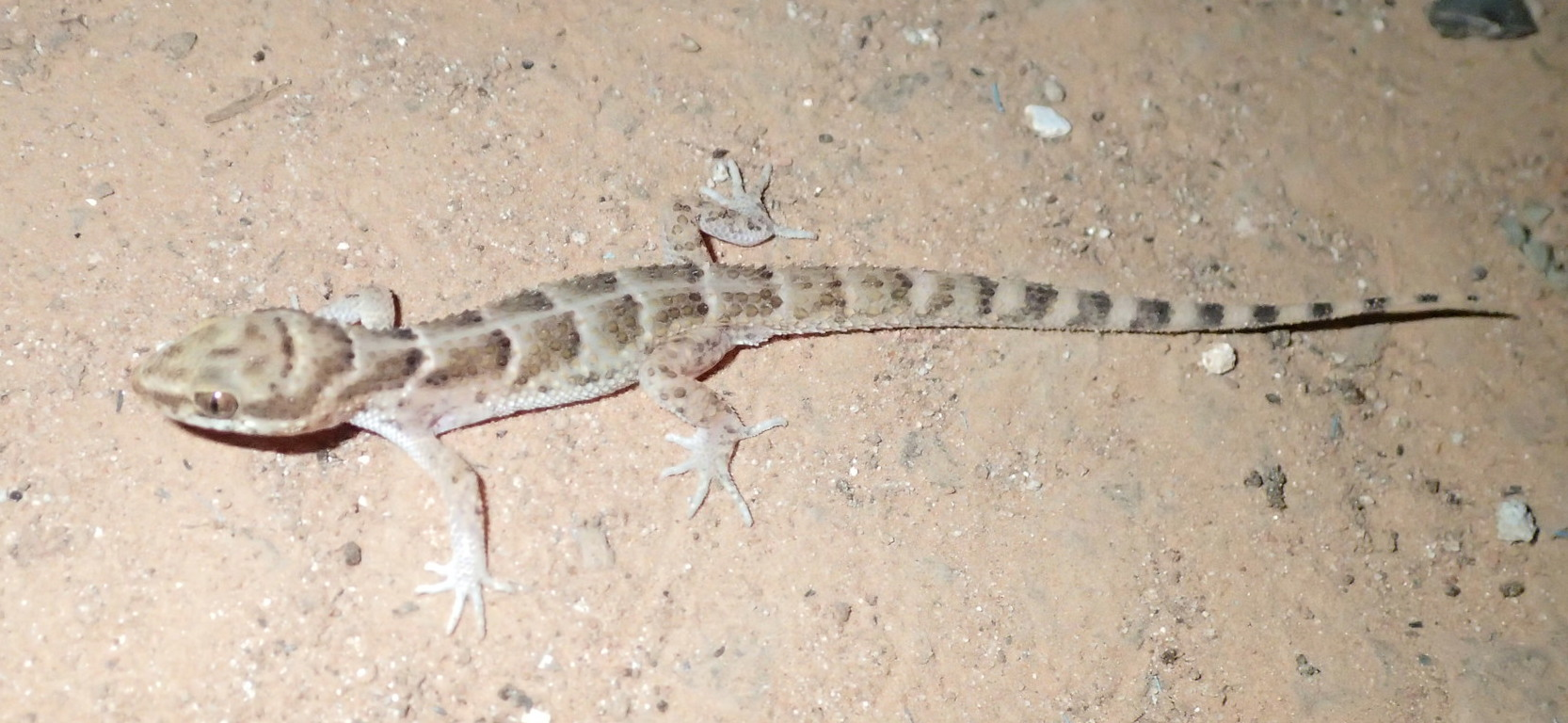
- Homonota septentrionalis

Scientific classification
- Kingdom: Animalia
- Phylum: Chordata
- Class: Reptilia
- Order: Squamata
- Suborder: Gekkota
- Family: Phyllodactylidae
- Genus: Homonota; Gray, 1845

= Homonota =

Genus of lizards

Homonota is a genus of South American geckos, commonly known as marked geckos.

== Species & subspecies ==
- Homonota andicola Cei, 1978 – Cei's marked gecko
- Homonota borellii (Peracca, 1897) – Borelli's marked gecko
- Homonota darwinii Boulenger, 1885 – Darwin's marked gecko
  - Homonota darwinii darwinii Boulenger, 1885
  - Homonota darwinii macrocephala Cei, 1978
- Homonota fasciata (A.M.C. Duméril & Bibron, 1836) – South American marked gecko
- Homonota horrida (Burmeister, 1861) – South American marked gecko
- Homonota itambere Cabral & Cacciali, 2021
- Homonota marthae Cacciali, Morando, L. Avila & G. Köhler, 2018
- Homonota rupicola Cacciali, I. Ávila & Bauer, 2007
- Homonota septentrionalis Cacciali, Morando, Medina, G. Köhler, Motte & L. Avila, 2017
- Homonota taragui Cajade, Etchepare, Falcione, Barrasso & Alvarez, 2013
- Homonota underwoodi Kluge, 1964 – Underwood's marked gecko
- Homonota uruguayensis (Vaz-Ferreira & Sierra de Soriano, 1961) - Uruguay marked gecko
- Homonota whitii Boulenger, 1885 - Argentine marked gecko
- Homonota williamsii L. Ávila, Perez, Minoli & Morando, 2012

Nota bene: A binomial authority or trinomial authority in parentheses indicates that the species or subspecies was originally described in a genus other than Homonota.

== Geographic range ==
Species within this genus are known to occur in many parts of South America.
