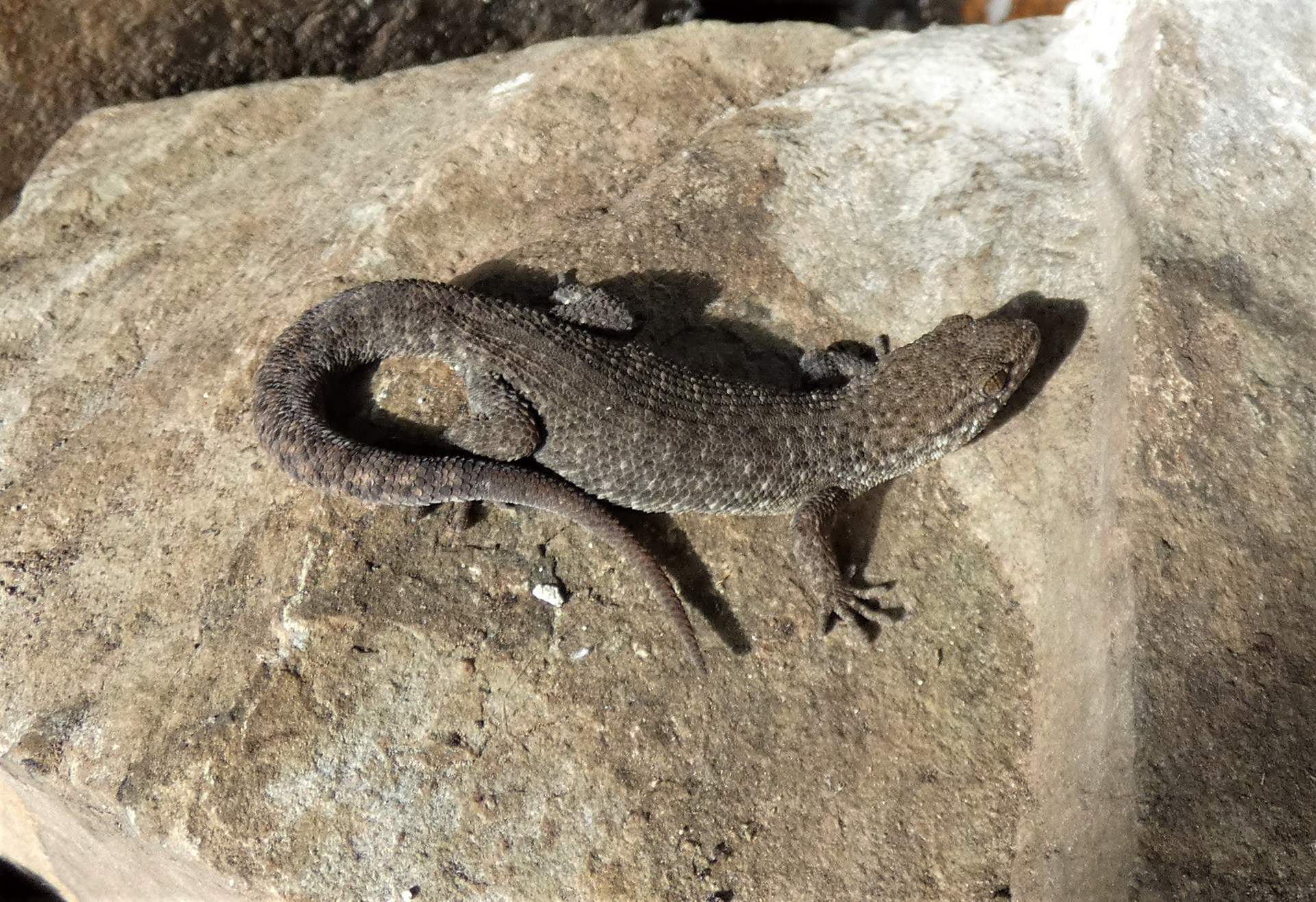
- Photo by National Museum of Natural History, Uruguay

Scientific classification
- Domain: Eukaryota
- Kingdom: Animalia
- Phylum: Chordata
- Class: Reptilia
- Order: Squamata
- Infraorder: Gekkota
- Family: Phyllodactylidae
- Genus: Homonota
- Species: H. uruguayensis

Binomial name
- Homonota uruguayensis (Vaz-Ferreira & Sierra de Soriano, 1961)

Synonyms
- Wallsaurus uruguayensis Vaz-Ferreira & Sierra de Soriano, 1961; Gymnodactylus uruguayensis (Vaz-Ferreira & Sierra de Soriano, 1961)

= Uruguay marked gecko =

Species of lizard

The Uruguay marked gecko (Homonota uruguayensis) is a species of gecko. It lives in Uruguay and southernmost Brazil (Rio Grande do Sul).
