= Hypostomus borellii =

Conservation status
- Near Threatened (IUCN 3.1)

Scientific classification
- Kingdom: Animalia
- Phylum: Chordata
- Class: Actinopterygii
- Division: Teleostei
- Order: Siluriformes
- Family: Loricariidae
- Genus: Hypostomus
- Species: H. borellii

Binomial name
- Hypostomus borellii (Boulenger, 1897)

Synonyms<
- Plecostomus borellii Boulenger, 1897

Species of fish

Hypostomus borellii is a species of freshwater ray-finned fish belonging to the family Loricariidae, the suckermouth armored catfishes, and the subfamily Hypostominae, the suckermouth catfishes. This catfish is found in the Lipeo River in Argentina and Pilcomayo River in Bolivia. This species reaches a standard length of 16.1 cm (6.3 in).

== Etymology ==
Hypostomus borellii is named in honor of French-born Italian zoologist Alfredo Borelli (1858–1943) of the Università di Torino, who led three expeditions to South America and collected many animals, including the holotype of this species.
