= Argentine marked gecko =

Conservation status
- Least Concern (IUCN 3.1)

Scientific classification
- Kingdom: Animalia
- Phylum: Chordata
- Class: Reptilia
- Order: Squamata
- Suborder: Gekkota
- Family: Phyllodactylidae
- Genus: Homonota
- Species: H. whitii

Binomial name
- Homonota whitii Boulenger, 1885

Species of lizard

The Argentine marked gecko (Homonota whitii) is a species of lizard in the family Phyllodactylidae. The species is endemic to Argentina.

== Etymology ==
The specific name, whitii, is in honor of naturalist Ernest William White (1858–1884) who collected the holotype.

== Geographic range ==
H. whitii is found in northwestern Argentina, in the provinces of Catamarca, Córdoba, La Rioja, Mendoza, Salta, and Tucumán.

== Habitat ==
The preferred natural habitat of H. whitii is forest.

== Reproduction ==
H. whitii is oviparous.
