= Darwinii =

Darwinii, a Latin word commonly referring to English naturalist Charles Darwin (1809–1882), may refer to:

== Species ==
- Amphisbaena darwinii
- Diplolaemus darwinii
- Gymnodactylus darwinii
- Homonota darwinii
- Liolaemus darwinii

== Subspecies ==
- Distephanopsis crux subsp. darwinii
- Distephanus crux subsp. darwinii
- Homonota darwinii darwinii, a subspecies in the gecko species Homonota darwinii and the genus Homonota
- Yucca × Darwinii, a variety in the genus Yucca created by German botanist Carl Ludwig Sprenger (1846–1917)

== See also ==
- Darwini (disambiguation)
