= Thecacera boyla =

Scientific classification
- Kingdom: Animalia
- Phylum: Mollusca
- Class: Gastropoda
- Order: Nudibranchia
- Family: Polyceridae
- Genus: Thecacera
- Species: T. boyla

Binomial name
- Thecacera boyla Willan, 1989

Species of gastropod

Thecacera boyla is a species of sea slug, a dorid nudibranch, a marine gastropod mollusc in the family Polyceridae.

== Distribution ==
This species was first described from Queensland, Australia.

== Description ==
This polycerid nudibranch is translucent grey in colour, with extensive mottled patches of light and dark green pigment.
