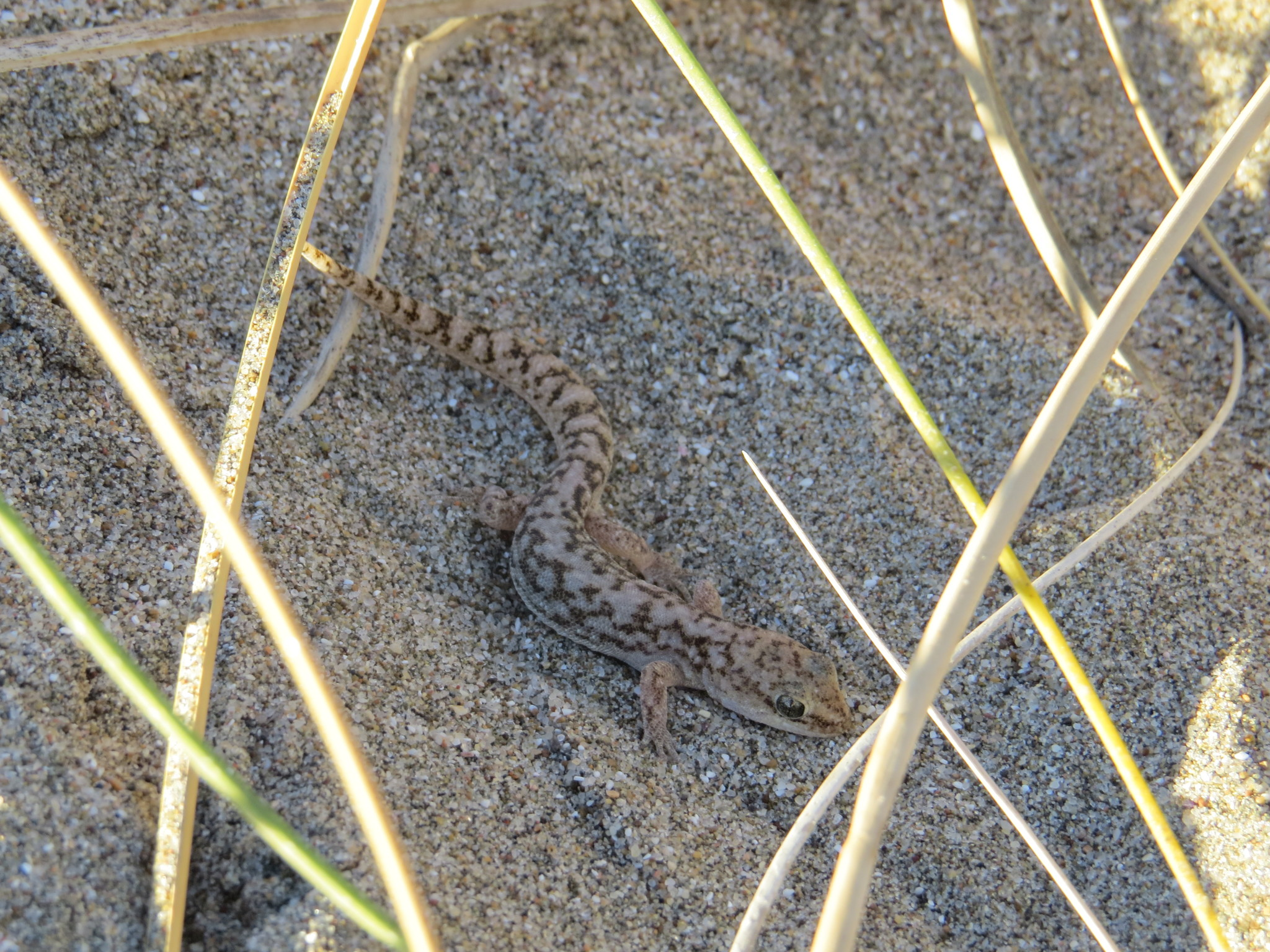

Conservation status
- Least Concern (IUCN 3.1)

Scientific classification
- Kingdom: Animalia
- Phylum: Chordata
- Class: Reptilia
- Order: Squamata
- Suborder: Gekkota
- Family: Phyllodactylidae
- Genus: Homonota
- Species: H. darwinii

Binomial name
- Homonota darwinii Boulenger, 1885

= Homonota darwinii =

Species of lizard

Homonota darwinii, also known commonly as Darwin's marked gecko or the prickly gecko, is a species of lizard in the family Phyllodactylidae. The species is endemic to Argentina. There are two recognized subspecies.

== Etymology ==
The specific name, darwinii, is in honor of English naturalist Charles Darwin, author of On the Origin of Species.

== Habitat ==
The preferred natural habitats of H. darwinii are grassland, shrubland, and forest.

== Reproduction ==
H. darwinii is oviparous.

== Subspecies ==
Two subspecies are recognized as being valid, including the nominotypical subspecies.

- Homonota darwinii darwinii Boulenger, 1885
- Homonota darwinii macrocephala Cei, 1978
