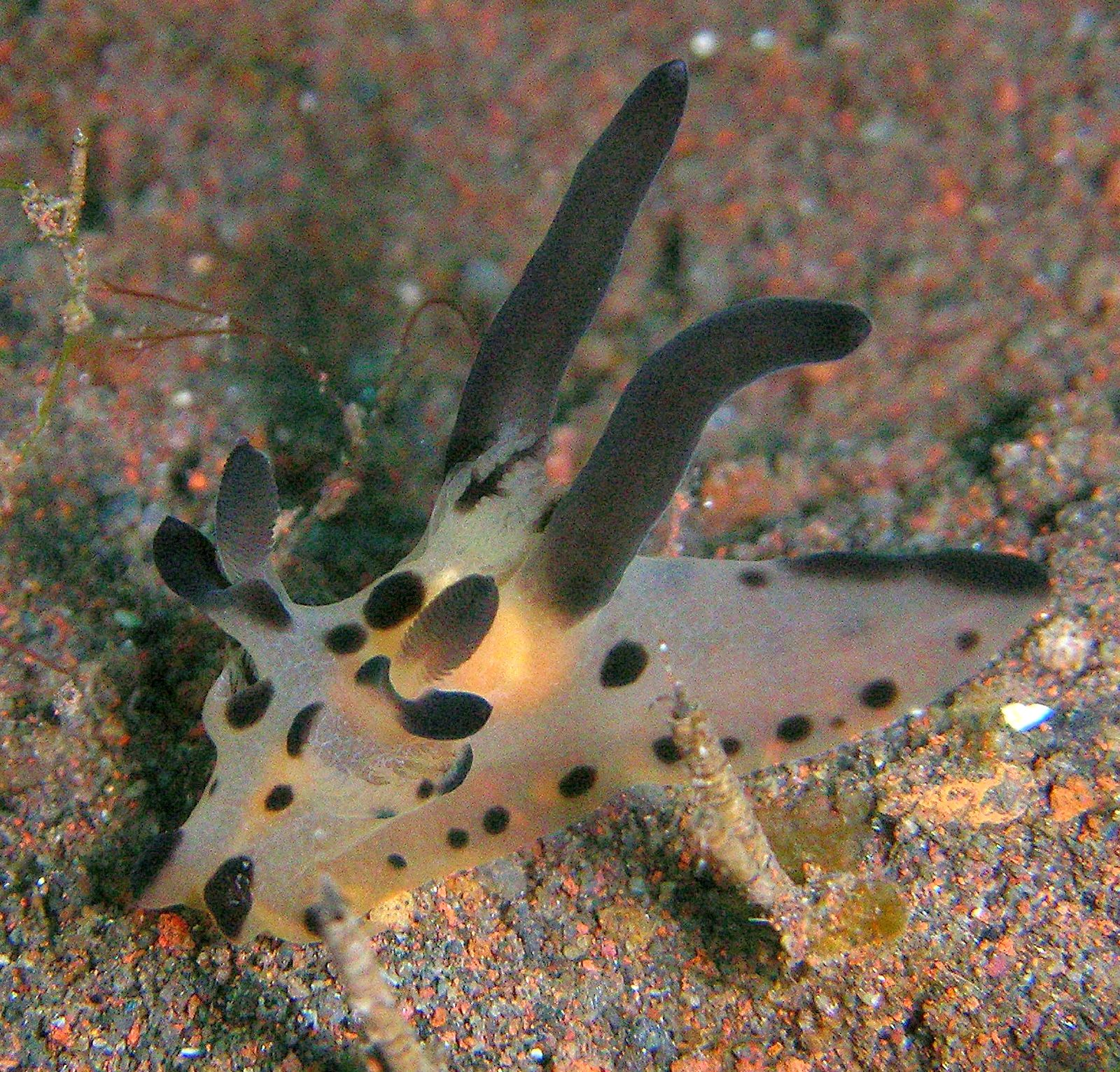
- A live individual of Rudman's Thecacera species 2, head end towards the left

Scientific classification
- Kingdom: Animalia
- Phylum: Mollusca
- Class: Gastropoda
- Order: Nudibranchia
- Family: Polyceridae
- Subfamily: Polycerinae
- Genus: Thecacera; Fleming, 1828

Type species
- Thecacera pennigera (Montagu, 1815)

= Thecacera =

Genus of gastropods

Thecacera is a genus of sea slugs, specifically nudibranchs, shell-less marine gastropod mollusks in the family Polyceridae.

== Species ==
This genus currently contains eight described species. A list of them can be found below:

- Thecacera boyla Willan, 1989
- Thecacera darwini Pruvot-Fol, 1950
- Thecacera pacifica Bergh, 1883
- Thecacera pennigera (Montagu, 1815)
- Thecacera picta Baba, 1972
- Thecacera sesama Chan & Lee et al. 2026
- Thecacera virescens Alder & Hancock, 1851
- Thecacera vittata Yonow, 1994
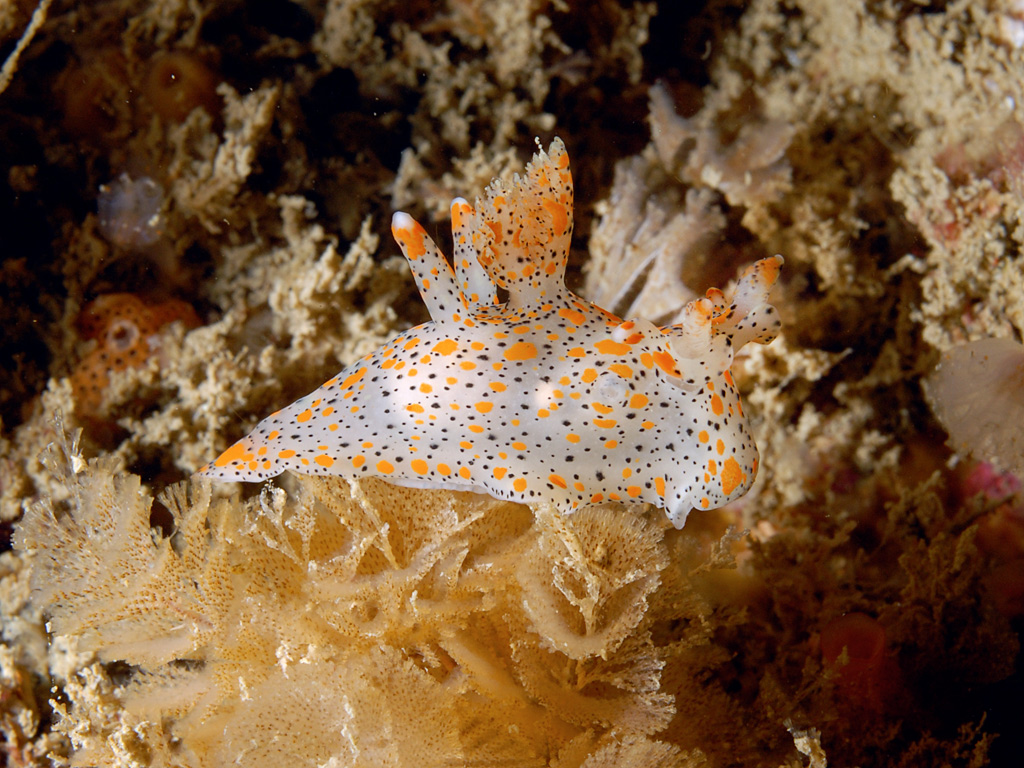
Thecacera pennigera

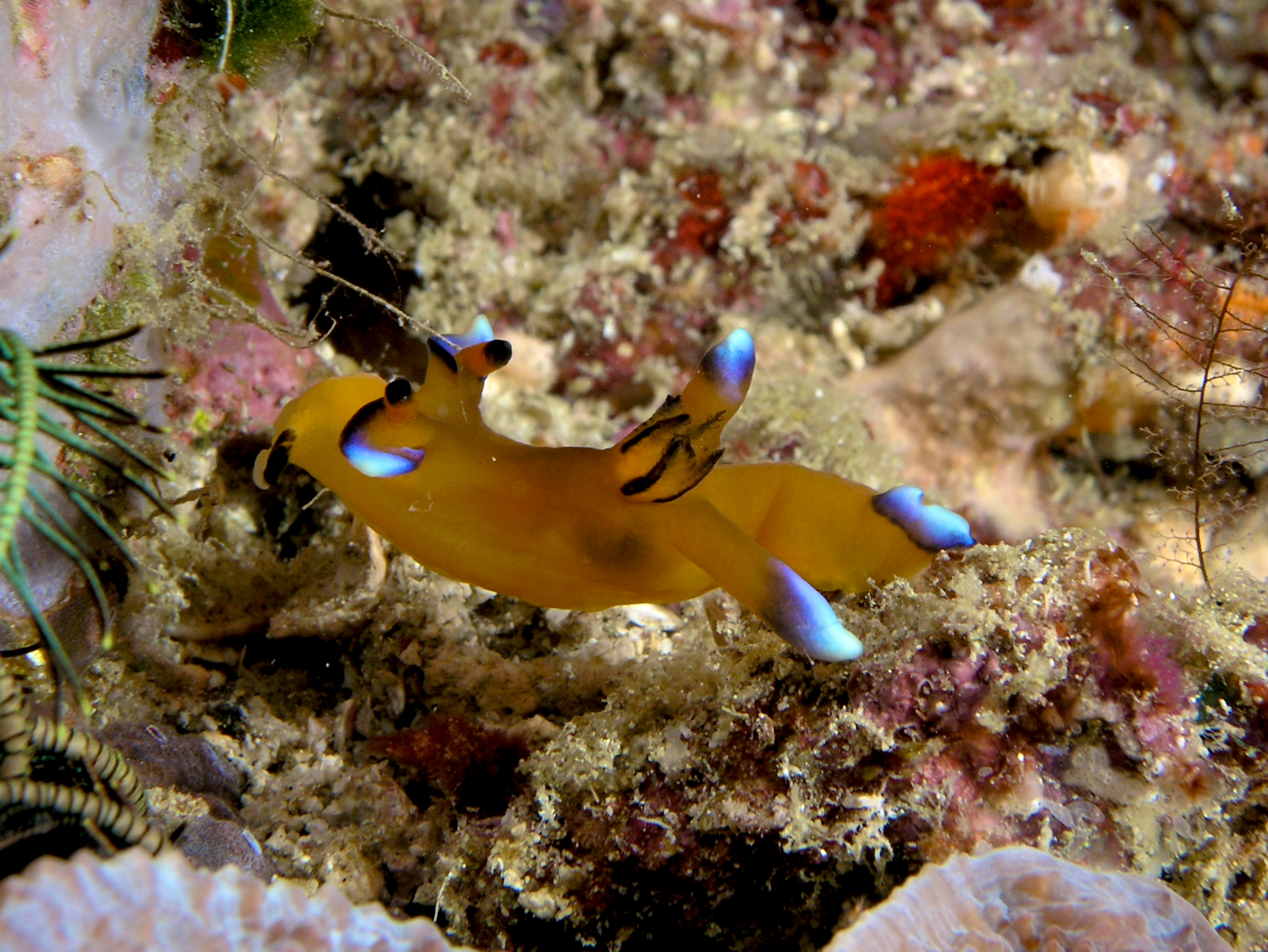
Thecacera pacifica

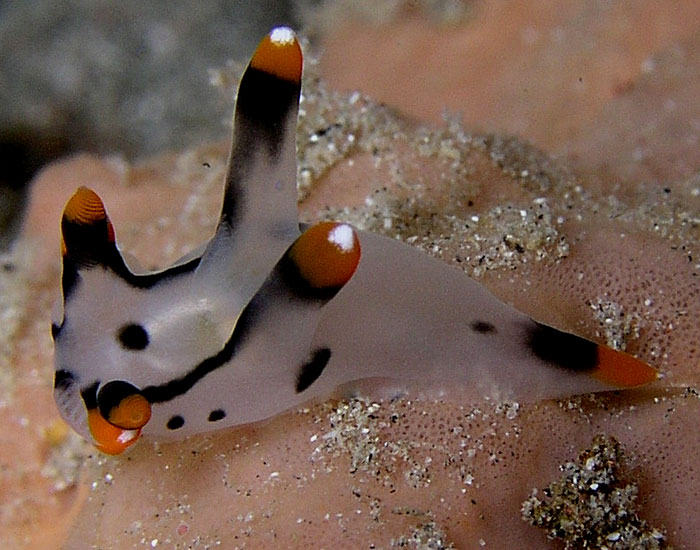
Thecacera picta

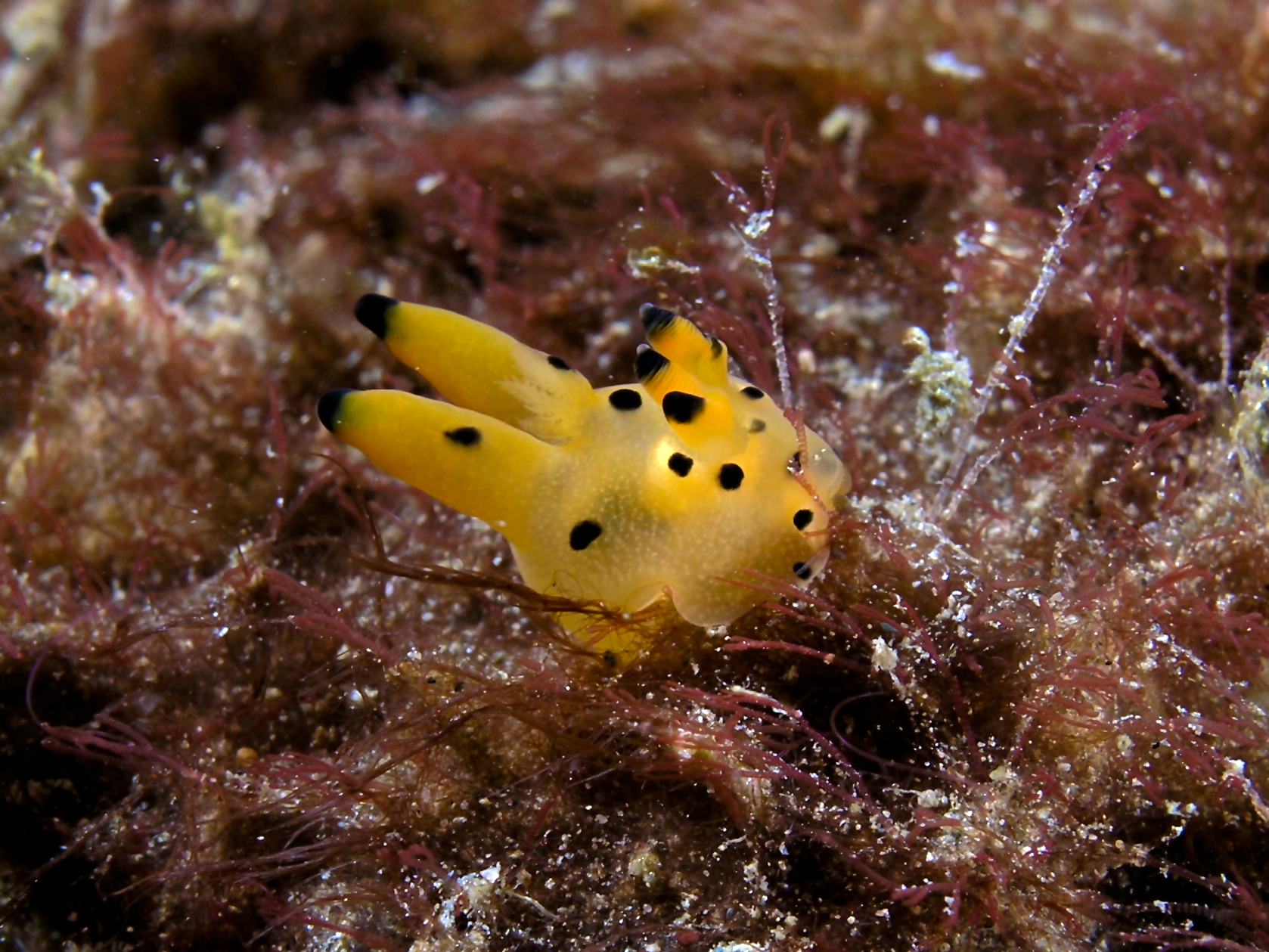
Rudman's Thecacera species 2
