= Alfredo Borelli =

Italian zoologist (1858–1943)

- Born: 18 November 1858; Marseille
- Died: 6 May 1943 (aged 84); Boves
- Education: Aix University; University of Turin
- Occupation: Zoologist

Alfredo Borelli (18 November 1858 – 6 May 1943) was a French-born Italian zoologist, who worked mainly in Turin but who, early in his natural history career, conducted field work in South America.

Borelli graduated in law from Aix University in 1888 and practised as a lawyer in Marseille for a while before deciding to follow his interest in the natural sciences, going to his family's home country of Italy and graduating from the University of Turin in 1886. He worked in Munich and Berlin but most of his scientific career was spent at the Institute of Zoology of the University of Turin, from where he retired in 1930.

He worked at the Museo Regionale di Scienze Naturali di Torino from 1900 to 1913. He carried out field work in Bolivia, Argentina, and Paraguay where he collected specimens, and many of his specimens were described by Mario Giacinto Peracca.

== Taxa named in Borelli's honor ==
Hypostomus borellii is a species of catfish in the family Loricariidae. It is native to the upper and middle Pilcomayo River basin in Argentina, Uruguay, and Bolivia.

Homonota borellii is a species of gecko in the family Phyllodactylidae. The species is endemic to South America.

Amphisbaena borelli is a species of worm lizard in the family Amphisbaenidae. The species is native to central South America.

Urostreptus borellii, a species of millipede.(Silvestri, 1895)

Apistogramma borellii is a species of fish in the genus Apistogramma. It is found in the Paraguay River and Paraná River.
