= Homonota horrida =

Scientific classification
- Kingdom: Animalia
- Phylum: Chordata
- Class: Reptilia
- Order: Squamata
- Suborder: Gekkota
- Family: Phyllodactylidae
- Genus: Homonota
- Species: H. horrida

Binomial name
- Homonota horrida (Burmeister, 1861)

Synonyms
- Gymnodactylus horridus Burmeister, 1861

Species of lizard

Homonota horrida, also known as South American marked gecko, is a species of gecko. It lives in Argentina and Paraguay.
