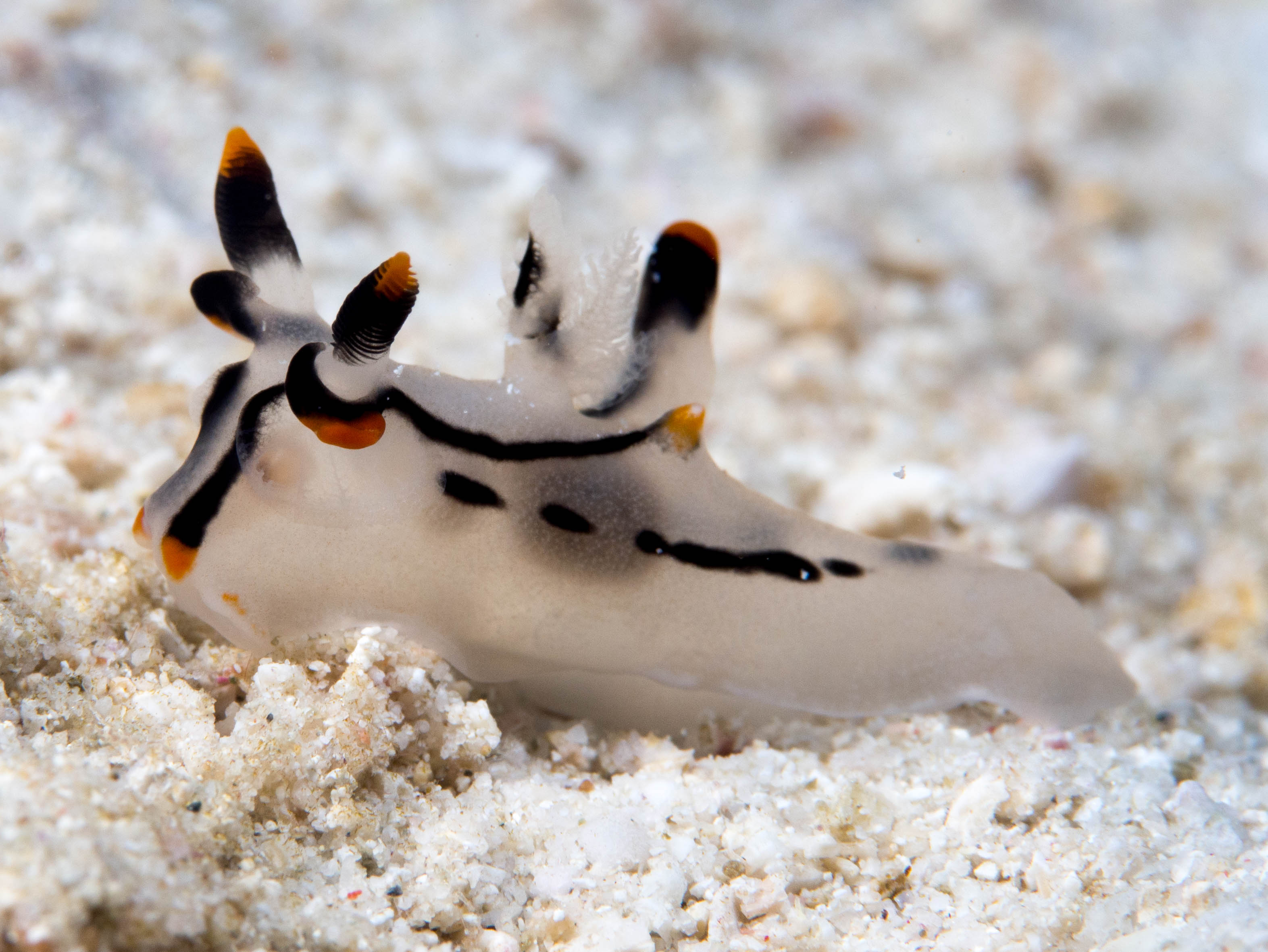

Scientific classification
- Kingdom: Animalia
- Phylum: Mollusca
- Class: Gastropoda
- Order: Nudibranchia
- Family: Polyceridae
- Genus: Thecacera
- Species: T. picta

Binomial name
- Thecacera picta Baba, 1972

= Thecacera picta =

Species of gastropod

Thecacera picta is a species of sea slug, a nudibranch, a shell-less marine gastropod mollusc in the family Polyceridae.

The type locality for this species is Suruga Bay, Japan.
