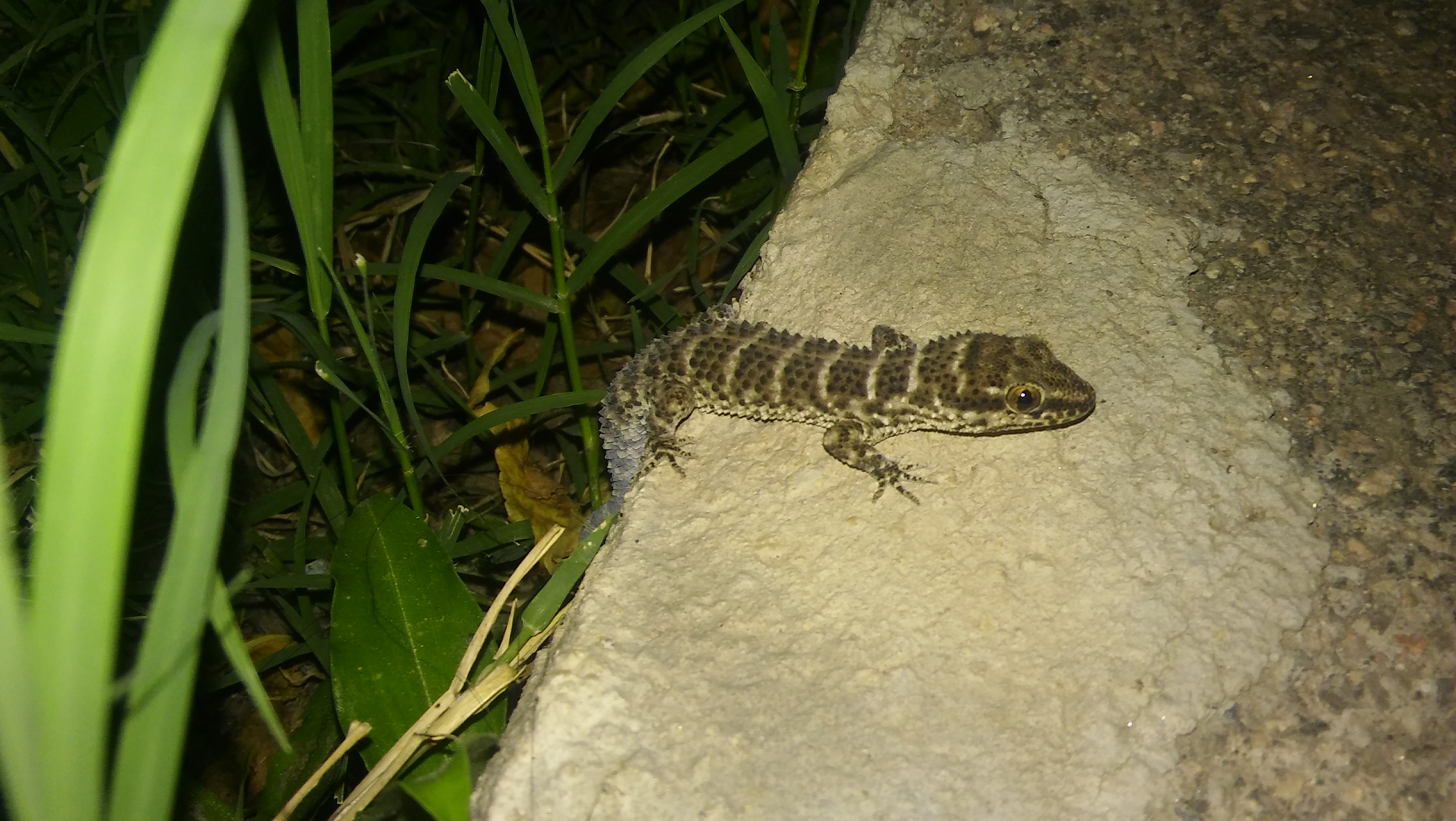

Conservation status
- Least Concern (IUCN 3.1)

Scientific classification
- Kingdom: Animalia
- Phylum: Chordata
- Class: Reptilia
- Order: Squamata
- Suborder: Gekkota
- Family: Phyllodactylidae
- Genus: Homonota
- Species: H. fasciata

Binomial name
- Homonota fasciata (A.M.C. Duméril & Bibron, 1836)

Synonyms
- Gymnodactylus fasciatus A.M.C. Duméril & Bibron, 1831; Gymnodactylus horridus Burmeister, 1861; Homonota horrida Burmeister, 1861; Wallsaurus horridus Burmeister, 1861

= Homonota fasciata =

Species of lizard

Homonota fasciata, also known as the South American marked gecko, is a nocturnal species of gecko. It lives in Bolivia, and Argentina. It is found in tropical deciduous forest and desert scrub habitats. It feeds on insects.
