= Thecacera darwini =

Scientific classification
- Kingdom: Animalia
- Phylum: Mollusca
- Class: Gastropoda
- Order: Nudibranchia
- Family: Polyceridae
- Genus: Thecacera
- Species: T. darwini

Binomial name
- Thecacera darwini Pruvot-Fol, 1950

Species of gastropod

Thecacera darwini is a species of sea slug, a dorid nudibranch, a marine gastropod mollusc in the family Polyceridae.

== Distribution ==
This species was first described from Chile, South America. It was first collected by Charles Darwin.

== Description ==
This polycerid nudibranch is translucent white in colour, with scattered black spots. The tip of the tail, gills, rhinophores and rhinophore sheaths are yellow.

== Ecology ==
Thecacera darwini feeds on the bryozoan Beania magellanica.
