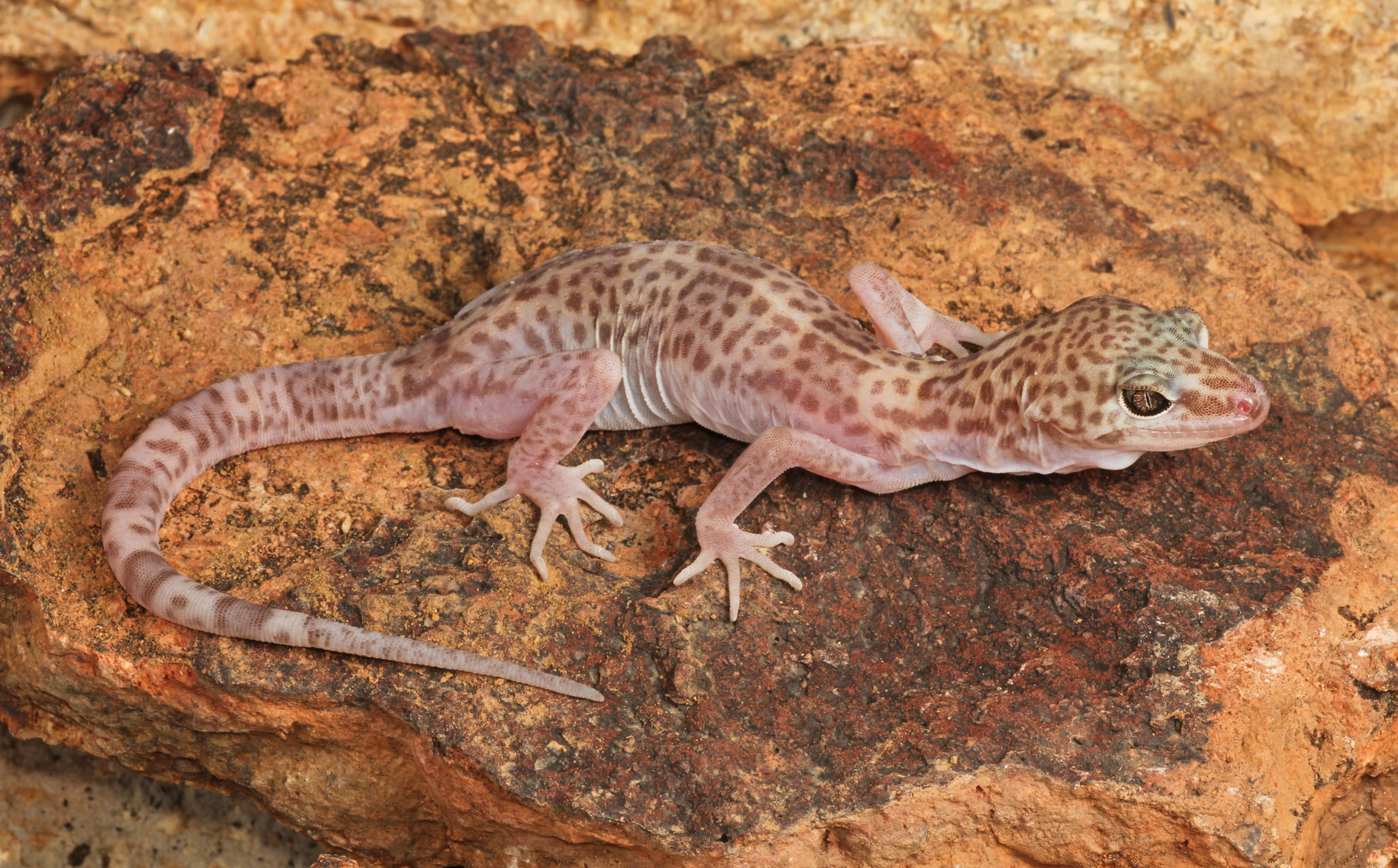

Conservation status
- Least Concern (IUCN 3.1)

Scientific classification
- Kingdom: Animalia
- Phylum: Chordata
- Order: Squamata
- Suborder: Gekkota
- Family: Eublepharidae
- Genus: Coleonyx
- Species: C. reticulatus

Binomial name
- Coleonyx reticulatus Davis & Dixon, 1958

= Reticulate banded gecko =

Species of lizard

The reticulate banded gecko or reticulated gecko (Coleonyx reticulatus) is a species of small gecko native to the United States (Texas) and Mexico (Coahuila).

== Description ==
Reticulate banded geckos can grow to 6.5 inches long, and are a pink or brown color with brown or black spots, sometimes with faint banding. They can easily be mistaken for the Texas banded gecko as they share habitat, but the reticulate banded gecko grows to a larger size. They resemble leopard geckos.

== Behavior ==
It is nocturnal and carnivorous, consuming almost any small species of arthropod. They are found in semi-arid, rocky areas. They are capable of vocalizations, and sometimes will emit squeaking sounds if handled.

== Conservation concerns ==
The reticulate banded gecko is listed as a threatened species in the state of Texas, as it only occurs in two counties, but its habitat is fairly remote and not easily accessible and is not under immediate threat. Also, part of its habitat is found within the protected confines of Big Bend National Park.
