= Coleonyx nemoralis =

Scientific classification
- Kingdom: Animalia
- Phylum: Chordata
- Class: Reptilia
- Order: Squamata
- Suborder: Gekkota
- Family: Eublepharidae
- Genus: Coleonyx
- Species: C. nemoralis

Binomial name
- Coleonyx nemoralis Klauber, 1945

Synonyms
- Coleonyx elegans nemoralis Klauber, 1945

Species of lizard

Coleonyx nemoralis is a species of gecko from the family Eublepharidae. It was originally described as subspecies of Coleonyx elegans. However, a 2022 study using genetic methods recognized it as distinct species. It is, as currently known, endemic to the Pacific lowlands of southwestern Mexico. However, its true range likely extends into Guatemala and possibly as far as northwestern El Salvador. In contrast, Coleonyx elegans sensu stricto occurs on the lowlands of the Gulf of Mexico and the Yucatan Peninsula. Genetic data suggest that the two lineages diverged in late Pliocene.

Coleonyx nemoralis is oviparous.
