= Coleonyx gypsicolus =

Conservation status
- Least Concern (IUCN 3.1)

Scientific classification
- Kingdom: Animalia
- Phylum: Chordata
- Class: Reptilia
- Order: Squamata
- Suborder: Gekkota
- Family: Eublepharidae
- Genus: Coleonyx
- Species: C. gypsicolus

Binomial name
- Coleonyx gypsicolus Grismer & Ottlery, 1988

Species of lizard

Coleonyx gypsicolus, sometimes called the Isla San Marcos barefoot banded gecko is a gecko endemic to Isla San Marcos in Mexico. It is sometimes considered a subspecies of Switak's banded gecko.
