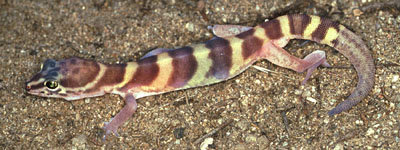
- San Diego banded gecko, (Coleonyx variegatus abbotti)

Scientific classification
- Kingdom: Animalia
- Phylum: Chordata
- Class: Reptilia
- Order: Squamata
- Suborder: Gekkota
- Family: Eublepharidae
- Genus: Coleonyx; Gray, 1845

Species
- See text

= Coleonyx =

Genus of lizards

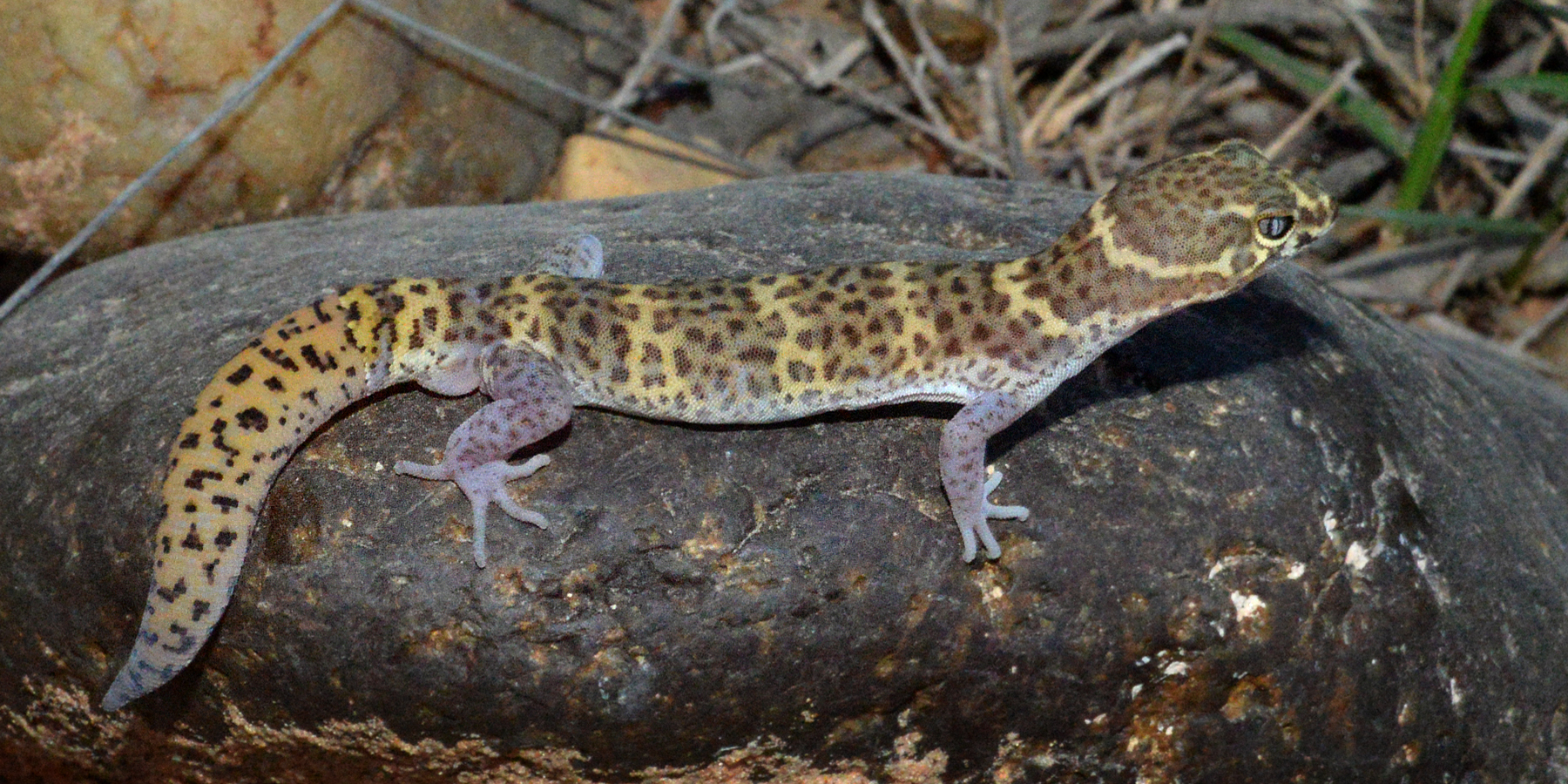
Texas Banded Gecko (Coleonyx brevis), Webb County Texas, USA (10 June 2016).

Coleonyx is a genus of terrestrial geckos commonly referred to as banded geckos. Species of Coleonyx are found in the southwestern United States, Mexico, and Central America. Most banded Geckos enjoy dry, warm weather which is why they are typically found in the Peninsular Desert. Some, however, prefer humid forests. They are relatively small lizards, measuring about 5–6 in (13–15 cm) inches in total length (including tail). They are nocturnal and are found primarily in dry, rocky habitats. Banded Geckos are often preyed upon by snakes, with their main predators being rattlesnakes and glossy snakes. Banded Geckos can decipher how they should react when they obtain a chemical cue based on their knowledge of the predator. Two main tactics they use to distract the predator are dropping their tail or escaping quickly. Banded Geckos possess heteromorphic euchromatic sex chromosomes which play a large role in their historical contingency.

== Species ==
- Coleonyx brevis (Stejneger, 1893) – Texas banded gecko
- Coleonyx cupreus Jones et al., 2026 – northern black banded gecko
- Coleonyx elegans – Yucatán banded gecko
  - Coleonyx elegans nemoralis (Klauber, 1945)
  - Coleonyx elegans elegans (Gray, 1845)
- Coleonyx fasciatus (Boulenger, 1885) – black banded gecko
- Coleonyx mitratus (Peters, 1863) – Central American banded gecko
- Coleonyx nemoralis Klauber, 1945
- Coleonyx reticulatus (Davis & Dixon, 1958) – reticulate banded gecko
- Coleonyx switaki (Murphy, 1974) – Switak's banded gecko
- Coleonyx tricinctus Jones et al., 2026
- Coleonyx gypsicolus (Grismer & Ottlery, 1988)
- Coleonyx variegatus Baird, 1858 – western banded gecko
  - Coleonyx variegatus abbotti (Klauber, 1945)
  - Coleonyx variegatus bogerti (Klauber, 1945)
  - Coleonyx variegatus peninsularis (Klauber, 1945)
  - Coleonyx variegatus slevini (Klauber, 1945)
  - Coleonyx variegatus sonoriensis (Klauber, 1945)
  - Coleonyx variegatus utahensis (Klauber, 1945)
  - Coleonyx variegatus variegatus (Baird, 1858)
