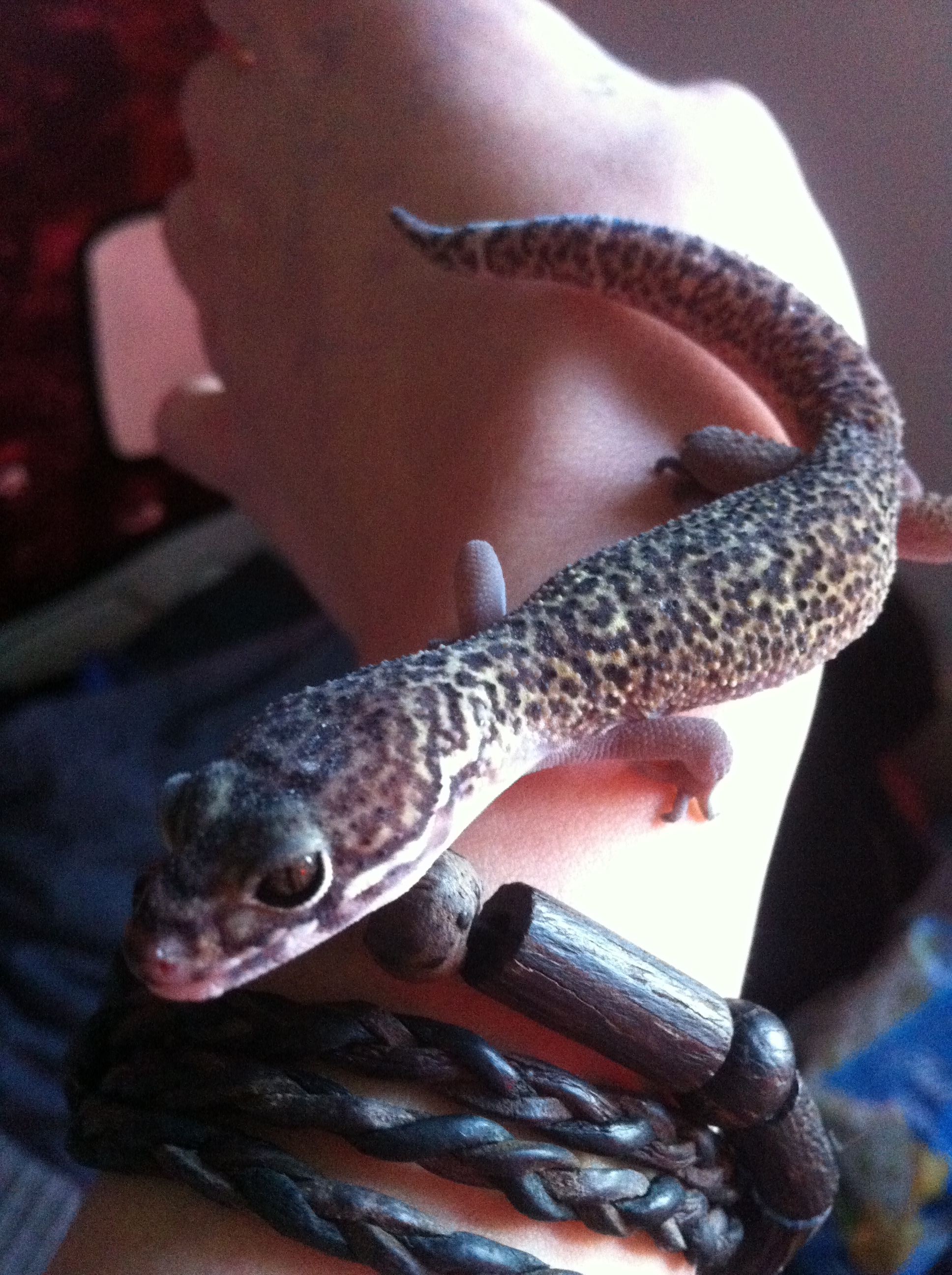

Conservation status
- Least Concern (IUCN 3.1)

Scientific classification
- Kingdom: Animalia
- Phylum: Chordata
- Class: Reptilia
- Order: Squamata
- Suborder: Gekkota
- Family: Eublepharidae
- Genus: Coleonyx
- Species: C. mitratus

Binomial name
- Coleonyx mitratus Peters, 1863

= Central American banded gecko =

Species of lizard

The Central American banded gecko (Coleonyx mitratus) is a species of moderately-sized gecko in the genus Coleonyx, native to Central America and first identified by Wilhelm Peters in 1863. It is a member of the eyelid geckos.

== Description ==
Length (including tail) reaches 190mm, with the tail encompassing 50-54% of the total. As indicated by their name, these geckos have brown, black and yellow horizontal bands on their dorsal surfaces.

== Biology ==
The Central American banded gecko is crepuscular and hides in a burrow in the soil during the day. It emerges at dusk to forage for insects. If threatened, like most geckos, it can lose its tail. Most will regenerate lost tails within a year.

== Distribution ==
These geckos are found from Guatemala south to Costa Rica.

== In captivity ==
Central American banded geckos are popular as pets.

== See also ==
- Lizards of Laguna de Apoyo Nature Reserve, Nicaragua
