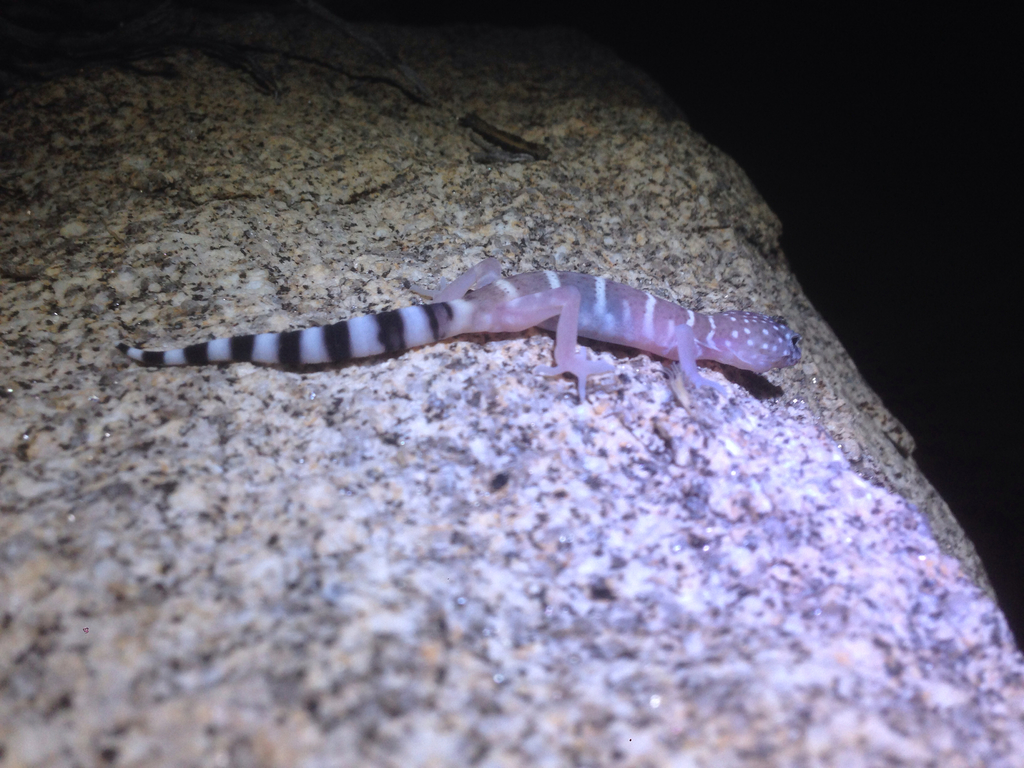

Conservation status
- Least Concern (IUCN 3.1)

Scientific classification
- Kingdom: Animalia
- Phylum: Chordata
- Class: Reptilia
- Order: Squamata
- Suborder: Gekkota
- Family: Eublepharidae
- Genus: Coleonyx
- Species: C. switaki

Binomial name
- Coleonyx switaki (R. Murphy, 1974)

Synonyms
- Anarbylus switaki R. Murphy, 1974; Coleonyx swaitaki [sic] Stebbins, 1985 (ex errore); Coleonyx switaki — Kluge, 1993

= Switak's banded gecko =

Species of lizard

Switak's banded gecko (Coleonyx switaki), also commonly known as the barefoot banded gecko, the barefoot gecko, and Switak's barefoot gecko, is a species of lizard in the family Eublepharidae. The species is indigenous to the extreme southwestern United States and adjacent northwestern Mexico.

== Etymology ==
The specific name, switaki, is in honor of German herpetologist Karl-Heinz Switak (born 1938).

== Geographic range ==
C. switaki is native to southern California in the United States and Baja California and Baja California Sur in Mexico.

== Habitat ==
The preferred natural habitats of C. switaki are desert and rocky areas. The California population of C. switaki tends to reside at elevations of approximately 200-600 meters in desert foothill areas, finding shelter in rock crevices and underground cavities in the terrain.

== Taxonomy ==
Coleonyx gypsicolus, which is endemic to Isla San Marcos in Mexico, is sometimes considered a subspecies of C. switaki.

== Description ==
In a 2024 study, researchers recorded an adult female C. switaki with the largest measurements among a sample of 203 individuals, with a snout-to-vent length (SVL) of 94 mm, a regenerated tail length of 43 mm, and a mass of 15 g. The body of C. switaki is covered in round brown spots. Despite one of its common names, Switak's banded gecko, C. switaki has a variable color pattern that may not feature bands. When compared to the population in Southern Baja California, the C. switaki population in California has both lighter coloration and a more slender body. The California C. switaki also possesses a pattern of transverse bars along its body.

== Physiology ==
In a 1982 study, researchers found that the standard metabolic rate (SMR) measured for a C. switaki lizard was 0.074 ml O_{2}/g hr, which is less than the predicted value of a lizard of this size. A 1992 phylogenetic study identified that low evaporative water-loss rate (EWLR) and high temperature preference (TP) were traits that evolved independently in the C. switaki species and another clade of lizards known to reside in dry environments.

== Reproduction ==
C. switaki is oviparous.
