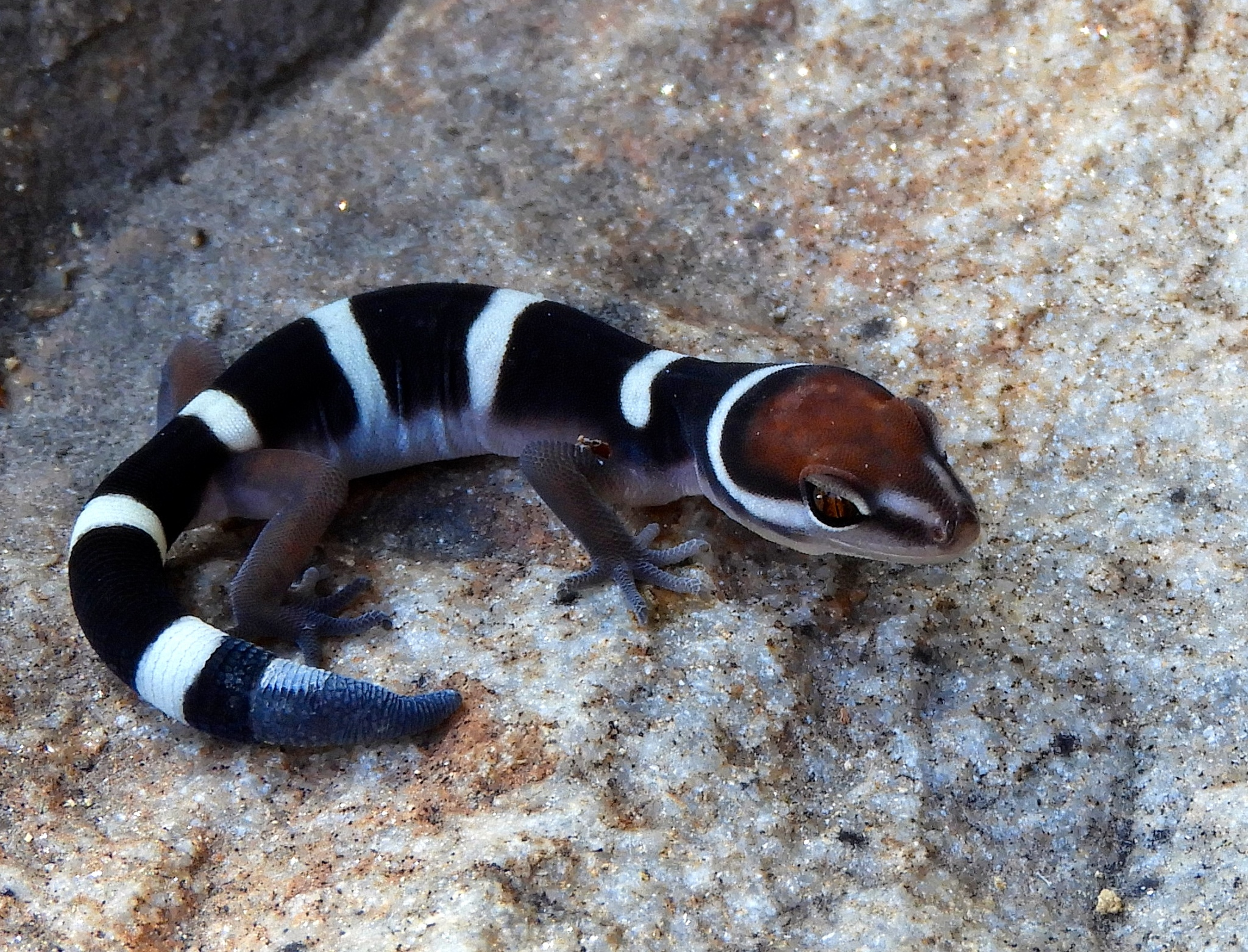

Conservation status
- Least Concern (IUCN 3.1)

Scientific classification
- Kingdom: Animalia
- Phylum: Chordata
- Class: Reptilia
- Order: Squamata
- Suborder: Gekkota
- Family: Eublepharidae
- Genus: Coleonyx
- Species: C. fasciatus

Binomial name
- Coleonyx fasciatus Boulenger, 1885

= Black banded gecko =

Species of lizard

The black banded gecko (Coleonyx fasciatus) is a gecko endemic to western Mexico. It is found in Madrean foothills in Sinaloa and southern Sonora, and perhaps in extreme adjacent southwestern Chihuahua.
