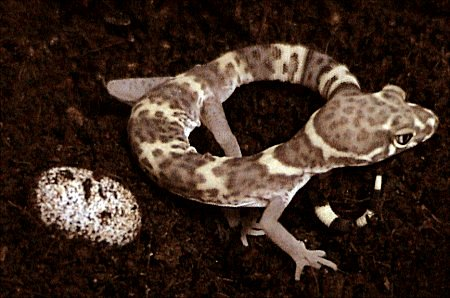
- Texas banded gecko, Coleonyx brevis, with egg

Conservation status
- Least Concern (IUCN 3.1)

Scientific classification
- Kingdom: Animalia
- Phylum: Chordata
- Class: Reptilia
- Order: Squamata
- Suborder: Gekkota
- Family: Eublepharidae
- Genus: Coleonyx
- Species: C. brevis

Binomial name
- Coleonyx brevis Stejneger, 1893

= Texas banded gecko =

Species of lizard

The Texas banded gecko (Coleonyx brevis) is a species of small gecko native to the southwestern United States and northern Mexico.

== Description ==
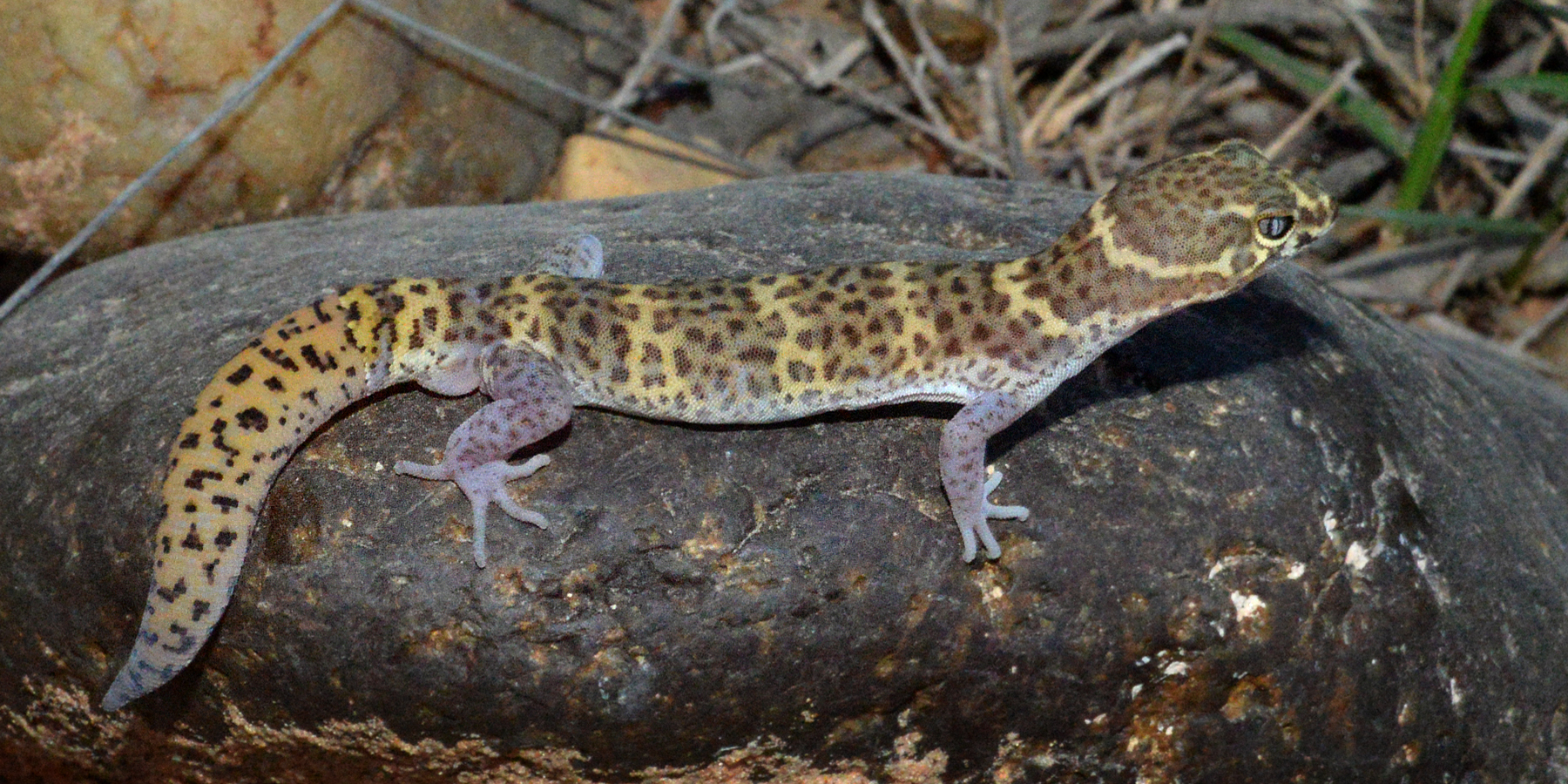
Texas Banded Gecko (Coleonyx brevis), Webb County Texas, USA (10 June 2016).

Texas banded geckos are small, terrestrial lizards, rarely exceeding 4 in (10 cm) in length. They have alternating bands of yellow and brown or pink colored banding down their body, generally with black accenting on the bands, and sometimes with varying degrees of black speckling. Hatchlings and juveniles display a banded pattern; the banded pattern gets a more mottled appearance as the gecko becomes an adult.

== Distribution ==
It is found in western Texas and in southeastern New Mexico in the United States, and in Chihuahua, Coahuila, Nuevo León, and Durango in Mexico. They prefer semi-arid habitats, and are often found around rock piles or canyon crevices.

== Behavior ==
Primarily nocturnal and carnivorous, they will consume almost any kind of small arthropods. They are capable of vocalizing, and sometimes emit squeaking noises, most often when harassed or handled. Reproduction occurs in the late spring, and they lay one or two eggs, which are surprisingly large compared to the size of the gecko.

== In captivity ==
Texas banded geckos are not frequently found in captivity, but due to their small size and docile nature, they can make good captives. They do not hold any particular conservation status.
