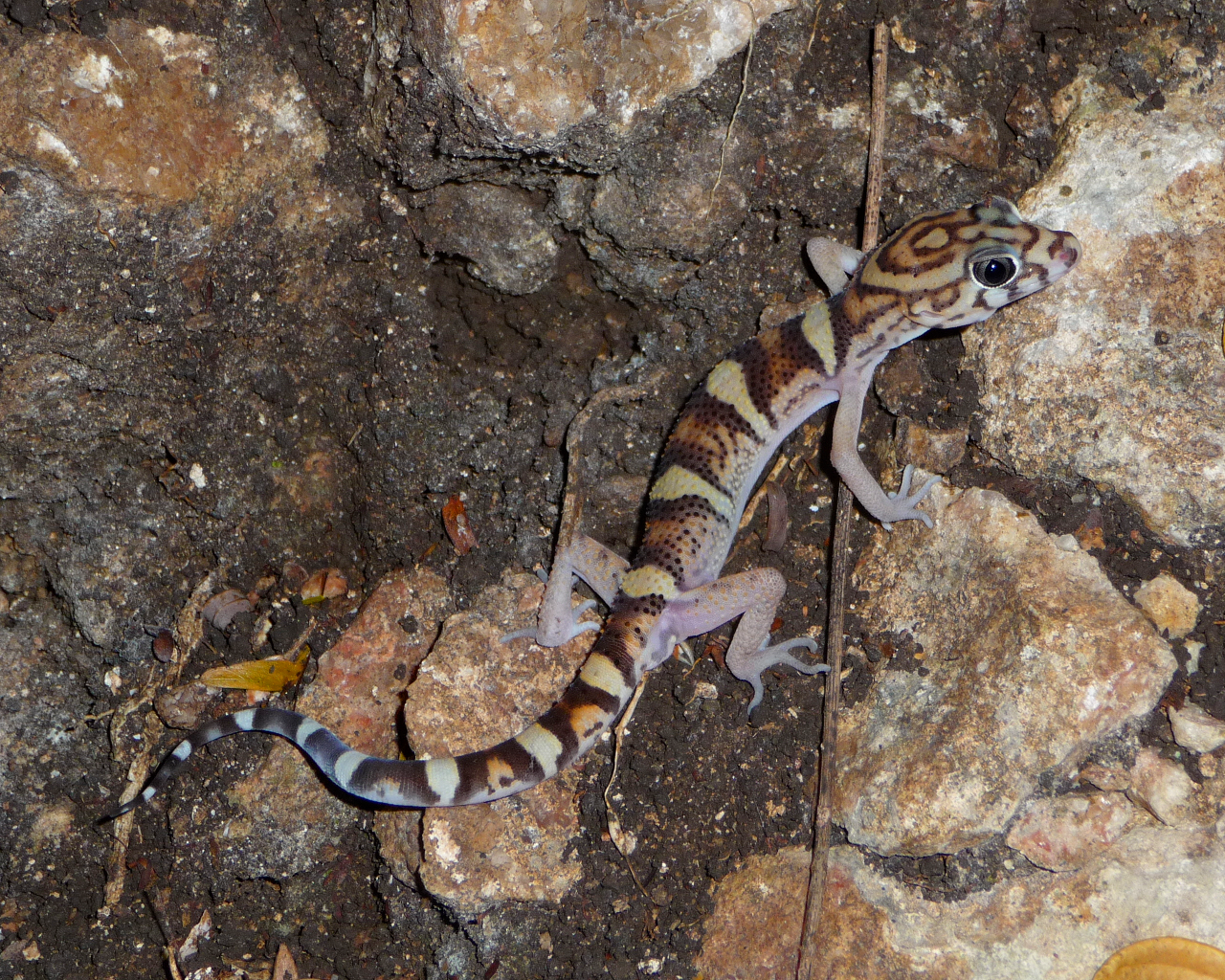

Conservation status
- Least Concern (IUCN 3.1)

Scientific classification
- Kingdom: Animalia
- Phylum: Chordata
- Class: Reptilia
- Order: Squamata
- Suborder: Gekkota
- Family: Eublepharidae
- Genus: Coleonyx
- Species: C. elegans

Binomial name
- Coleonyx elegans Gray, 1845

Subspecies
- Coleonyx elegans elegans (Gray, 1845); Coleonyx elegans nemoralis (Klauber, 1945)

= Yucatán banded gecko =

Species of lizard

The Yucatán banded gecko (Coleonyx elegans) is a species of geckos found in Mexico, Guatemala, El Salvador and Belize.

It is a common inhabitant of forested and open habitats throughout Yucatan Peninsula. It is terrestrial and largely nocturnal. It feeds on invertebrates, including spiders, crickets and beetles, and is non venomous and harmless, despite being highly feared and avoided by many locals.
