= Lygodactylus heeneni =

Scientific classification
- Domain: Eukaryota
- Kingdom: Animalia
- Phylum: Chordata
- Class: Reptilia
- Order: Squamata
- Infraorder: Gekkota
- Family: Gekkonidae
- Genus: Lygodactylus
- Species: L. heeneni

Binomial name
- Lygodactylus heeneni De Witte, 1933

Species of lizard

Lygodactylus heeneni is a species of gecko found in Zaire and Zambia. It has also been classified as a subspecies of angulated dwarf gecko.
