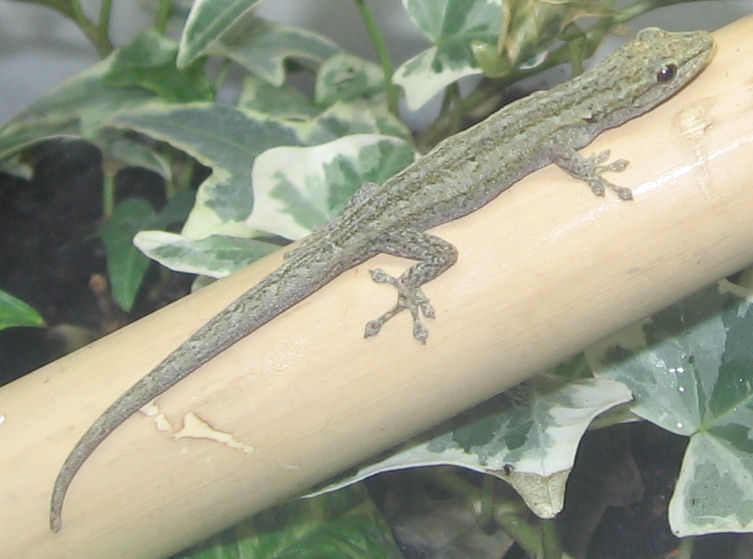

Scientific classification
- Domain: Eukaryota
- Kingdom: Animalia
- Phylum: Chordata
- Class: Reptilia
- Order: Squamata
- Infraorder: Gekkota
- Family: Gekkonidae
- Genus: Lygodactylus
- Species: L. angularis

Binomial name
- Lygodactylus angularis Günther, 1893

= Angulated dwarf gecko =

Species of lizard

The angulated dwarf gecko (Lygodactylus angularis) is a species of gecko native to southern Zaire and Tanzania. The Tanzanian subspecies is Lygodactylus angularis grzimek, and the Zairean subspecies is Lygodactylus angularis heeneni .
