= Kenya dwarf gecko =

Kenya dwarf gecko could refer to the following species:

- Lygodactylus keniensis, also known as Parker's dwarf gecko
- Lygodactylus grandisonae, also known as Grandison's dwarf gecko or Bunty's dwarf gecko
