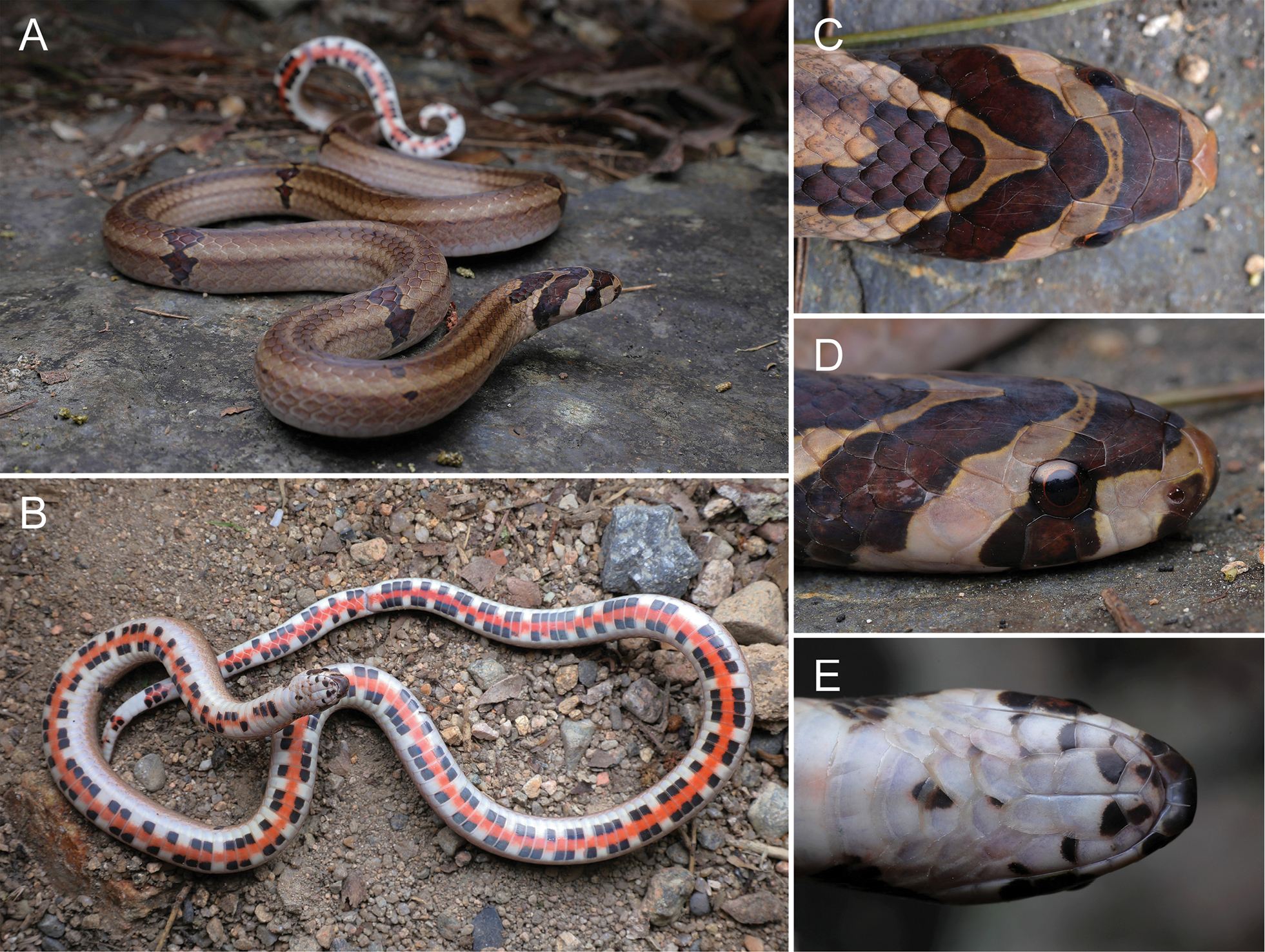
- Male from Wuyi Mountains, China. A. Dorsolateral view; B. Ventral view; C. Dorsal view of the head; D. Lateral view of the head; E. Ventral view of the head.

Conservation status
- Least Concern (IUCN 3.1)

Scientific classification
- Kingdom: Animalia
- Phylum: Chordata
- Class: Reptilia
- Order: Squamata
- Suborder: Serpentes
- Family: Colubridae
- Genus: Oligodon
- Species: O. ornatus

Binomial name
- Oligodon ornatus Van Denburgh, 1909

= Oligodon ornatus =

Species of snake

Oligodon ornatus, also known as the ornate kukri snake, is a species of snake of the family Colubridae.

== Geographic range and habitat ==
The snake is found in Taiwan and China. Recent taxonomic work restricts its range in China to the eastern and southern parts of the country; earlier records from Sicuan represent Oligodon lungshenensis and the record from Hainan might repsent Oligodon bivirgatus. It occurs at elevations of 200–1,200 m (660–3,940 ft) above sea level in agricultural areas, bamboo forests, and broadleaf forests.

== Description ==
Adult Oligodon ornatus measure 292–559 mm (11.5–22.0 in) in snout–vent length; the tail is 51–95 mm (2.0–3.7 in). They are slender snakes with an elongate head that is slightly distinct from the body. The tail tapers to sharp pointed tip. Colouration is dorsally light brown, with brown-coloured broad paravertebral stripes and narrower lateral stripes on each side of body, extending from nape to tail. The head has distinct dark brown or reddish brown markings.
