= Bleeker's kukri snake =

There are two species of snake named Bleeker's kukri snake:

- Oligodon propinquus
- Oligodon waandersi
