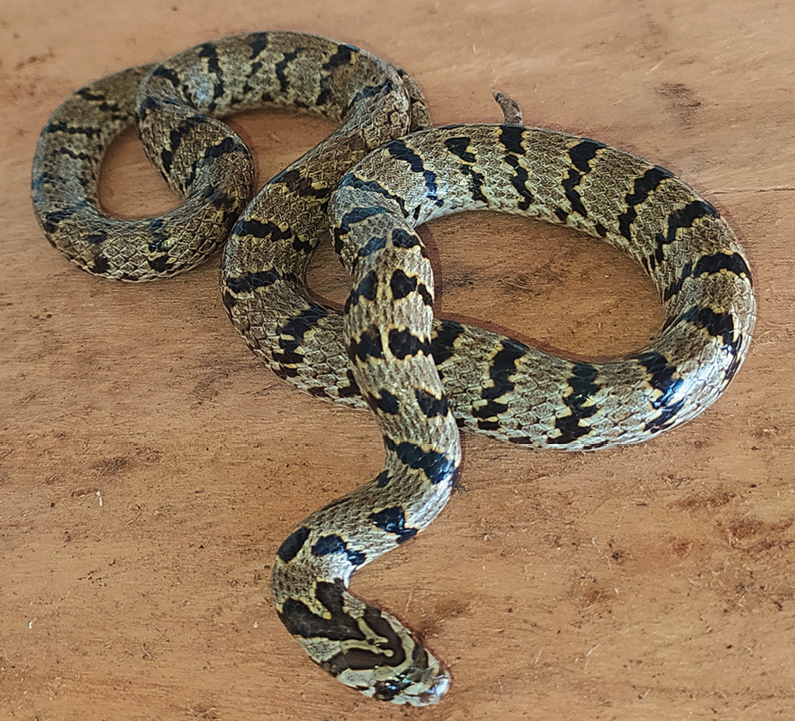
- Female

Scientific classification
- Kingdom: Animalia
- Phylum: Chordata
- Class: Reptilia
- Order: Squamata
- Suborder: Serpentes
- Family: Colubridae
- Genus: Oligodon
- Species: O. churahensis

Binomial name
- Oligodon churahensis Mirza, Bhardwaj, and Patel, 2021

= Oligodon churahensis =

Species of snake from India

Oligodon churahensis, the Churah Valley kukri snake, is a species of snake in the family Colubridae. It was discovered when a photo of it was posted in Instagram and noticed by two biologists, leading to them contacting the poster and collecting specimens of the species. It is known only from the state of Himachal Pradesh in India. The common and specific name both refer to the Churah Valley, where it was discovered.

== Taxonomy ==
The Churah Valley kukri snake was first photographed by Virender Bhardwaj, an Indian graduate student. During the COVID-19 pandemic, Bhardwaj began exploring his hometown, Chamba, Himachal Pradesh, and posting photos of what he found on Instagram. When he posted a photo of a kukri snake in June 2020, the biologists Zeeshan Mirza and Harshil Patel saw it and thought that it might be of an undescribed species. They contacted Bhardwaj, and a female holotype and a male paratype of the species were subsequently collected from near the village of Thanei Kothi in the Churah Valley on June 22 and June 25, respectively. The researchers concluded that the specimens represented a distinct species on the basis of DNA analysis and morphology, and described it as Oligodon churahensis. The specific name is a metonym after the Churah Valley, where the types of the species were collected.

The Churah Valley kukri snake is one of over 80 species in the kukri snake genus Oligodon, and is most closely related to the banded kukri snake (O. arnensis).

== Description ==
The Churah Valley kukri snake is a medium-sized Oligodon, with a snout–vent length of 275 mm (10.8 in) and 17 rows of dorsal scales at the middle of the body. It has seven supralabial scales, out of which the third and fourth touch the eye. The loreal scale is present. It has 170–175 ventral scales, which are yellow with brown smearing on their edges, and 46–47 subcaudal scales. The pattern on the dorsum (underside of the body) consists of black bands that are 1–2 dorsal scales wide and edged with yellow. It has a total of 48–54 bands. The hemipenis is forked and spiny all over.

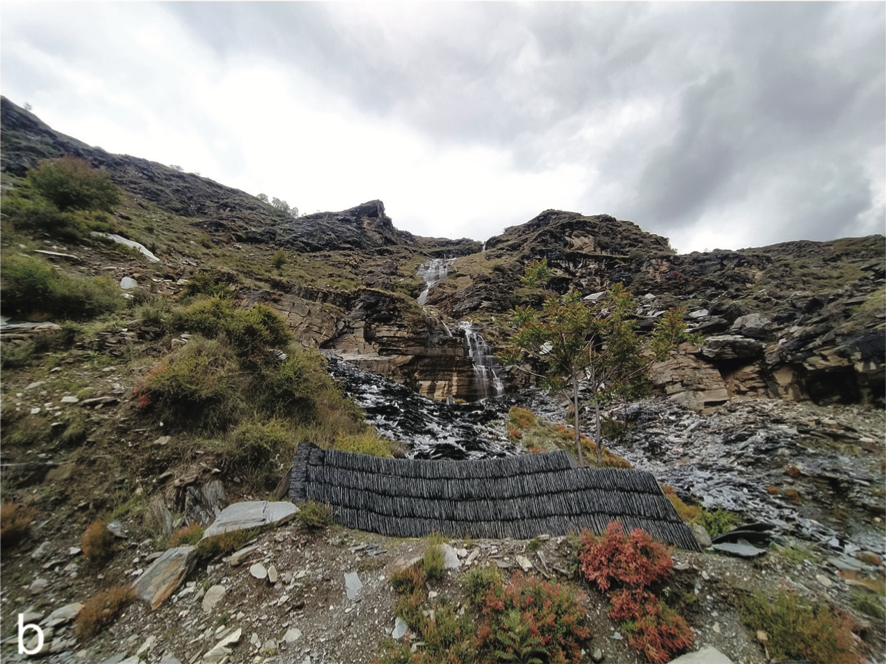
Habitat at the type locality of the Churah Valley kukri snake

== Distribution ==
The species is known only from the Churah Valley in Himachal Pradesh.
