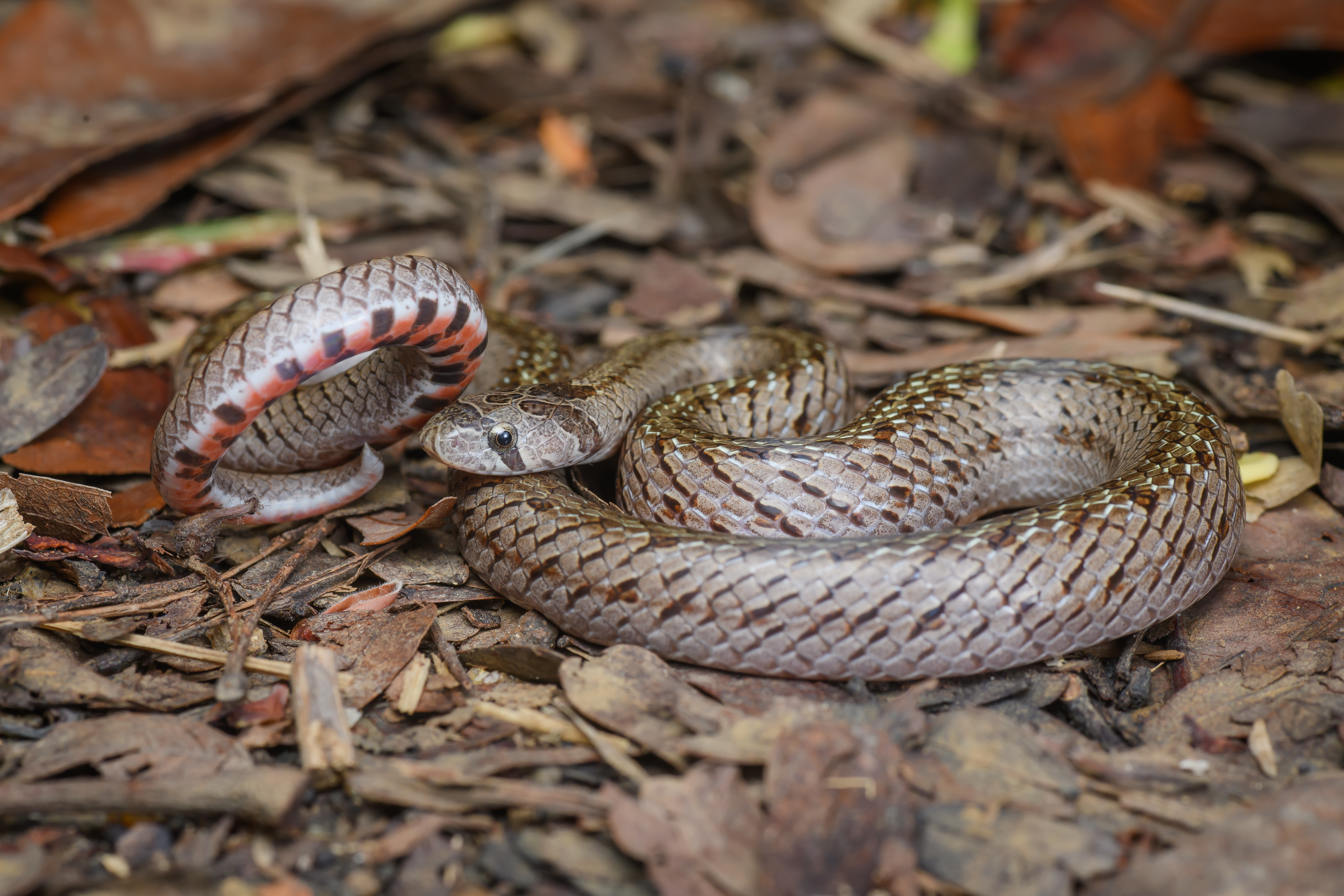

Conservation status
- Least Concern (IUCN 3.1)

Scientific classification
- Kingdom: Animalia
- Phylum: Chordata
- Class: Reptilia
- Order: Squamata
- Suborder: Serpentes
- Family: Colubridae
- Genus: Oligodon
- Species: O. deuvei

Binomial name
- Oligodon deuvei David, Vogel & van Rooijen, 2008

= Oligodon deuvei =

Species of snake

Oligodon deuvei is a species of snake in the family Colubridae. The species is endemic to Southeast Asia.

== Etymology ==
The specific name, deuvei, is in honor of Jean Deuve (1918–2008) who was a French military officer and amateur naturalist.

== Geographic range ==
O. deuvei is found in Cambodia, southern Vietnam, and Laos; it is expected to occur in northeastern Thailand.

== Habitat ==
The preferred natural habitat of O. deuvei is forest, but it is also found in gardens.

== Description ==
O. deuvei differs from other known species of its group (the O. taeniatus group) by the combination of 12–15 maxillary teeth, 17 dorsal scale rows at midbody, approximately seven supralabials, the absence of dorsal and tail blotches, and the presence of a single vertebral black stripe, which is usually orange or red. O. deuvei is most similar to O. barroni, but differs from the latter by having more maxillary teeth and its absence of dorsal and tail marks.

== Behavior ==
O. deuvei is terrestrial, semiaquatic, crepuscular and diurnal.

== Diet ==
O. deuvei preys predominately upon frogs and tadpoles.

== Reproduction ==
The mode of reproduction of O. deuvei is unknown.
