= Oligodon condaoensis =

Scientific classification
- Kingdom: Animalia
- Phylum: Chordata
- Class: Reptilia
- Order: Squamata
- Suborder: Serpentes
- Family: Colubridae
- Genus: Oligodon
- Species: O. condaoensis

Binomial name
- Oligodon condaoensis S.N. Nguyen, V.D.H. Nguyen, S.H. Le & R. Murphy, 2016

Species of snake

Oligodon condaoensis is a species of snakes in the subfamily Colubrinae. It is found in Vietnam.
