= Oligodon praefrontalis =

Conservation status
- Data Deficient (IUCN 3.1)

Scientific classification
- Kingdom: Animalia
- Phylum: Chordata
- Class: Reptilia
- Order: Squamata
- Suborder: Serpentes
- Family: Colubridae
- Genus: Oligodon
- Species: O. praefrontalis

Binomial name
- Oligodon praefrontalis Werner, 1913

Species of snake

Oligodon praefrontalis, the Pulau Weh kukri snake, is a species of snake of the family Colubridae.

The snake is found in Indonesia.
