= Oligodon forbesi =

Conservation status
- Near Threatened (IUCN 3.1)

Scientific classification
- Kingdom: Animalia
- Phylum: Chordata
- Class: Reptilia
- Order: Squamata
- Suborder: Serpentes
- Family: Colubridae
- Genus: Oligodon
- Species: O. forbesi

Binomial name
- Oligodon forbesi (Boulenger, 1883)

Species of snake

Oligodon forbesi, Forbes's kukri snake, is a species of snakes in the subfamily Colubrinae. It is found in Indonesia.
