= Oligodon annamensis =

Conservation status
- Data Deficient (IUCN 3.1)

Scientific classification
- Kingdom: Animalia
- Phylum: Chordata
- Class: Reptilia
- Order: Squamata
- Suborder: Serpentes
- Family: Colubridae
- Genus: Oligodon
- Species: O. annamensis

Binomial name
- Oligodon annamensis Leviton, 1953

Species of snake

Oligodon annamensis, commonly known as the Annam kukri snake or Leviton's kukri snake, is a species of colubrid snake originally known from two specimens from Vietnam, where it was thought to be endemic. It has also since been found in Cambodia and Thailand.

== Etymology ==
The species name annamensis is derived from "Annam," the name given to the French protectorate in central Vietnam, prior to that country's independence, where the holotype was collected.

== Phylogeny ==
Oligodon annamensis is a member of the genus Oligodon, a genus common throughout central and tropical Asia. The genus belongs to the snake family Colubridae, the largest snake family, with member species being found on every continent except Antarctica.

== Description ==
The head of the snake is short and rounded, with the snout being slightly longer than it was broad. The eyes are moderately large, with round pupils. A holotype for the species was 24.9 cm in total length, with a 2.9 cm tail. The back and head of the snake are light brown, with white blotches that are edged in black. The underside is white.

== Habitat and ecology ==
The habitat and ecology of this species is poorly known. Based on data for other members of Oligodon, O. annamensis is thought to be oviparous, or egg-laying, and terrestrial in its habits.

== Distribution ==
The species is known only from 5 specimens, and so its distribution is poorly understood. The holotype was collected from central Vietnam, and another specimen from Lam Dang province. The species was thought to be endemic to Vietnam, but has also since been recorded from the Cardamom Mountains of Cambodia, and another specimen was collected from Thailand's Chanthaburi province in 1987 (though not identified until 2022).

== Conservation ==
The conservation threats to O. annamensis are not known, because the species is only known from two specimens. The area from which these are collected is not under any sort of protection, and is threatened by deforestation.
