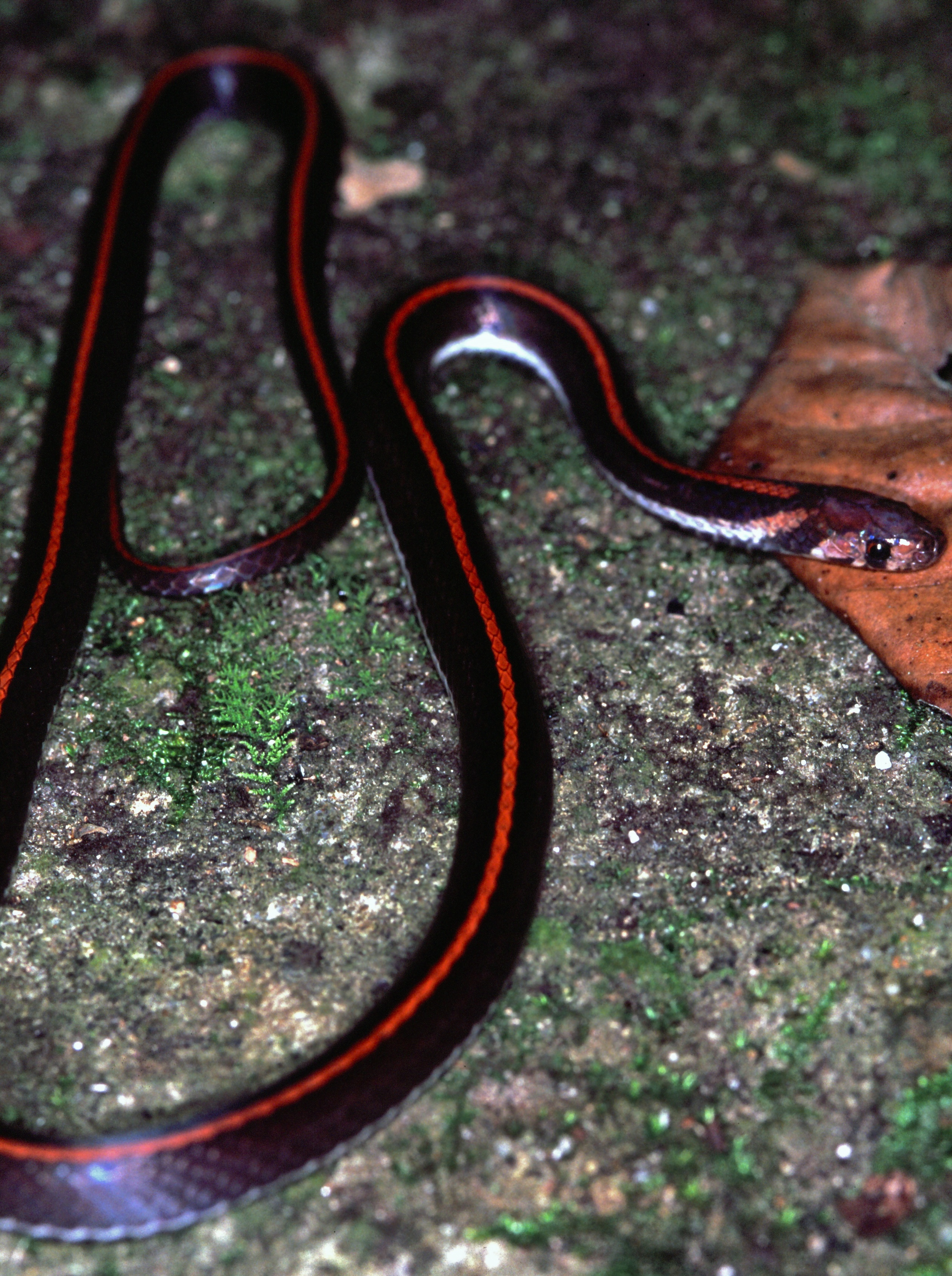

Conservation status
- Least Concern (IUCN 3.1)

Scientific classification
- Kingdom: Animalia
- Phylum: Chordata
- Class: Reptilia
- Order: Squamata
- Suborder: Serpentes
- Family: Colubridae
- Genus: Oligodon
- Species: O. trilineatus

Binomial name
- Oligodon trilineatus (Duméril, Bibron & Duméril, 1854)

= Three-lined kukri snake =

Species of snake

The three-lined kukri snake (Oligodon trilineatus) is a species of snake of the family Colubridae.

== Geographic range ==
The snake is found in Indonesia. Specifically, it is widespread in the mainland and islands of Sumatra.
