= Oligodon juglandifer =

Walnut kukri snake

Conservation status
- Vulnerable (IUCN 3.1)

Scientific classification
- Kingdom: Animalia
- Phylum: Chordata
- Class: Reptilia
- Order: Squamata
- Suborder: Serpentes
- Family: Colubridae
- Genus: Oligodon
- Species: O. juglandifer

Binomial name
- Oligodon juglandifer (Wall, 1909)

Species of snake

Oligodon juglandifer, the walnut kukri snake, is a species of snake found in northeastern India.

== Bibliography ==
- Smith, M.A. 1943 The Fauna of British India, Ceylon and Burma, Including the Whole of the Indo-Chinese Sub-Region. Reptilia and Amphibia. 3 (Serpentes). Taylor and Francis, London. 583 pp.
- Wall, F. 1909 Notes on snakes from the neighbourhood of Darjeeling. J. Bombay nat. Hist. Soc. 19 : 337–357
