= Oligodon erythrogaster =

Nagarkot kukri snake

Conservation status
- Near Threatened (IUCN 3.1)

Scientific classification
- Kingdom: Animalia
- Phylum: Chordata
- Class: Reptilia
- Order: Squamata
- Suborder: Serpentes
- Family: Colubridae
- Genus: Oligodon
- Species: O. erythrogaster

Binomial name
- Oligodon erythrogaster Boulenger, 1907

Species of snake

Oligodon erythrogaster, the Nagarkot kukri snake, is a species of snake found in India and Nepal.
