= Oligodon melaneus =

Bluebelly kukri snake

Conservation status
- Data Deficient (IUCN 3.1)

Scientific classification
- Kingdom: Animalia
- Phylum: Chordata
- Class: Reptilia
- Order: Squamata
- Suborder: Serpentes
- Family: Colubridae
- Genus: Oligodon
- Species: O. melaneus

Binomial name
- Oligodon melaneus Wall, 1909

Species of snake

Oligodon melaneus, the: bluebelly kukri snake is a species of snake in the family Colubridae. It is endemic to eastern India. It was described in 1909 by Frank Wall based on two specimens from Tindharia, Darjeeling.

== Description ==
One the types is a female, 30 cm (13.125 in) in total length, with the tail being 4 cm (1.75 in). It was gravid with four eggs. The other type is a male, similar in length to the female. The body is uniformly black above, grading to grayish in the flanks. The belly is blue-grey, with black speckling in the female.
