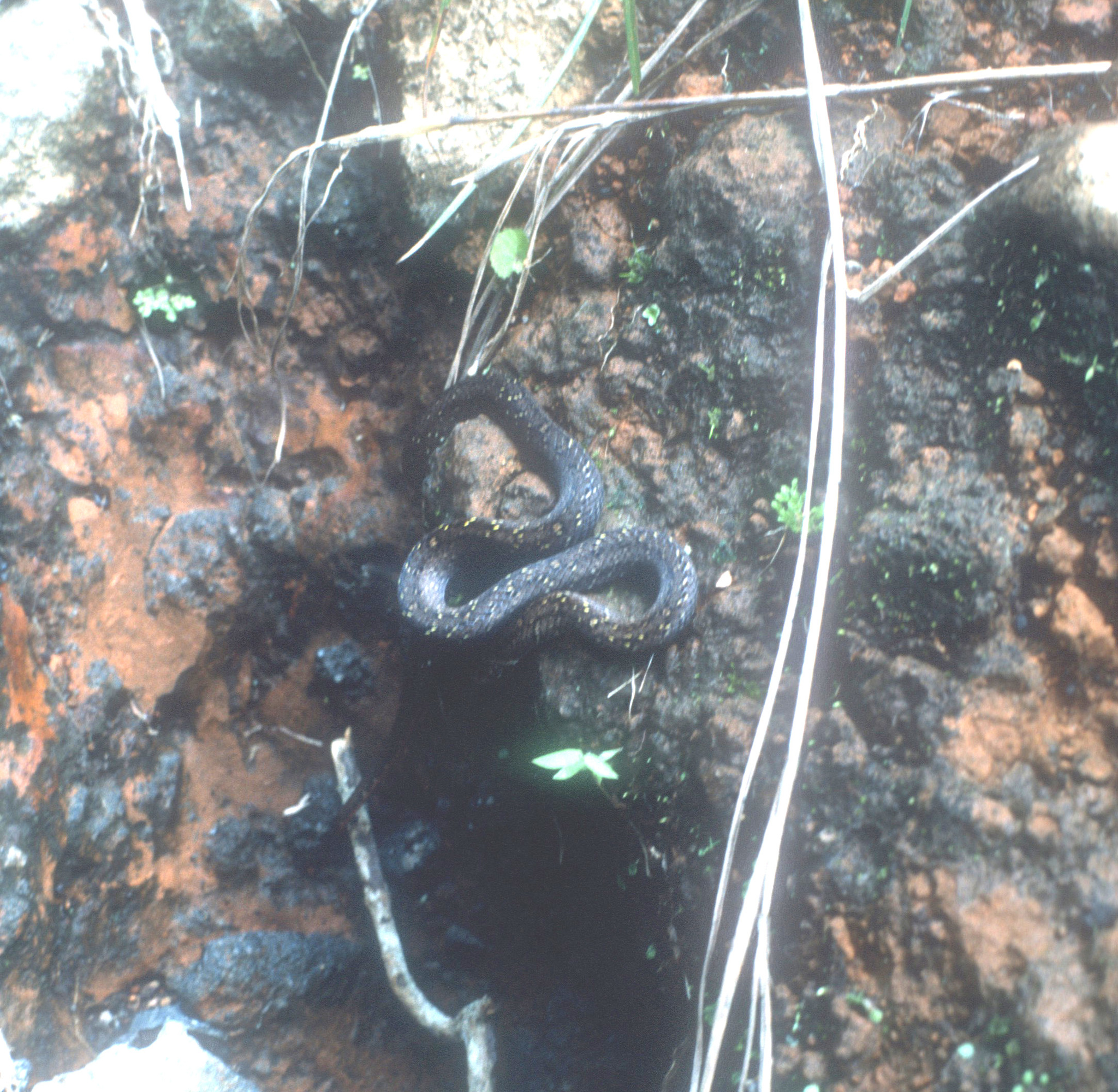

Conservation status
- Least Concern (IUCN 3.1)

Scientific classification
- Kingdom: Animalia
- Phylum: Chordata
- Class: Reptilia
- Order: Squamata
- Suborder: Serpentes
- Family: Colubridae
- Genus: Oligodon
- Species: O. bitorquatus

Binomial name
- Oligodon bitorquatus Boie, 1827

= Oligodon bitorquatus =

Species of snake

Oligodon bitorquatus, Boie's kukri snake, is a species of snake of the family Colubridae.

== Geographic range ==
The snake is found in Indonesia.
