= Oligodon torquatus =

Conservation status
- Data Deficient (IUCN 3.1)

Scientific classification
- Kingdom: Animalia
- Phylum: Chordata
- Class: Reptilia
- Order: Squamata
- Suborder: Serpentes
- Family: Colubridae
- Genus: Oligodon
- Species: O. torquatus

Binomial name
- Oligodon torquatus (Boulenger, 1888)

Species of snake

Oligodon torquatus is a species of snake of the family Colubridae.

The snake is found in Myanmar.
