= Oligodon everetti =

Conservation status
- Least Concern (IUCN 3.1)

Scientific classification
- Kingdom: Animalia
- Phylum: Chordata
- Class: Reptilia
- Order: Squamata
- Suborder: Serpentes
- Family: Colubridae
- Genus: Oligodon
- Species: O. everetti

Binomial name
- Oligodon everetti Boulenger, 1893

Species of snake

Oligodon everetti, Everett's kukri snake or jewelled kukri snake, is a species of snakes in the subfamily Colubrinae. It is found in Malaysia and Indonesia.
