= Oligodon pulcherrimus =

Conservation status
- Vulnerable (IUCN 3.1)

Scientific classification
- Kingdom: Animalia
- Phylum: Chordata
- Class: Reptilia
- Order: Squamata
- Suborder: Serpentes
- Family: Colubridae
- Genus: Oligodon
- Species: O. pulcherrimus

Binomial name
- Oligodon pulcherrimus Werner, 1909

Species of snake

Oligodon pulcherrimus is a species of snake of the family Colubridae.

The snake is found on Sumatra in Indonesia.
