= Oligodon melanozonatus =

Abor Hills kukri snake

Conservation status
- Data Deficient (IUCN 3.1)

Scientific classification
- Kingdom: Animalia
- Phylum: Chordata
- Class: Reptilia
- Order: Squamata
- Suborder: Serpentes
- Family: Colubridae
- Genus: Oligodon
- Species: O. melanozonatus

Binomial name
- Oligodon melanozonatus Wall, 1922

Synonyms
- Oligodon melanozonotus – erroneous spelling

Species of snake

Oligodon melanozonatus, also known as the Abor Hills kukri snake, is a species of snake found in Arunachal Pradesh in Northeast India and Tibet in Southwest China.
