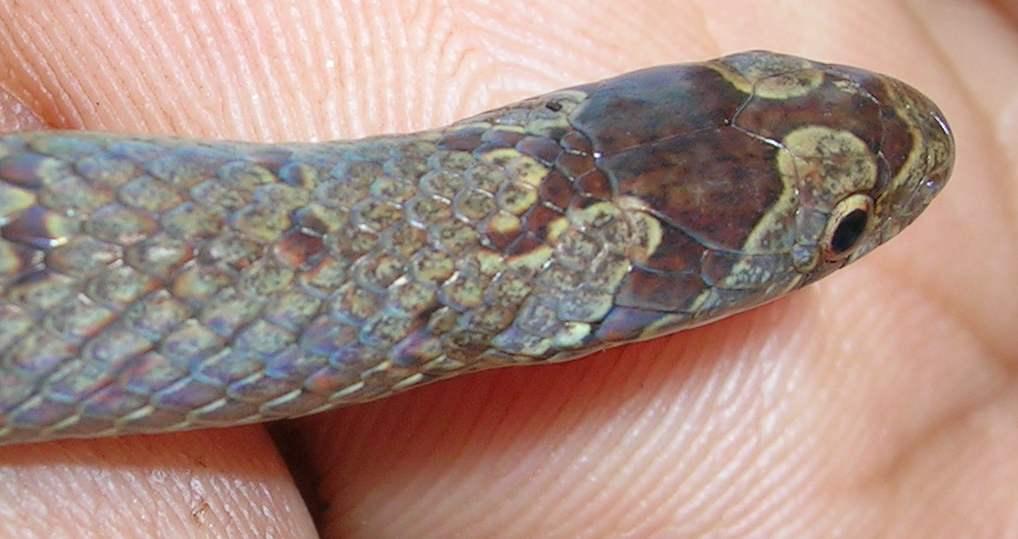
- Western kukri snake (Oligodon affinis)

Scientific classification
- Kingdom: Animalia
- Phylum: Chordata
- Class: Reptilia
- Order: Squamata
- Suborder: Serpentes
- Family: Colubridae
- Subfamily: Colubrinae
- Genus: Oligodon; Fitzinger, 1826

Type species
- Oligodon bitorquatus

Species
- 91 known species

= Oligodon =

Genus of snakes

Oligodon is genus of colubrid snakes that was first described by Austrian zoologist Leopold Fitzinger in 1826. This genus is widespread throughout central and tropical Asia. The snakes of this genus are commonly known as kukri snakes.

== Description ==
The species in the genus Oligodon are egg eaters and are usually under 90 cm (35 in) in total length (including tail). Different species display widely variable patterns and colorations. They subsist mostly by scavenging the eggs of birds and reptiles. Besides eggs, species of this genus also feeds on lizards, frogs, and small rodents.

Oligodon is a rear-fanged snake genus. All member species have a set of enlarged teeth placed in the back of the upper jaws, as well as functional Duvernoy's glands. They are not dangerous to humans, though. Bites by some species have been reported to bleed excessively, suggesting presence of anticoagulants in the Duvernoy's gland secretions. Species of Oligodon are mostly nocturnal, and live on the floor of mature forests.

The common name of the genus comes from the kukri, a distinctively shaped Nepalese knife, which is similar in shape to the broad, flattened, curved hind teeth of Oligodon species. These teeth are specially adapted for their main diet of eggs; the teeth cut open eggs as they are being swallowed by the snake, allowing for easier digestion.

At least three species (O. fasciolatus, O. formosanus and O. ocellatus) will slice open the abdomens of frogs and toads and devour their internal organs, before finally swallowing the prey whole (if the prey is not too large to be swallowed). That toads can be swallowed whole suggests that at least some species are immune to toad bufotoxin.

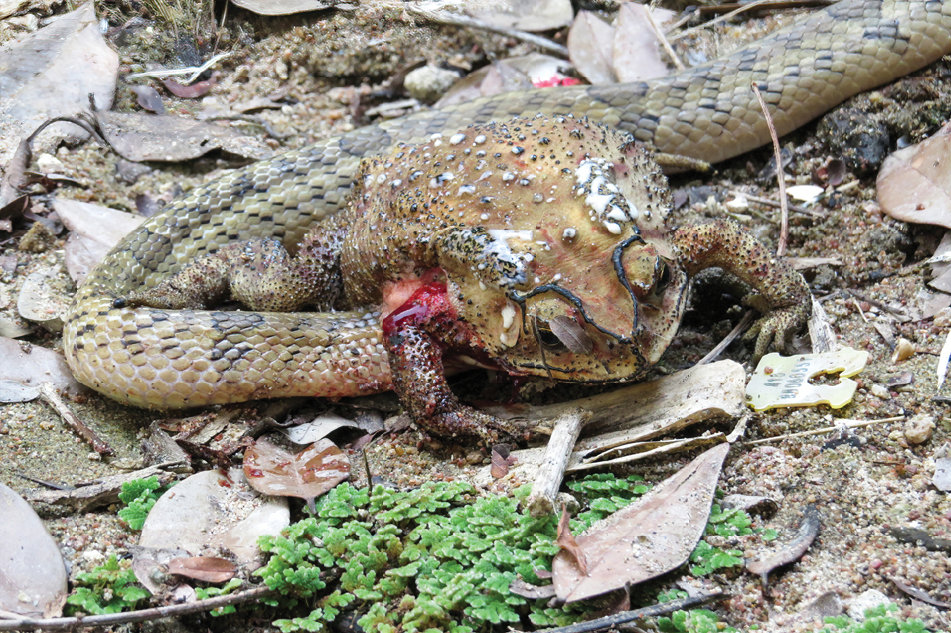
O. fasciolatus eating Asian common toad

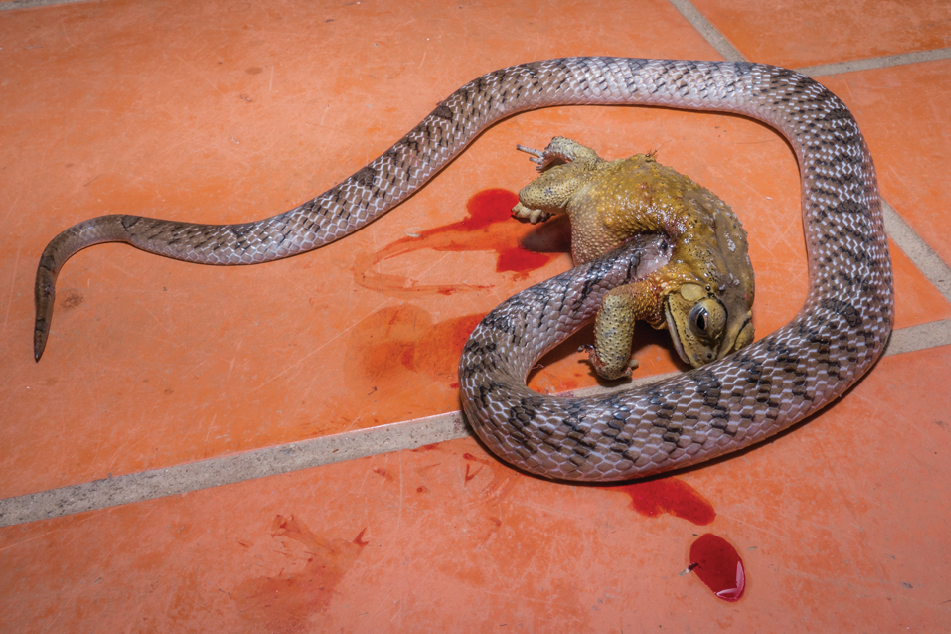
O. ocellatus eating an Asian common toad.

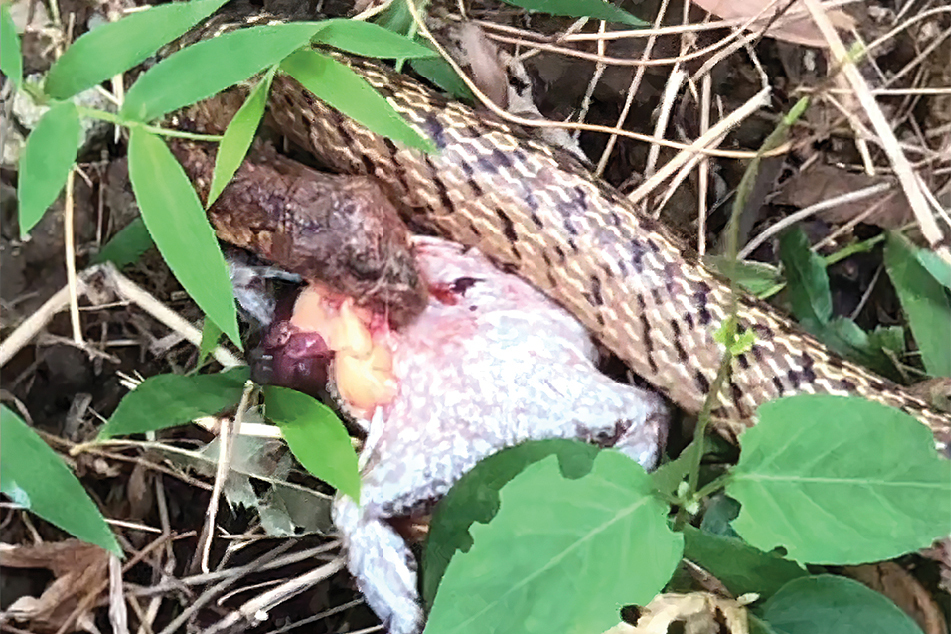
O. formosanus eating a banded bullfrog

== Species ==
There are 91 recognized species in the genus Oligodon according to the Reptile Database as of October 2025.

The source column gives direct links to the sources used:

- IUCN description of species at International Union for Conservation of Nature Red List of Threatened Species. IUCN Red List categories are:

EX - Extinct, EW - Extinct in the Wild
CR - Critically Endangered, EN - Endangered, VU - Vulnerable
NT - Near Threatened, LC - Least Concern
DD - Data Deficient, NE - Not Evaluated

- RDB description of species at Reptile Database.

Nota bene: A binomial authority in parentheses indicates that the species was originally described in a genus other than Oligodon.

Image	Common name	Species	Geographic range	Status	Source
	Western kukri snake, Malabar brown kukri snake	O. affinis Günther, 1862	India (Kerala, Tamil Nadu)	LC	IUCN RDB
	Light-barred kukri snake	O. albocinctus (Cantor, 1839)	Nepal, Bangladesh, India (Assam, Sikkim, Arunachal Pradesh), Myanmar, Vietnam, China (Tibet, Yunnan)		RDB
	Northern short-headed snake	O. ancorus (Girard, 1858)	Philippines (Mindoro, Luzon)	NT	IUCN RDB
	Annam kukri snake	O. annamensis Leviton, 1953	Vietnam (Lam Dang Province)	DD	IUCN RDB
	Spotted kukri snake, ringed kukri snake	O. annulifer (Boulenger, 1893)	Brunei, Malaysia (Sabah, Sarawak)	LC	IUCN RDB
	Russet kukri snake, common kukri snake, banded kukri	O. arnensis (Shaw, 1802)	Bangladesh, Sri Lanka, India (West Bengal, Kerala, Tamil Nadu, Karnataka, Andhra Pradesh, Gujarat, Madhya Pradesh, Uttar Pradesh, Himachal Pradesh, Maharashtra, Punjab), Pakistan, Nepal		RDB
	Barron's kukri snake	O. barroni (M.A. Smith, 1916)	Thailand, Southern Vietnam, Cambodia, South Laos	LC	IUCN RDB
	Javanese mountain kukri snake, Boie's kukri snake	O. bitorquatus F. Boie, 1827	Indonesia (Java, possibly South Sumatra and Sumbawa)	LC	IUCN RDB
	Double-striped kukri snake	O. bivirgatus T. Qian, S. Qi, J. Shi, Y. Lu, R.W. Jenkins, Y. Mo & P. Li, 2021	China (Hainan)		RDB
	Boo-Liat's kukri snake	O. booliati Leong & Grismer, 2004	Malaysia (Tioman island)	CR	IUCN RDB
	Short-tailed kukri snake, shorthead kukri snake	O. brevicauda Günther, 1862	India (Tamil Nadu, Kerala)	VU	IUCN RDB
	Templeton's kukri snake	O. calamarius (Linnaeus, 1758)	Sri Lanka	EN	RDB
	Assam kukri snake	O. catenatus (Blyth, 1854)	India, Myanmar, Thailand, Vietnam, Cambodia, South China (Guangdong, Guangxi)		RDB
	Chinese kukri snake	O. chinensis (Günther, 1888)	southern China, northern Vietnam	LC	IUCN RDB
	Churah Valley kukri snake	O. churahensis Mirza, Bhardwaj & Patel, 2021	India (Himachal Pradesh)		
	Cicada-eating kukri snake	O. cicadophagus Pauwels, Donbundit, Sumontha & Meesook, 2025	Thailand		
	Black cross-barred kukri snake, ashy kukri snake, golden kukri snake, Günther's kukri snake	O. cinereus (Günther, 1864)	India (Assam, Arunachal Pradesh), Bangladesh, Cambodia, Laos, Vietnam, Myanmar, Thailand, peninsular Malaysia, China (Yunnan, Hong Kong, Hainan, Guangxi, Fujian, Guangdong)	LC	IUCN RDB
		O. condaoensis S.N. Nguyen, V.D.H. Nguyen, S.H. Le & R. Murphy, 2016	S Vietnam (Hon Ba Island)		RDB
	Pegu kukri snake	O. cruentatus (Günther, 1868)	Myanmar	LC	IUCN RDB
		O. culaochamensis S.N. Nguyen et al., 2017	Vietnam		RDB
	North-east Indian kukri snake, Cantor's kukri snake	O. cyclurus (Cantor, 1839)	India (Assam), Myanmar, Thailand, Laos, Cambodia, Vietnam, China (Yunnan), Nepal, Bangladesh	LC	IUCN RDB
		O. deuvei David, G. Vogel & van Rooijen, 2008	Cambodia, southern Vietnam, Laos, North East Thailand	LC	IUCN RDB
	Gray's kukri snake, Bengalese kukri snake	O. dorsalis (Gray & Hardwicke, 1835)	India (Assam), Bhutan, Bangladesh, Myanmar, Thailand		RDB
	Eberhardt's kukri snake	O. eberhardti Pellegrin, 1910	Vietnam, China (Guangxi, Fujian), possibly Laos, Cambodia and Myanmar	LC	IUCN RDB
	Nagarkot kukri snake	O. erythrogaster Boulenger, 1907	Central and East Nepal, India (Sikkim)		RDB
	Red-striped kukri snake, Namsang kukri snake	O. erythrorhachis Wall, 1910	India (Arunachal Pradesh)	VU	IUCN RDB
	Jewelled kukri snake, Everett's kukri snake	O. everetti Boulenger, 1893	Indonesia (Kalimantan), Malaysia (Sabah)	LC	IUCN RDB
	Small-banded kukri snake, fasciolated kukri snake	O. fasciolatus (Günther, 1864)	Myanmar, Thailand, Laos, Cambodia, Vietnam	LC	IUCN RDB
	Forbes' kukri snake	O. forbesi (Boulenger, 1883)	Indonesia (Selaru and Yamdena in Tanimbar Islands)	NT	IUCN RDB
	Taiwan kukri snake, Formosa kukri snake	O. formosanus (Günther, 1872)	Vietnam, Taiwan, South Japan (Ryukyu Islands, primarily Okinawa, Miyako and Yaeyama Islands), South China (Chekiang, Jiangxi, Fujian, Guangdong, Nan Ao Island, Hainan, Guangxi, Hong Kong, Zhejiang, Yunnan)		RDB
	Hampton's kukri snake	O. hamptoni Boulenger, 1918	Myanmar	DD	IUCN RDB
	Hua Hin Kukri Snake	O. huahin Pauwels, Larsen, Suthanthangjai, David & Sumontha, 2017	Thailand (Hua Hin)	DD	
	Inornate kukri snake, unicolored kukri snake	O. inornatus (Boulenger, 1914)	Cambodia, North and East Thailand	LC	IUCN RDB
	Jintakune's kukri snake	O. jintakunei Pauwels, Wallach, David, Chanhome, 2002	South Thailand	DD	IUCN RDB
	Grey kukri snake, Joynson's kukri snake	O. joynsoni (M.A. Smith, 1917)	northern Thailand, possibly Laos, Myanmar, China (Yunnan)	LC	IUCN RDB
	Walnut kukri snake	O. juglandifer (Wall, 1909)	India (Sikkim), West Bhutan	VU	IUCN RDB
	Kampuchea Kukri Snake	O. kampucheaensis Neang, Grismer & Daltry, 2012	Cambodia		RDB
	coral red kukri snake	O. kheriensis Acharji & Ray, 1936	India (Uttar Pradesh), Southwest Nepal		RDB
	Lacroix kukri snake	O. lacroixi Angel & Bourret, 1933	China (Sichuan, Yunnan), Vietnam	VU	IUCN RDB
	Medog kukri snake	O. lipipengi Jiang, Wang, Li, Ding, Ding & Che, 2020	China (Tibet)		RDB
		O. lungshenensis Zheng & Huang, 1978	China (Chongqing, Guangxi, Guizhou, Hunan)	NT	IUCN RDB
	Angel's kukri snake	O. macrurus (Angel, 1927)	Vietnam	DD	IUCN RDB
	Barred short-headed snake, spotted kukri snake	O. maculatus (Taylor, 1918)	Philippines (Mindanao)	LC	IUCN RDB
	Arakan kukri snake, McDougall's kukri snake	O. mcdougalli Wall, 1905	Myanmar	LC	IUCN RDB
	Bluebelly kukri snake	O. melaneus Wall, 1909	India		RDB
	Abor Hills kukri snake	O. melanozonatus Wall, 1922	India, China (Tibet)		RDB
	Sulu short-headed snake, Meyerink's kukri snake	O. meyerinkii (Steindachner, 1891)	Philippine Islands (Bongao, Jolo, Papahang, Sibutu, Tawi-Tawi in Sulu Archipelago), possibly Malaysia (Sabah)	EN	IUCN RDB
	Spotted-bellied short-headed snake, Luzon kukri snake	O. modestus Günther, 1864	Philippines (Mindanao, Negros, Tablas, Panay, Cebu, possibly Luzon)	VU	IUCN RDB
	Morice's kukri snake	O. moricei David, G. Vogel & van Rooijen, 2008	Southern Vietnam	DD	IUCN RDB
	Cambodian kukri snake, Mouhot's kukri snake	O. mouhoti (Boulenger, 1914)	Cambodia, East Thailand	LC	IUCN RDB
	Nagao kukri snake	O. nagao David, T.Q. Nguyen, T. Nguyen, Jiang, T. Chen, Teynié & Ziegler, 2012	Northern Vietnam, Southwest China (Guangxi), Laos		RDB
	Nikhil's kukri snake	O. nikhili Whitaker & Dattatri, 1982	India (Tamil Nadu)	DD	IUCN RDB
	Palawan kukri snake, Palawan short-headed snake	O. notospilus Günther, 1873	Philippine Islands (Palawan, Busuanga, Balabac, Mindanao)		RDB
	Eyed kukri snake, ocellated kukri snake	O. ocellatus (Morice, 1875)	Cambodia, Lao, southern Vietnam	LC	IUCN RDB
	Eight-lined kukri snake, eight-striped kukri snake, Grace's kukri snake	O. octolineatus (Schneider, 1801)	Brunei, Indonesia (Java, Borneo, Sumatra), Malaysia (Peninsular Malaysia, Sabah, Sarawak), Singapore	LC	IUCN RDB
	Ornate kukri snake	O. ornatus Van Denburgh, 1909	China (Anhui, Fujian, Guangdong, Guangxi, Hunan, Jiangxi, Sichuan, Zhejiang), Taiwan,	LC	IUCN RDB
	Perkin's short-headed snake	O. perkinsi (Taylor, 1925)	Philippines (Palawan, Culion and Calauit Islands)	NT	IUCN RDB
	Petronella's kukri snake	O. petronellae Roux, 1917	Indonesia (Sumatra)	DD	IUCN RDB
	Pha-Ngan kukri snake	O. phangan Pauwels, Thongyai, Chantong & Sumontha, 2021	Thailand (Surat Thani Province: Pha-Ngan Island)		RDB
		O. planiceps (Boulenger, 1888)	Myanmar	LC	IUCN RDB
	Pulau Weh kukri snake	O. praefrontalis F. Werner, 1913	Indonesia (Weh Island)	DD	IUCN RDB
		O. promsombuti Pauwels, Thongyai, Chantong, & Sumontha, 2021	Thailand (Surat Thani Province, Trang Province: Na Yong District)		RDB
	Bleeker's Kukri Snake	O. propinquus Jan, 1862	Indonesia (Java)		RDB
	False striped kukri snake	O. pseudotaeniatus David, G. Vogel & van Rooijen, 2008	Thailand	LC	IUCN RDB
		O. pulcherrimus F. Werner, 1909	Indonesia (Sumatra)	VU	IUCN RDB
	Purple kukri snake, brown kukri snake	O. purpurascens (Schlegel, 1837)	Brunei, Indonesia (Bali, Java, Kalimantan, Sumatra), Malaysia (Peninsular Malaysia, Sabah, Sarawak), Singapore, Thailand	LC	IUCN RDB
	Long-snouted kukri snake	O. rostralis H.N. Nguyen, Tran, L.H. Nguyen, Neang, Yushchenko & Poyarkov, 2020	Vietnam		
	Russell's kukri snake	O. russelius (Daudin, 1803)	India, Nepal		
	Saint Girons' kukri snake	O. saintgironsi David, G. Vogel & Pauwels, 2008	Vietnam, Cambodia	DD	IUCN RDB
	Sai Yok Kukri Snake	O. saiyok Sumontha, Kunya, Dangsri & Pauwels, 2017	Thailand (Kanchanaburi)	DD	
	Half-keeled kukri snake, barred kukri snake, banded kukri snake	O. signatus (Günther, 1864)	Indonesia (Sumatra), Malaysia (Peninsular Malaysia, Sabah, Sarawak), Singapore	LC	IUCN RDB
	Cave kukri snake	O. speleoserpens Pawangkhanant, Poyarkov, Ward-Smith, Grassby-Lewis, Sumontha, Kliukin, Idiiatullina, Trofimets, Suwannapoom & Lee, 2024	Thailand		
	Splendid kukri snake	O. splendidus (Günther, 1875)	Myanmar	LC	IUCN RDB
	Duméril's kukri snake	O. sublineatus A.M.C. Duméril, Bibron & A.H.A. Duméril, 1854	Sri Lanka	VU	IUCN RDB
	Striped kukri snake	O. taeniatus (Günther, 1861)	Cambodia, Laos, Thailand, Vietnam, Myanmar, possibly China (Yunnan)	LC	IUCN RDB
	Streaked Kukri snake, Loos snake	O. taeniolatus (Jerdon, 1853)	Afghanistan, India, Iran, Nepal, Bangladesh, Pakistan, Sri Lanka, Turkmenistan	LC	IUCN RDB
	Teynié's kukri snake	O. teyniei David, Hauser & G. Vogel, 2022	Laos		
	Mandalay kukri snake, Theobald's kukri snake	O. theobaldi (Günther, 1868)	Bangladesh, Myanmar	LC	IUCN RDB
	Tillack's kukri snake	O. tillacki Bandara, Ganesh, Kanishka, Danushka, Sharma, P. Campbell, Ineich, G. Vogel & Amarasinghe, 2022	India		
		O. tolaki Amarasinghe, Henkanaththegedara, Campbell, Riyanto, Hallermann & G. Vogel, 2021	Indonesia (Southeast Sulawesi)		RDB
		O. torquatus (Boulenger, 1888)	Myanmar	DD	IUCN RDB
	Travancore kukri snake	O. travancoricus Beddome, 1877	India (Kerala, Tamil Nadu)	DD	IUCN RDB
	Three-lined kukri snake	O. trilineatus (A.M.C. Duméril, Bibron & A.H.A. Duméril, 1854)	Indonesia (Nias, Siberut, Sumatra)	LC	IUCN RDB
	Langbian kukri snake	O. tuani S.N. Nguyen, Le, Vo & R. Murphy, 2022	Vietnam		RDB
		O. unicolor (Kopstein, 1926)	Indonesia (Selaru, Yamdena)	NT	IUCN RDB
	Jerdon's kukri snake	O. venustus (Jerdon, 1853)	India (Karnataka, Kerala, Tamil Nadu)	LC	IUCN RDB
	Dark-spined kukri snake, vertebral kukri snake	O. vertebralis (Günther, 1865)	Indonesia (Kalimantan), Malaysia (Sabah)	DD	IUCN RDB
	Bleeker's kukri snake	O. waandersi (Bleeker, 1860)	Indonesia (Java, Sulawesi, Buton, Sula Islands)		RDB
	Wagner's kukri snake	O. wagneri David & G. Vogel, 2012	Indonesia (Nias)		RDB
	yellow-striped kukri snake	O. woodmasoni (Sclater, 1891)	India (Nicobar Islands, possibly Andaman Islands)		RDB
