= Oligodon rostralis =

Scientific classification
- Kingdom: Animalia
- Phylum: Chordata
- Class: Reptilia
- Order: Squamata
- Suborder: Serpentes
- Family: Colubridae
- Genus: Oligodon
- Species: O. rostralis

Binomial name
- Oligodon rostralis H.N. Nguyen, Tran, L.H. Nguyen, Neang, Yushchenko, & Poyarkov, 2020

Species of snake

Oligodon rostralis, the long-snouted kukri snake, is a species of snake of the family Colubridae.

The snake is found in Vietnam.
