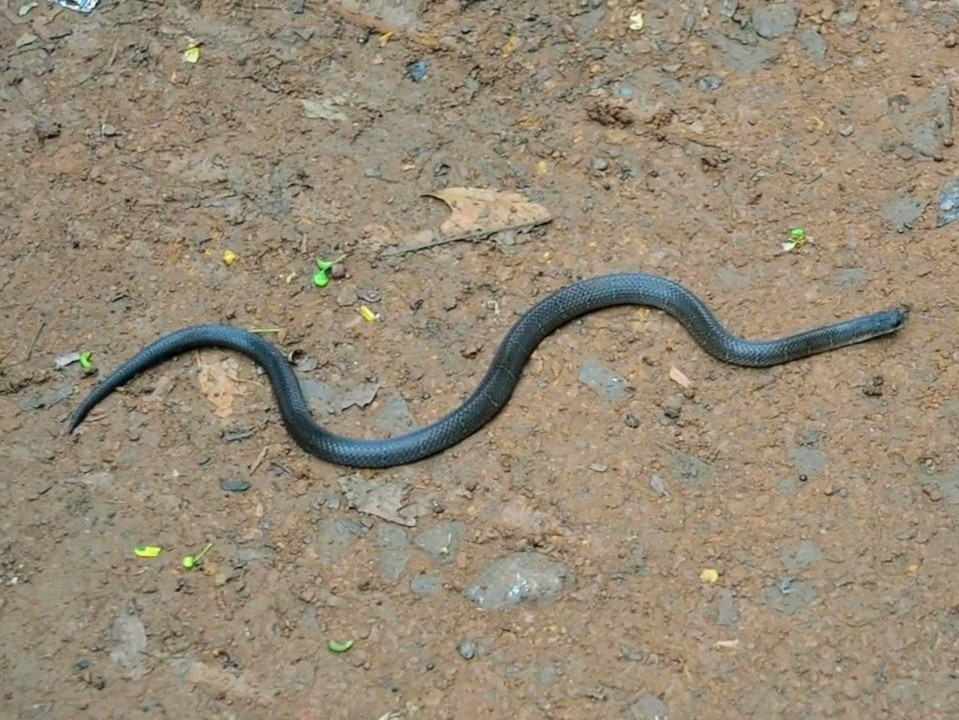
- Oligodon kampucheaensis in Cambodia

Scientific classification
- Kingdom: Animalia
- Phylum: Chordata
- Class: Reptilia
- Order: Squamata
- Suborder: Serpentes
- Family: Colubridae
- Genus: Oligodon
- Species: O. kampucheaensis

Binomial name
- Oligodon kampucheaensis Neang, Grismer, Daltry JC, 2012

= Oligodon kampucheaensis =

Species of snake

Oligodon kampucheaensis is a species of snakes in the subfamily Colubrinae. It is found in Cambodia.
