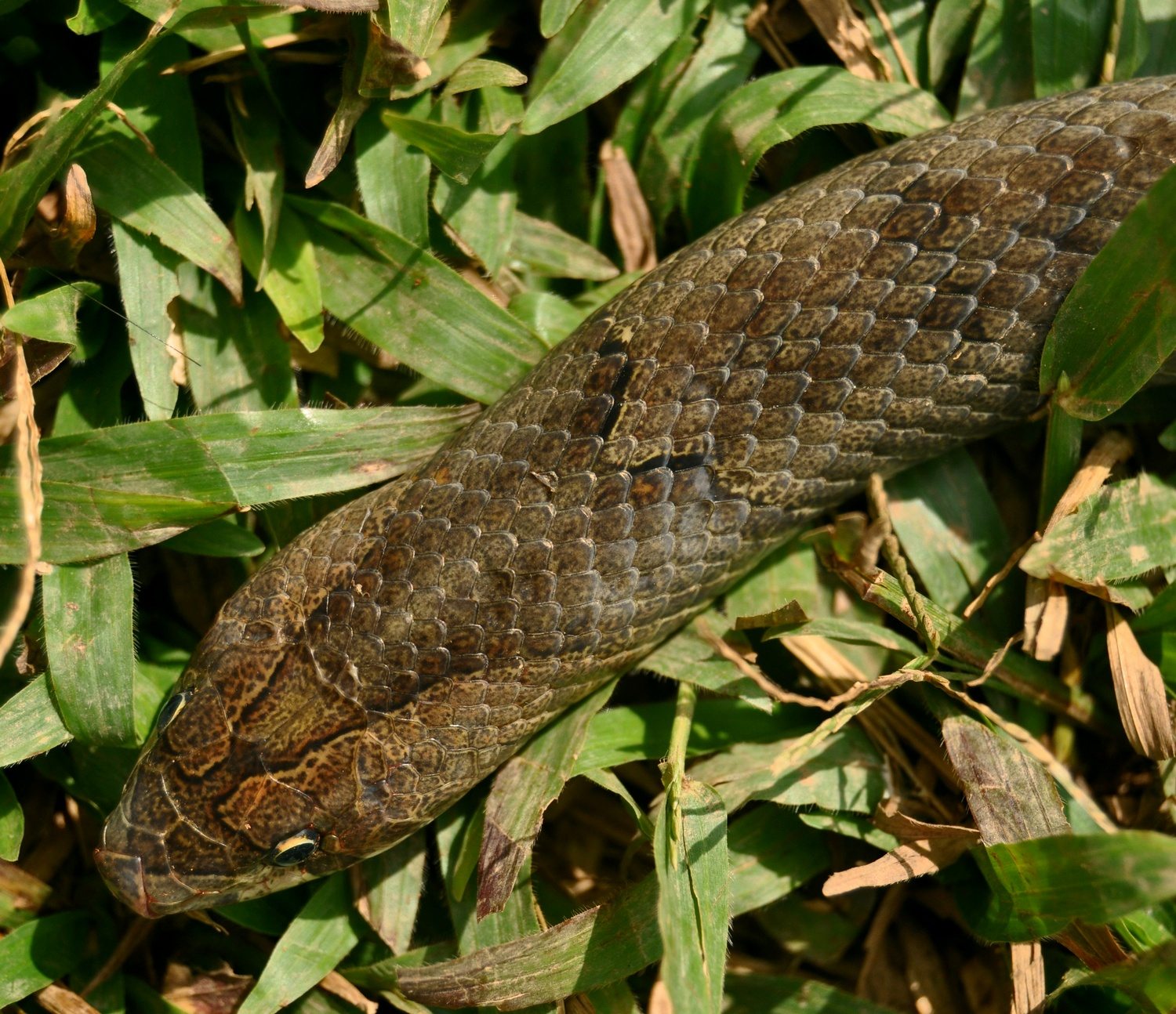

Conservation status
- Least Concern (IUCN 3.1)

Scientific classification
- Kingdom: Animalia
- Phylum: Chordata
- Class: Reptilia
- Order: Squamata
- Suborder: Serpentes
- Family: Colubridae
- Genus: Oligodon
- Species: O. purpurascens

Binomial name
- Oligodon purpurascens (Schlegel, 1837)

= Brown kukri snake =

Species of snake

The brown kukri snake (Oligodon purpurascens) is a species of snake of the family Colubridae.

== Geographic range ==
The snake is found in Indonesia, Malaysia, Brunei, Singapore, and Thailand.
