= Oligodon lacroixi =

Conservation status
- Vulnerable (IUCN 3.1)

Scientific classification
- Kingdom: Animalia
- Phylum: Chordata
- Class: Reptilia
- Order: Squamata
- Suborder: Serpentes
- Family: Colubridae
- Genus: Oligodon
- Species: O. lacroixi

Binomial name
- Oligodon lacroixi Angel & Bourret, 1933

Synonyms
- Opisthotropis lacroixi (Angel & Bourret, 1933)

Species of snake

Oligodon lacroixi, commonly known as the Lacroix kukri snake, is a species of snake in the subfamily Colubrinae of the family Colubridae. The species is native to Southeast Asia.

== Etymology ==
The specific name, lacroixi, is in honor of French mineralogist Alfred Lacroix.

== Geographic range ==
O. lacroixi is found in the Chinese provinces of Sichuan and Yunnan, and in northern Vietnam.

== Habitat ==
The preferred natural habitat of O. lacroixi is forest, at altitudes of 1,400–1,900 m (4,600–6,200 ft).

== Behavior ==
O. lacroixi is terrestrial and nocturnal.

== Reproduction ==
O. lacroixi is oviparous.
