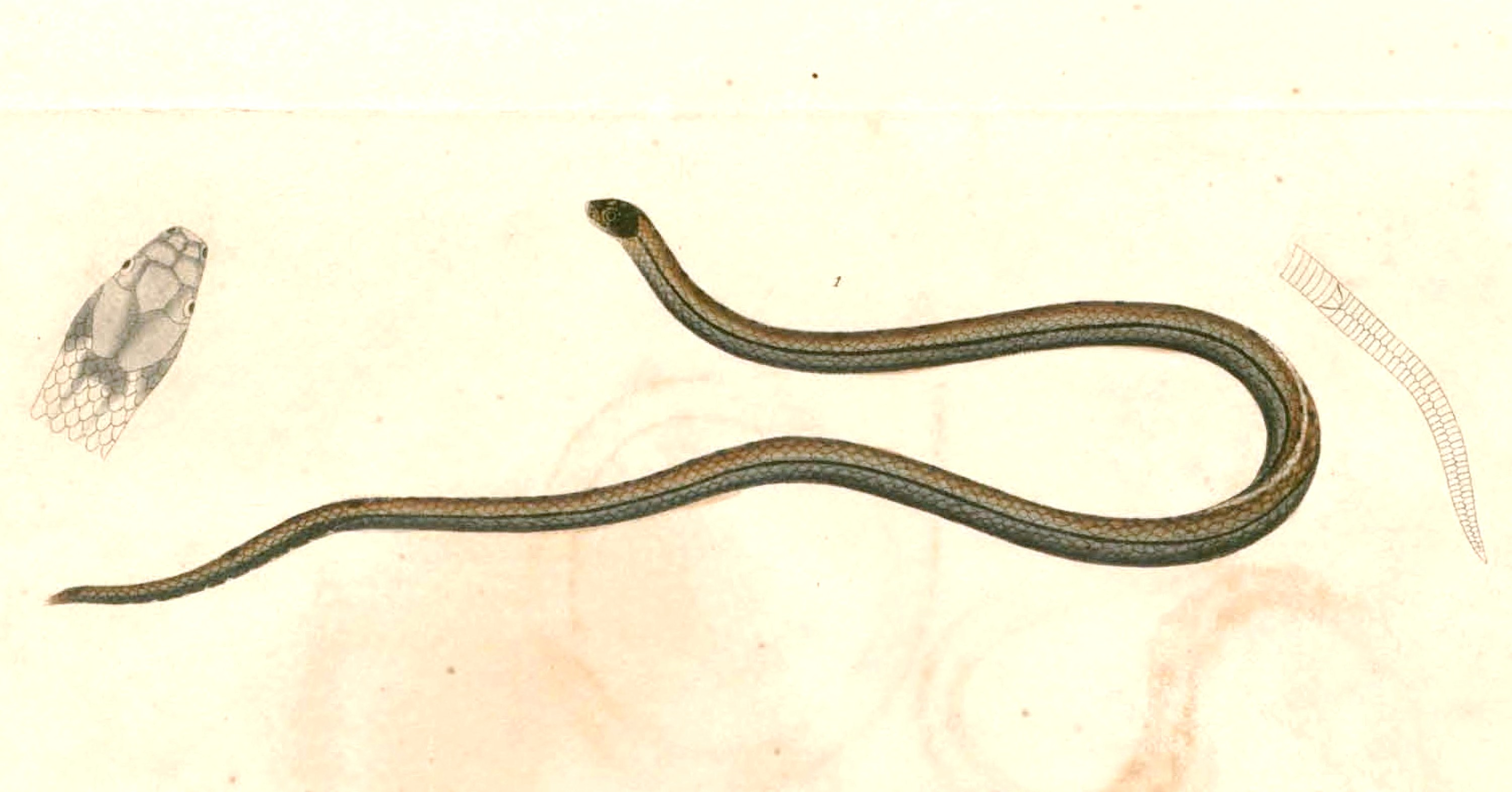

Conservation status
- Least Concern (IUCN 3.1)

Scientific classification
- Kingdom: Animalia
- Phylum: Chordata
- Class: Reptilia
- Order: Squamata
- Suborder: Serpentes
- Family: Colubridae
- Genus: Oligodon
- Species: O. dorsalis

Binomial name
- Oligodon dorsalis (Gray, 1834)

Synonyms
- Elaps dorsalis Gray in Gray and Hardwicke, 1934

= Oligodon dorsalis =

Gray's kukri snake

Species of snake

Oligodon dorsalis, the Bengalese kukri snake, Gray's kukri snake, or spot-tailed kukri snake, is a species of snake. It is found in Northeast India, Bhutan, Bangladesh, Myanmar, and Thailand.
