= Oligodon phangan =

Scientific classification
- Kingdom: Animalia
- Phylum: Chordata
- Class: Reptilia
- Order: Squamata
- Suborder: Serpentes
- Family: Colubridae
- Genus: Oligodon
- Species: O. phangan

Binomial name
- Oligodon phangan Pauwels, Thongyai, Chantong & Sumontha, 2021

Species of snake

The Pha-Ngan kukri snake (Oligodon phangan) is a species of snake of the family Colubridae.

== Geographic range ==
The snake is found in Thailand.
