= Oligodon modestus =

Conservation status
- Vulnerable (IUCN 3.1)

Scientific classification
- Kingdom: Animalia
- Phylum: Chordata
- Class: Reptilia
- Order: Squamata
- Suborder: Serpentes
- Family: Colubridae
- Genus: Oligodon
- Species: O. modestus

Binomial name
- Oligodon modestus (Günther, 1864)

Synonyms
- Oligodon modestum Günther, 1864

Species of snake

Oligodon modestus, commonly known as the spotted-bellied short-headed snake or the Luzon kukri snake, is a species of snake of the family Colubridae.

== Geographic range ==
The snake is found in the Philippines.
