= Oligodon eberhardti =

Conservation status
- Least Concern (IUCN 3.1)

Scientific classification
- Kingdom: Animalia
- Phylum: Chordata
- Class: Reptilia
- Order: Squamata
- Suborder: Serpentes
- Family: Colubridae
- Genus: Oligodon
- Species: O. eberhardti

Binomial name
- Oligodon eberhardti Pellegrin, 1910

Species of snake

Oligodon eberhardti, Eberhardt's kukri snake, is a species of snakes in the subfamily Colubrinae. It is found in Vietnam, Cambodia, and Laos.
