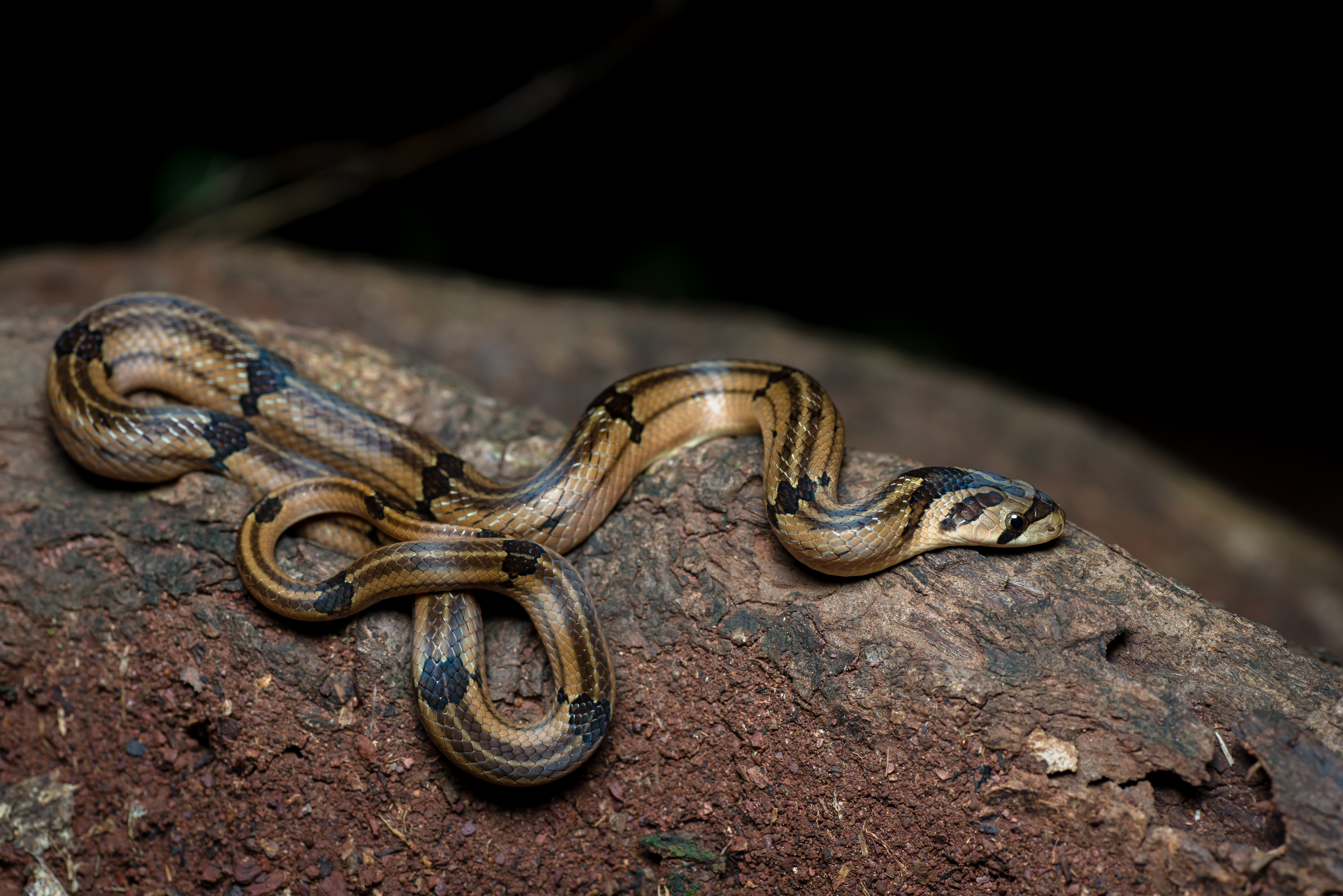
- Oligodon catenatus

Conservation status
- Least Concern (IUCN 3.1)

Scientific classification
- Kingdom: Animalia
- Phylum: Chordata
- Class: Reptilia
- Order: Squamata
- Suborder: Serpentes
- Family: Colubridae
- Genus: Oligodon
- Species: O. catenatus

Binomial name
- Oligodon catenatus (Blyth, 1854)

= Oligodon catenatus =

Species of snake

Oligodon catenatus, the Assam kukri snake, is a species of snakes in the subfamily Colubrinae. It is found in India, Myanmar, Vietnam, Cambodia, China, Thailand, and Laos.
