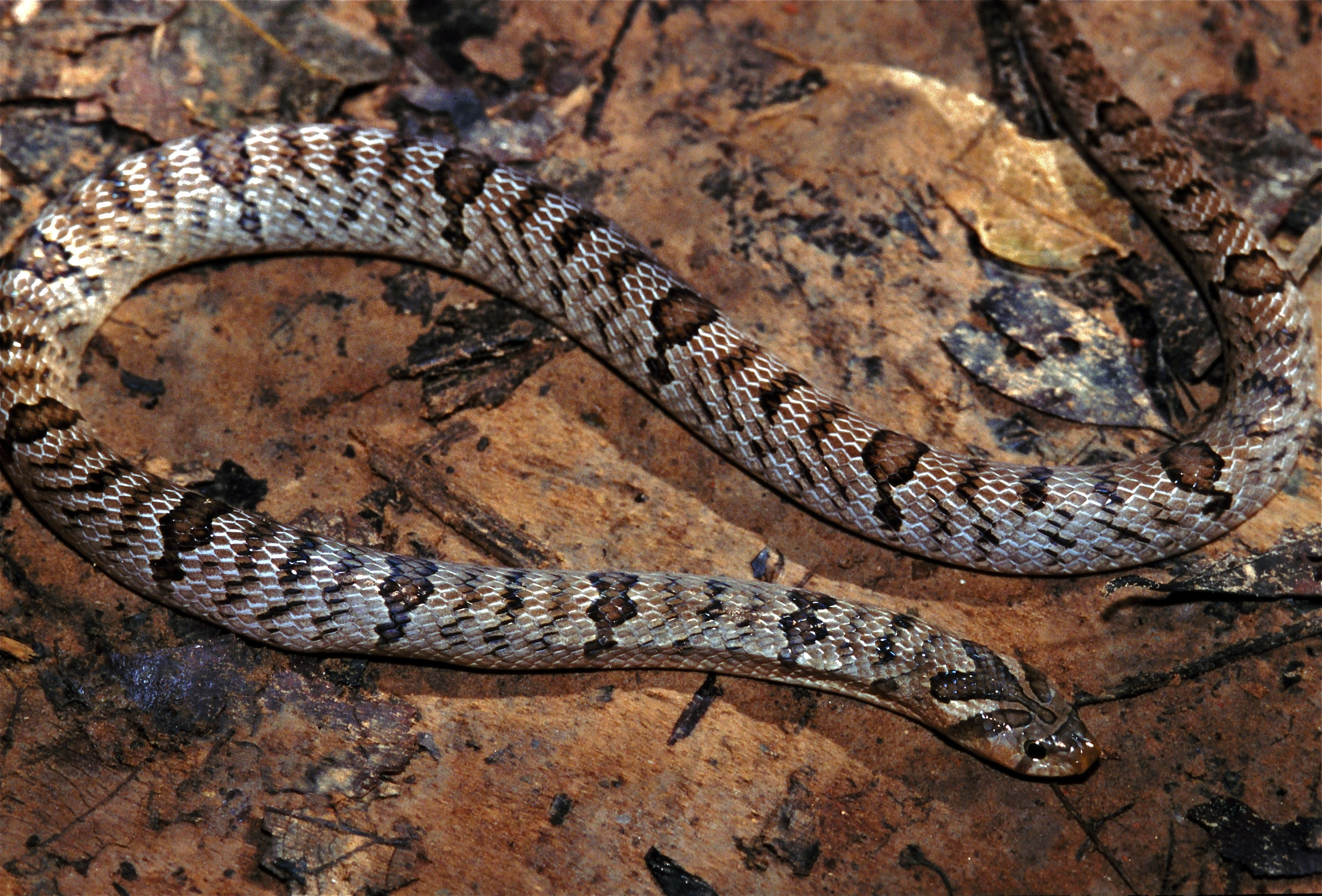

Conservation status
- Least Concern (IUCN 3.1)

Scientific classification
- Kingdom: Animalia
- Phylum: Chordata
- Class: Reptilia
- Order: Squamata
- Suborder: Serpentes
- Family: Colubridae
- Genus: Oligodon
- Species: O. fasciolatus

Binomial name
- Oligodon fasciolatus (Günther, 1864)

Synonyms
- Simotes fasciolatus Günther, 1864; Simotes smithi Werner, 1925; Oligodon cyclurus smithi — Werner, 1925; Oligodon cyclurus superfluens Taylor, 1965; Oligodon fasciolatus — Cox et al., 1998

= Oligodon fasciolatus =

Species of snake in the family Colubridae

Oligodon fasciolatus, commonly known as the small-banded kukri snake or the fasciolated kukri snake, is a species of snake in the family Colubridae. The species is native to Southeast Asia. This snake uniquely eviscerates live poisonous toads, Duttaphrynus melanostictus (Asian common toads), to avoid toxic white liquid the toad secretes. This snake also preys on the Kaloula pulchra (Banded bullfrog).

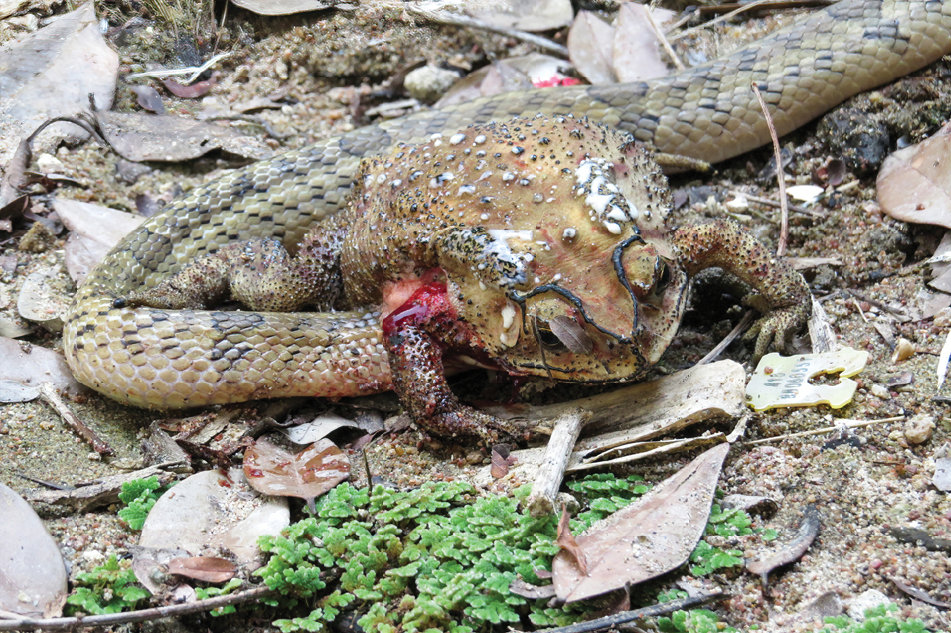
Eating an Asian common toad

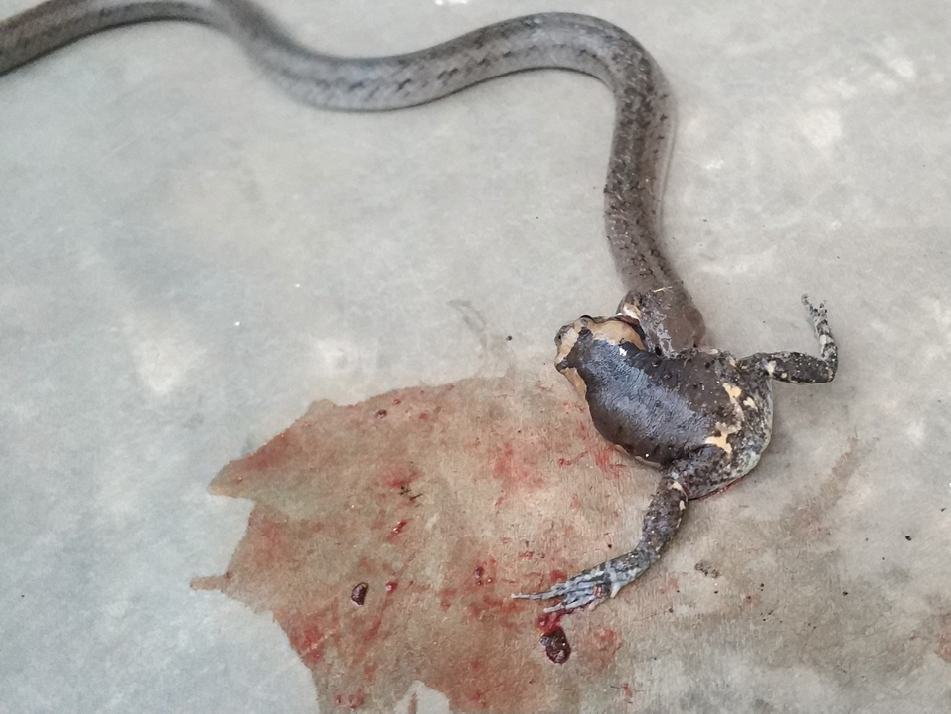
Eating a banded bullfrog

== Geographic range ==
O. fasciolatus is found in southeastern Myanmar, Thailand, Cambodia, Laos, and Vietnam.

== Habitat ==
The preferred natural habitat of O. fasciolatus is forest.

== Description ==
O. fasciolatus may attain a total length of 115 cm (45 in). O. fasciolatus appears brownish-ground, tinged with yellow-olive, greyish-brown, or reddish-brown.

== Reproduction ==
O. fasciolatus is oviparous.
