= Oligodon jintakunei =

Conservation status
- Data Deficient (IUCN 3.1)

Scientific classification
- Kingdom: Animalia
- Phylum: Chordata
- Class: Reptilia
- Order: Squamata
- Suborder: Serpentes
- Family: Colubridae
- Genus: Oligodon
- Species: O. jintakunei

Binomial name
- Oligodon jintakunei Pauwels, Wallach, David & Chanhome, 2002

Species of snake

Oligodon jintakunei, also known commonly as Jintakune's kukri snake and the Krabi kukri snake, is a species of snake in the subfamily Colubrinae of the family Colubridae. The species is endemic to Thailand.

== Etymology ==
The specific name, jintakunei, is in honor of Thai herpetologist Piboon Jintakune.

== Geographic range ==
O. jintakunei is found in southern peninsular Thailand, in Krabi Province.

== Habitat ==
The preferred natural habitat of O. jintakunei is forest.

== Description ==
The holotype of O. jintakunei has a snout-to-vent length (SVL) of 37 cm (15 in), plus a tail length of 8 cm (3.1 in). Its coloration (in ethanol) is as follows. Dorsally, it is dark brown, with narrow whitish crossbands, 11 on the body, plus 3 on the tail. Ventrally, it is whitish. The top of the head is beige.

== Behavior ==
Although a forest-dwelling species, O. jintakunei is not arboreal, but instead it is terrestrial.

== Reproduction ==
O. jintakunei is oviparous.
