= Oligodon tuani =

Scientific classification
- Kingdom: Animalia
- Phylum: Chordata
- Class: Reptilia
- Order: Squamata
- Suborder: Serpentes
- Family: Colubridae
- Genus: Oligodon
- Species: O. tuani

Binomial name
- Oligodon tuani S.N. Nguyen, Le, Vo, & R. Murphy, 2022

Species of snake

Oligodon tuani, the Langbian kukri snake, is a species of snake of the family Colubridae.

The snake is found in Vietnam.
