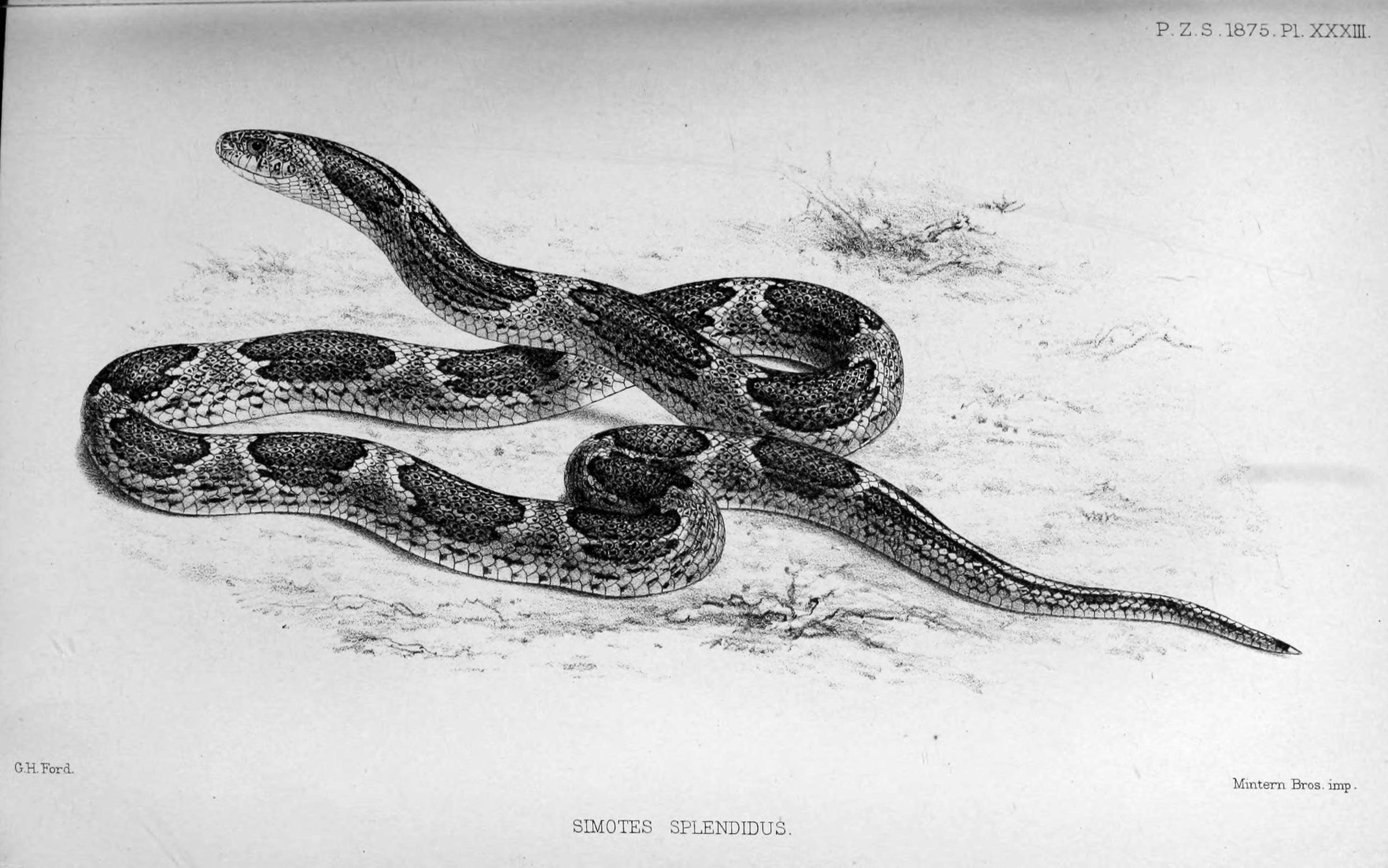

Conservation status
- Least Concern (IUCN 3.1)

Scientific classification
- Kingdom: Animalia
- Phylum: Chordata
- Class: Reptilia
- Order: Squamata
- Suborder: Serpentes
- Family: Colubridae
- Genus: Oligodon
- Species: O. splendidus

Binomial name
- Oligodon splendidus (Günther, 1875)

Synonyms
- Simotes splendidus Günther, 1875

= Oligodon splendidus =

Species of snake

Oligodon splendidus, commonly known as the splendid kukri snake, is a species of snake of the family Colubridae.

The species, belonging to the genus Oligodon, is endemic to Myanmar. It was first described by Albert Günther in 1875 as Simotes splendidus.

Illustration of an Oligodon splendidus
