= Oligodon erythrorhachis =

Namsang kukri snake

Conservation status
- Vulnerable (IUCN 3.1)

Scientific classification
- Kingdom: Animalia
- Phylum: Chordata
- Class: Reptilia
- Order: Squamata
- Suborder: Serpentes
- Family: Colubridae
- Genus: Oligodon
- Species: O. erythrorhachis

Binomial name
- Oligodon erythrorhachis Wall, 1910

Species of snake

Oligodon erythrorhachis, the Namsang kukri snake, is a species of snake found in India (Arunachal Pradesh (Chessa - Papum Pare district) ).
