= Oligodon lipipengi =

Scientific classification
- Kingdom: Animalia
- Phylum: Chordata
- Class: Reptilia
- Order: Squamata
- Suborder: Serpentes
- Family: Colubridae
- Genus: Oligodon
- Species: O. lipipengi

Binomial name
- Oligodon lipipengi Jiang, Wang, Li, Ding, Ding, & Che, 2020

Species of snake

Oligodon lipipengi, the Medog kukri snake, is a species of snakes in the subfamily Colubrinae. It is found in Tibet.
