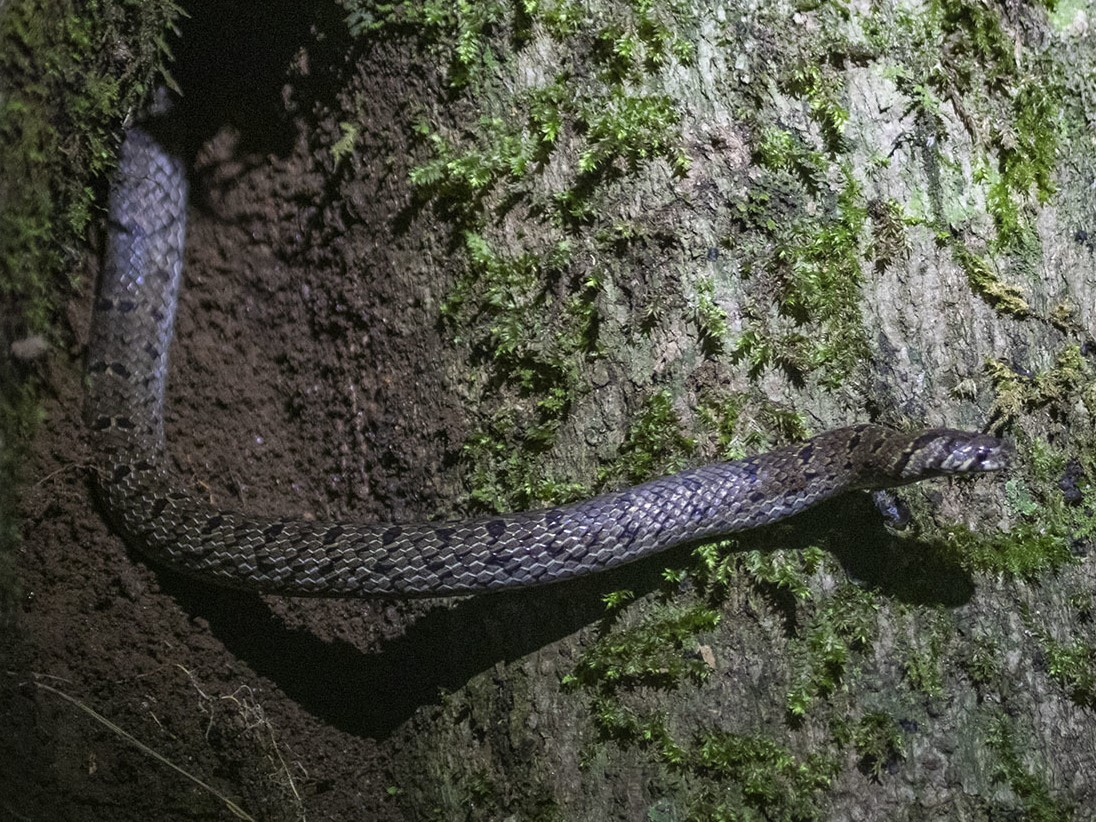

Conservation status
- Data Deficient (IUCN 3.1)

Scientific classification
- Kingdom: Animalia
- Phylum: Chordata
- Class: Reptilia
- Order: Squamata
- Suborder: Serpentes
- Family: Colubridae
- Genus: Oligodon
- Species: O. travancoricus

Binomial name
- Oligodon travancoricus Beddome, 1877

= Oligodon travancoricus =

Species of snake

Oligodon travancoricus, the Travancore kukri snake, is a species of snake in the family Colubridae. It is found in India.
