= Oligodon maculatus =

Conservation status
- Least Concern (IUCN 3.1)

Scientific classification
- Kingdom: Animalia
- Phylum: Chordata
- Class: Reptilia
- Order: Squamata
- Suborder: Serpentes
- Family: Colubridae
- Genus: Oligodon
- Species: O. maculatus

Binomial name
- Oligodon maculatus (Taylor, 1918)

Species of snake

Oligodon maculatus, the spotted kukri snake, is a species of snakes in the subfamily Colubrinae. It is found in the Philippines.

The species is thought to be endemic to Mindanao island. It has been confirmed to extend its distribution into Leyte in a published study in 2024.
