= Banded kukri snake =

There are two species of snake named banded kukri snake:

- Oligodon arnensis
- Oligodon signatus
