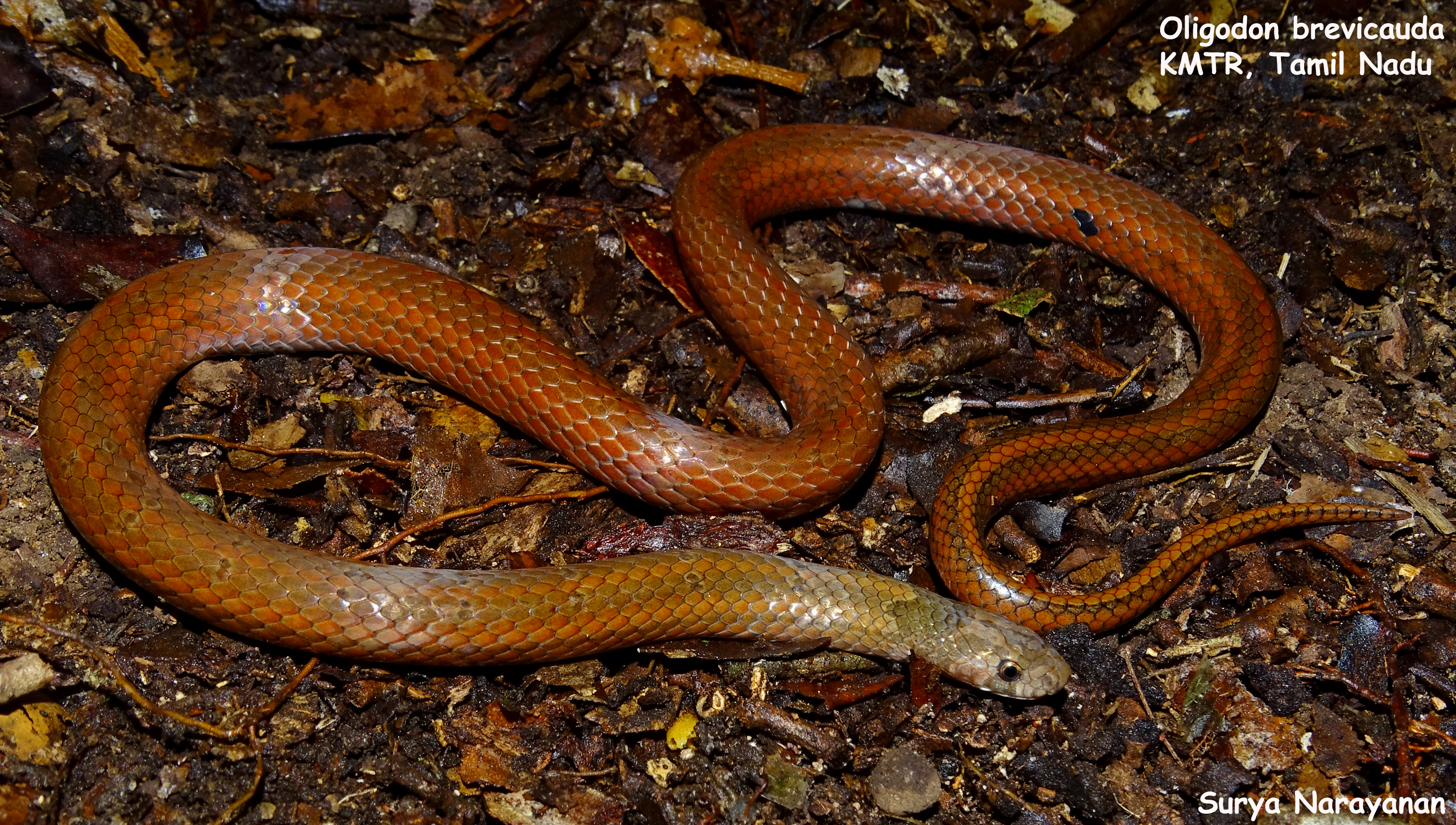

Conservation status
- Vulnerable (IUCN 3.1)

Scientific classification
- Kingdom: Animalia
- Phylum: Chordata
- Class: Reptilia
- Order: Squamata
- Suborder: Serpentes
- Family: Colubridae
- Genus: Oligodon
- Species: O. brevicauda

Binomial name
- Oligodon brevicauda Günther, 1862

= Oligodon brevicauda =

Shorthead kukri snake

Species of snake

Oligodon brevicauda, the shorthead kukri snake, is a species of snake found in the Western Ghats of India.

== Description ==
See snake scales for terms used

Rostral in contact with and partly separating the prefrontals. No internasals; no loreal touching the preocular; seven supralabials, 3rd and 4th touching the eye; 1 anterior temporal. Scales in 15 rows. Ventrals 158–173, not angulate laterally. Caudals 25–29.

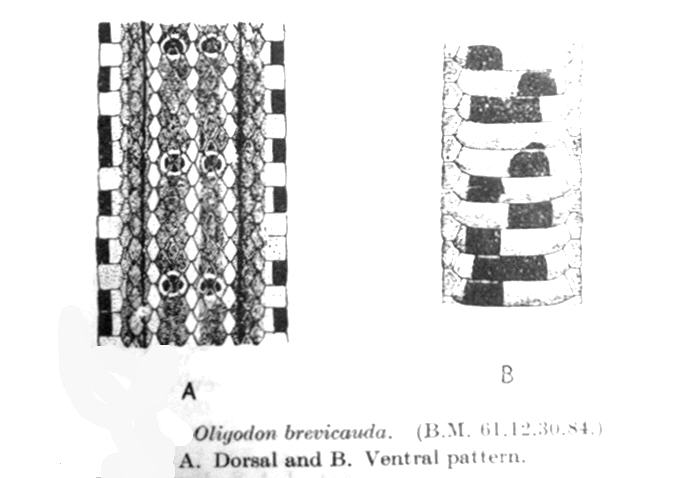
Scale pattern

Brown above with a light vertebral stripe, bordered on each side by a dark brown or black stripe involving two scale-rows; these stripes may or may not be marked with paired series of spots or short bars on the anterior part of the body; a narrow dark lateral stripe on each side of scale row 3; brownish or whitish below (red in life) with large quadrangular or transverse black spots; head with a crescent-shaped band in front, an oblique temporal stripe, and a large dark nuchal patch usually connecting by a longitudinal stripe with the prefrontal mark.

Total length of females 500mm with tail 55mm.

Currently this species is known only from Anamalai hills, Periyar hills and Agastyamalai hills of southern western ghats.
