= Oligodon joynsoni =

Conservation status
- Least Concern (IUCN 3.1)

Scientific classification
- Kingdom: Animalia
- Phylum: Chordata
- Class: Reptilia
- Order: Squamata
- Suborder: Serpentes
- Family: Colubridae
- Genus: Oligodon
- Species: O. joynsoni

Binomial name
- Oligodon joynsoni (M.A. Smith, 1917)

Synonyms
- Simotes longicauda joynsoni M.A. Smith, 1917; Oligodon joynsoni — M.A. Smith, 1943

Species of snake

Oligodon joynsoni, also known commonly as the gray kukri snake, the grey kukri snake, and Joynson's kukri snake, is a species of snake in the subfamily Colubrinae of the family Colubridae. The species is native to Southeast Asia.

== Etymology ==
The specific name, joynsoni, is in honor of H.W. Joynson who collected the holotype and was a British cricketer and naturalist in Singapore.

== Geographic range ==
O. joynsoni is found in Laos, Thailand, and extreme southern China, and may also occur in adjacent Myanmar.

== Habitat ==
The preferred natural habitat of O. joynsoni is forest, at altitudes of 300–600 m (980–1,970 ft).

== Behavior ==
O. joynsoni is terrestrial.

== Description ==
O. joynsoni may attain a total length of 76 cm (30 in), which includes a tail length of 10.5 cm (4.1 in).

== Reproduction ==
O. joynsoni is oviparous.
