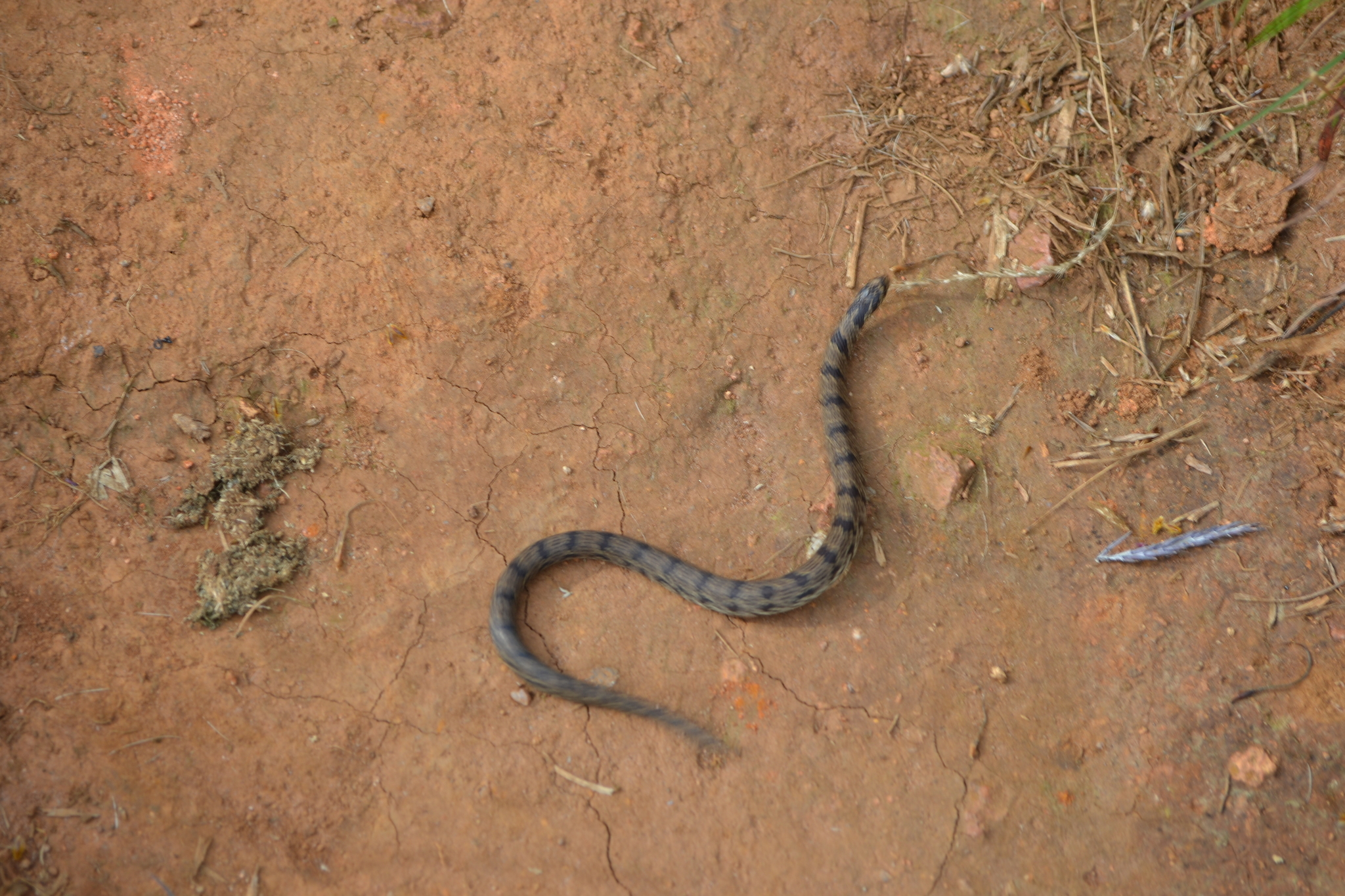

Conservation status
- Least Concern (IUCN 3.1)

Scientific classification
- Kingdom: Animalia
- Phylum: Chordata
- Class: Reptilia
- Order: Squamata
- Suborder: Serpentes
- Family: Colubridae
- Genus: Oligodon
- Species: O. venustus

Binomial name
- Oligodon venustus (Jerdon, 1853)

Synonyms
- Xenodon venustum Jerdon, 1853; Simotes bi-notatus Duméril & Bibron, 1854 (fide Smith, 1943); Simotes venustus – Günther, 1864; Simotes binotatus – Jan, 1865

= Oligodon venustus =

Species of snake

Oligodon venustus, also known as Jerdon's kukri snake, is a species of snake found in the Western Ghats of India (south of Goa).
