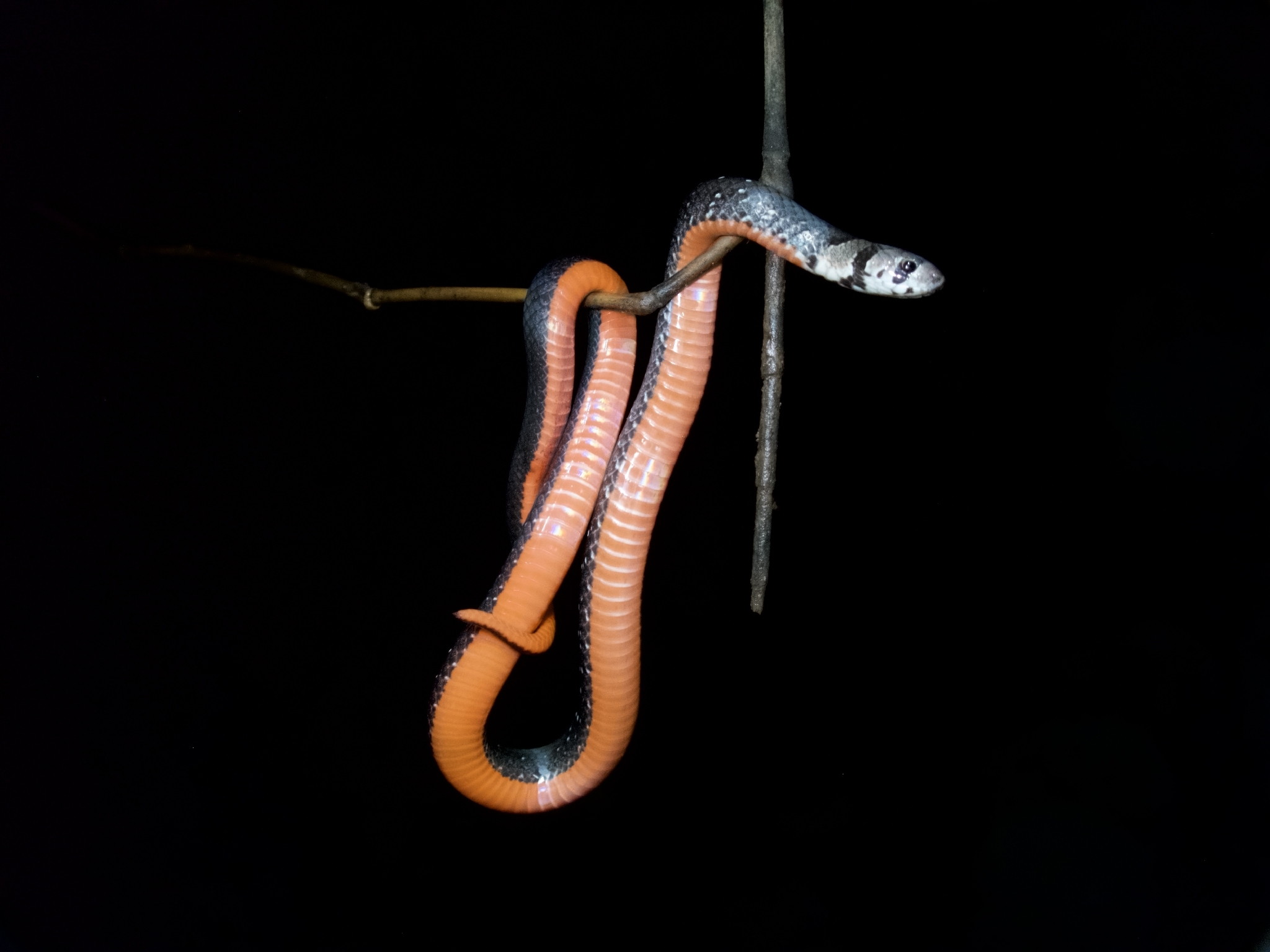

Conservation status
- Least Concern (IUCN 3.1)

Scientific classification
- Kingdom: Animalia
- Phylum: Chordata
- Class: Reptilia
- Order: Squamata
- Suborder: Serpentes
- Family: Colubridae
- Genus: Oligodon
- Species: O. notospilus

Binomial name
- Oligodon notospilus Günther, 1873

= Oligodon notospilus =

Species of snake

Oligodon notospilus, the Palawan kukri snake or Palawan short-headed snake, is a species of snake of the family Colubridae.

== Geographic range ==
The snake species is endemic to the Philippines. It is found in Palawan, in the Calamian Islands, Balabac and Mindanao.
