= Oligodon planiceps =

Conservation status
- Least Concern (IUCN 3.1)

Scientific classification
- Kingdom: Animalia
- Phylum: Chordata
- Class: Reptilia
- Order: Squamata
- Suborder: Serpentes
- Family: Colubridae
- Genus: Oligodon
- Species: O. planiceps

Binomial name
- Oligodon planiceps (Boulenger, 1888)

Species of snake

Oligodon planiceps is a species of snake of the family Colubridae.

The snake is found in Myanmar.
