= Oligodon cruentatus =

Conservation status
- Least Concern (IUCN 3.1)

Scientific classification
- Kingdom: Animalia
- Phylum: Chordata
- Class: Reptilia
- Order: Squamata
- Suborder: Serpentes
- Family: Colubridae
- Genus: Oligodon
- Species: O. cruentatus

Binomial name
- Oligodon cruentatus (Günther, 1868)

Synonyms
- Simotes cruentatus Günther, 1868

Species of snake

The Pegu kukri snake (Oligodon cruentatus) is a species of snake of the family Colubridae. It is endemic to Myanmar.

== Geographic range ==
The snake is found in Myanmar between 16° and 24° north.
