= Oligodon annulifer =

Conservation status
- Least Concern (IUCN 3.1)

Scientific classification
- Kingdom: Animalia
- Phylum: Chordata
- Class: Reptilia
- Order: Squamata
- Suborder: Serpentes
- Family: Colubridae
- Genus: Oligodon
- Species: O. annulifer

Binomial name
- Oligodon annulifer (Boulenger, 1893)

Synonyms
- Simotes annulifer Boulenger, 1893

Species of snake

Oligodon annulifer, also known as the ringed kukri snake, is a colubrid snake endemic to the island of Borneo.

== Taxonomy ==
O. annulifer has a poorly known classification. A number of other species were originally listed as subspecies of it. A 1999 paper suggested that O. annulifer, which at that point was only known from four juvenile specimens, was actually only a juvenile of a different Oligodon species. However, a 2010 paper confirmed the existence of O. annulifer as a distinct species, based on the recent capture of an adult specimen. The species name annulifer derives from the Latin word anus which means "ring," and the word fero, which means "carry." Oligodon annulifer is a member of the genus Oligodon, a genus common throughout central and tropical Asia. The genus belongs to the snake family Colubridae, the largest snake family, with member species being found on every continent except Antarctica.

== Description ==
The species is brown on the back, with black rings that contained oval yellowish-brown spots. A specimen described in 1893 had 26 such rings. The sides of the snake are black, with yellowish lines, and the head is also yellowish brown. It has a dark bar across the forehead, and a dark inverted Y shape above the nape of the neck. The underside of the snake is white, with small black dots. The 1893 specimen, which was a young snake, was 16 centimeters long.

== Habitat and ecology ==
Oligodon annulifer is oviparous, or egg-laying. The species is known to eat the eggs of other reptiles, and it has teeth which are adapted for this purpose; they are sharply edged, to slit eggs easily. It primarily lives in lowland rainforest, and it is a terrestrial, or ground-dwelling, species.

== Distribution ==
O. annulifer is found on the island of Borneo, where it is thought to be endemic. Specimens have been caught at five different locations across the island, including at Bukit-Baka National Park in Indonesia and the Ulu Temburong National Park in Brunei. It is not thought to be very abundant. It has been observed at up to 100 meters above sea level.

Oligodon annulifer has been described from five scattered locations in Borneo, including from inside two protected areas. This broad distribution has led to the IUCN classifying it as a species of "least concern." The habitat that it occupies, lowland rainforest, is under threat from human activity, specifically agricultural activity for the production of palm oil. However, the effect of this activity, which also includes logging and mining, on the snake is not known.
