= Oligodon meyerinkii =

Conservation status
- Vulnerable (IUCN 3.1)

Scientific classification
- Kingdom: Animalia
- Phylum: Chordata
- Class: Reptilia
- Order: Squamata
- Suborder: Serpentes
- Family: Colubridae
- Genus: Oligodon
- Species: O. meyerinkii

Binomial name
- Oligodon meyerinkii (Steindachner, 1891)

Synonyms
- Simotes meyerinkii Steindachner, 1891; Simotes octolineatus var. C. Steindachner, 1891; Holarchus meyerinkii (Steindachner, 1891)

Species of snake

Oligodon meyerinkii is a species of snake in the subfamily Colubrinae of the family Colubridae. The species is native to parts of Southeast Asia. It is commonly known as Meyerink's kukri snake, the Sulu kukri snake, and the Sulu short-headed snake.

== Etymology ==
The specific name, meyerinkii, is probably in honor of Hermann Friedrich Meyerink (1850–1908), who was the German Consul to the Philippines in Manila, although Steindachner gives no etymology.

== Geographic range ==
Oligodon meyerinkii is found in the Philippines on the islands of Bongao, Jolo, Sibutu and Tawi-Tawi in Sulu Archipelago, and possibly in the Malaysian state of Sabah on Borneo.

== Habitat ==
The preferred natural habitat of Oligodon meyerinkii is forest.

== Behavior ==
Oligodon meyerinkii is terrestrial, semifossorial, and semiarboreal.

== Reproduction ==
Oligodon meyerinkii is oviparous.
