= Oligodon macrurus =

Conservation status
- Data Deficient (IUCN 3.1)

Scientific classification
- Kingdom: Animalia
- Phylum: Chordata
- Class: Reptilia
- Order: Squamata
- Suborder: Serpentes
- Family: Colubridae
- Genus: Oligodon
- Species: O. macrurus

Binomial name
- Oligodon macrurus (Angel, 1927)

Species of snake

Oligodon macrurus, Angel's kukri snake, is a species of snakes in the subfamily Colubrinae. It is found in Vietnam.
