= Oligodon perkinsi =

Conservation status
- Data Deficient (IUCN 3.1)

Scientific classification
- Kingdom: Animalia
- Phylum: Chordata
- Class: Reptilia
- Order: Squamata
- Suborder: Serpentes
- Family: Colubridae
- Genus: Oligodon
- Species: O. perkinsi

Binomial name
- Oligodon perkinsi (Taylor, 1925)

Synonyms
- Holarchus perkinsi Taylor, 1925

Species of snake

Oligodon perkinsi, also known commonly as Perkin's short-headed snake, is a species of snake in the subfamily Colubrinae of the family Colubridae. The species is endemic to the Philippines.

== Etymology ==
The specific name perkinsi, is in honor of Dr. Granville Akers Perkins (1891–1985), a chemist working in the Philippines, who collected the holotype..

== Geographic distribution ==
In the Philippines, Oligodon perkinsi is known to live on the islands of Busuanga, Calauit, Culion, and Palawan.

== Habitat ==
The preferred natural habitat of Oligodon perkinsi is forest, at elevations from near sea level to 900 m (3,000 ft).

== Behavior ==
Oligodon perkinsi is terrestrial and nocturnal.

== Reproduction ==
Oligodon perkinsi is oviparous.
