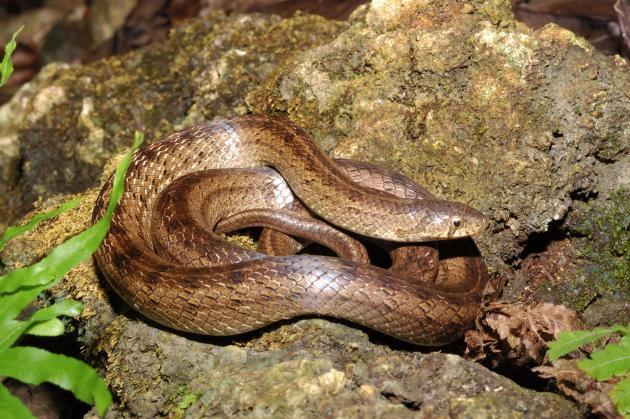

Conservation status
- Least Concern (IUCN 3.1)

Scientific classification
- Kingdom: Animalia
- Phylum: Chordata
- Class: Reptilia
- Order: Squamata
- Suborder: Serpentes
- Family: Colubridae
- Genus: Oligodon
- Species: O. formosanus

Binomial name
- Oligodon formosanus (Günther, 1872)

Synonyms
- Simotes formosanus Günther, 1872; Simotes hainanensis Boettger, 1894

= Oligodon formosanus =

Species of snake

Oligodon formosanus, also known as the Formosa kukri snake or beautiful kukri snake, is a species of snake in the family Colubridae.

The species epithet is named after its range in Taiwan (Formosa).

Formosa kukri snakes eat the eggs of Chinese box turtles.

== Description ==
The scale colorings range in the brown-red spectrum. The body is a tawny light brown with two darker russet stripes running down either side of the spine, where thin black lines that break into smaller dotted patterns occasionally diagonally intersect. The underbelly is off-white.

== Distribution ==
The snake is found in China (including Hong Kong and Hainan), Japan (including Ryukyu Islands, Okinawa, Miyako and Yaeyama), Taiwan, and northern Vietnam.
