= Oligodon culaochamensis =

Scientific classification
- Kingdom: Animalia
- Phylum: Chordata
- Class: Reptilia
- Order: Squamata
- Suborder: Serpentes
- Family: Colubridae
- Genus: Oligodon
- Species: O. culaochamensis

Binomial name
- Oligodon culaochamensis Nguyen, Nguyen, NGUYEN, Phan, Jiang, & Murphy, 2017

Species of snake

Oligodon culaochamensis is a species of snakes in the subfamily Colubrinae. It is found in Vietnam.

Oligodon culaochamensis
