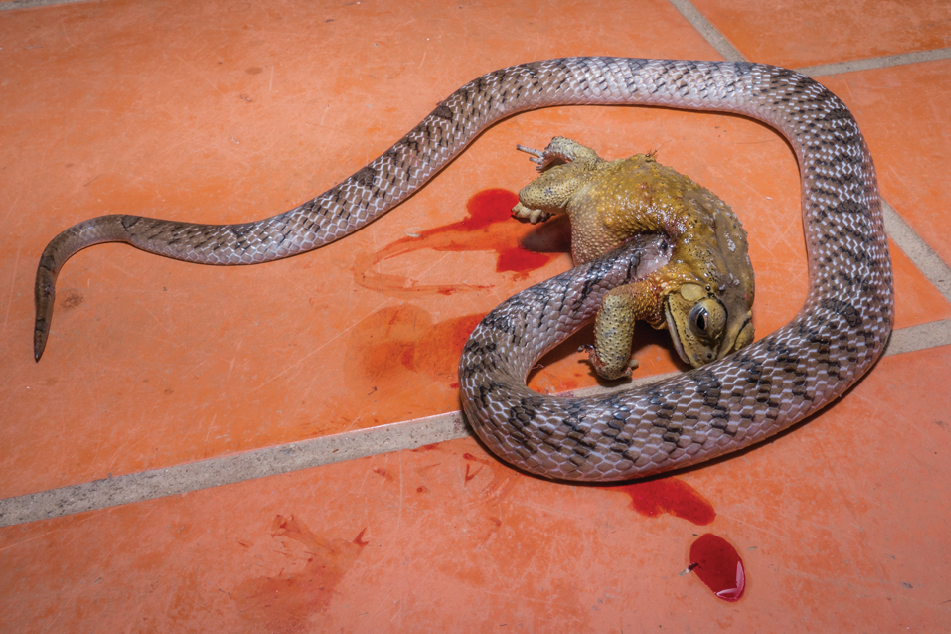
- Eating an Asian common toad in Cát Tiên National Park, Vietnam

Conservation status
- Least Concern (IUCN 3.1)

Scientific classification
- Kingdom: Animalia
- Phylum: Chordata
- Class: Reptilia
- Order: Squamata
- Suborder: Serpentes
- Family: Colubridae
- Genus: Oligodon
- Species: O. ocellatus

Binomial name
- Oligodon ocellatus (Morice, 1875)

= Oligodon ocellatus =

Species of snake

The ocellated kukri snake (Oligodon ocellatus) is a species of snake of the family Colubridae.

== Geographic range ==
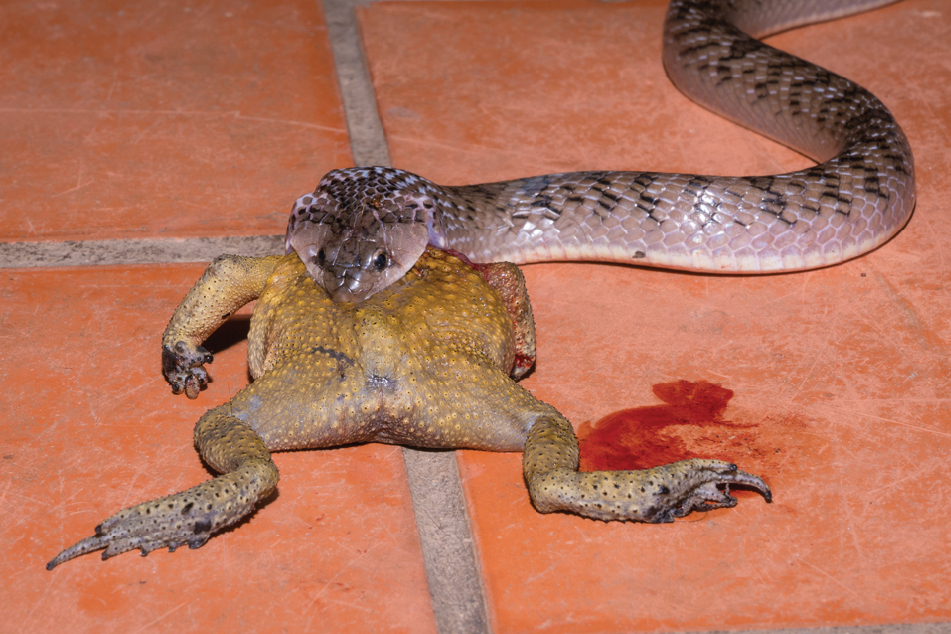
Eating an Asian common toad

The snake is found in Cambodia, Vietnam, Laos, and Thailand.

== Biology ==
Like several other species of kukri snakes (genus Oligodon), the species feeds on toads. Observations indicate that it likely first eviscerates such prey and devours its organs, before swallowing the toad whole.
