= Oligodon nagao =

Scientific classification
- Kingdom: Animalia
- Phylum: Chordata
- Class: Reptilia
- Order: Squamata
- Suborder: Serpentes
- Family: Colubridae
- Genus: Oligodon
- Species: O. nagao

Binomial name
- Oligodon nagao David, Nguyen, Nguyen, Jiang, Chen, Teynié & Ziegler, 2012

Species of snake

Oligodon nagao, the Nagao kukri snake, is a species of snakes in the family Colubridae. Specimens have been collected from Lang Son and Cao Bang in northern Vietnam, Guangxi Autonomous Region in southern People's Republic of China, and from Khammouane Province in central Laos PDR.

== Description ==
It has 15 or 17 dorsal scale rows at its mid-body, a short tail which can be up to 107 mm and a body up to 680 mm in length.

== Distribution ==
Vietnam, Laos, China.
