= Oligodon vertebralis =

Conservation status
- Data Deficient (IUCN 3.1)

Scientific classification
- Kingdom: Animalia
- Phylum: Chordata
- Class: Reptilia
- Order: Squamata
- Suborder: Serpentes
- Family: Colubridae
- Genus: Oligodon
- Species: O. vertebralis

Binomial name
- Oligodon vertebralis Günther, 1865

Species of snake

The vertebral kukri snake or dark-spined kukri snake (Oligodon vertebralis) is a species of snake of the family Colubridae.

== Geographic range ==
The snake is found in Indonesia and Malaysia.
