= Oligodon saiyok =

Scientific classification
- Kingdom: Animalia
- Phylum: Chordata
- Class: Reptilia
- Order: Squamata
- Suborder: Serpentes
- Family: Colubridae
- Genus: Oligodon
- Species: O. saiyok

Binomial name
- Oligodon saiyok Sumontha, Kunya, Dangsri & Pauwels, 2017

Species of snake

Oligodon saiyok, the Sai Yok kukri snake, is a species of snake of the family Colubridae.

The snake is found] in Thailand.
