= Oligodon mcdougalli =

Conservation status
- Least Concern (IUCN 3.1)

Scientific classification
- Kingdom: Animalia
- Phylum: Chordata
- Class: Reptilia
- Order: Squamata
- Suborder: Serpentes
- Family: Colubridae
- Genus: Oligodon
- Species: O. mcdougalli

Binomial name
- Oligodon mcdougalli Wall, 1905

Species of snake

Oligodon mcdougalli, also known commonly as the Arakan kukri snake and McDougall's kukri snake, is a species of snake in the subfamily Colubrinae of the family Colubridae. The species is endemic to Myanmar

== Etymology ==
The specific name, mcdougalli, is in honor of a Mr. E. McDougall who collected the holotype.

== Geographic distribution ==
Oligodon mcdougalli is only known from two coastal areas in Rakhine State (formerly Arakan State), at elevations below 125 m (410 ft).

== Habitat ==
The preferred natural habitat of Oligodon mcdougalli is forest.

== Reproduction ==
Oligodon mcdougalli is oviparous.

== Conservation status ==
Although only three specimens are known, Oligodon mcdougalli has been classified as of "least concern" because its distribution area has relatively pristine lowland tropical forests and there are no known threats.
