= Oligodon waandersi =

Conservation status
- Least Concern (IUCN 3.1)

Scientific classification
- Kingdom: Animalia
- Phylum: Chordata
- Class: Reptilia
- Order: Squamata
- Suborder: Serpentes
- Family: Colubridae
- Genus: Oligodon
- Species: O. waandersi

Binomial name
- Oligodon waandersi (Bleeker, 1860)

Species of snake

Bleeker's kukri snake (Oligodon waandersi) is a species of snake of the family Colubridae.

== Geographic range ==
The snake is found in Indonesia.
