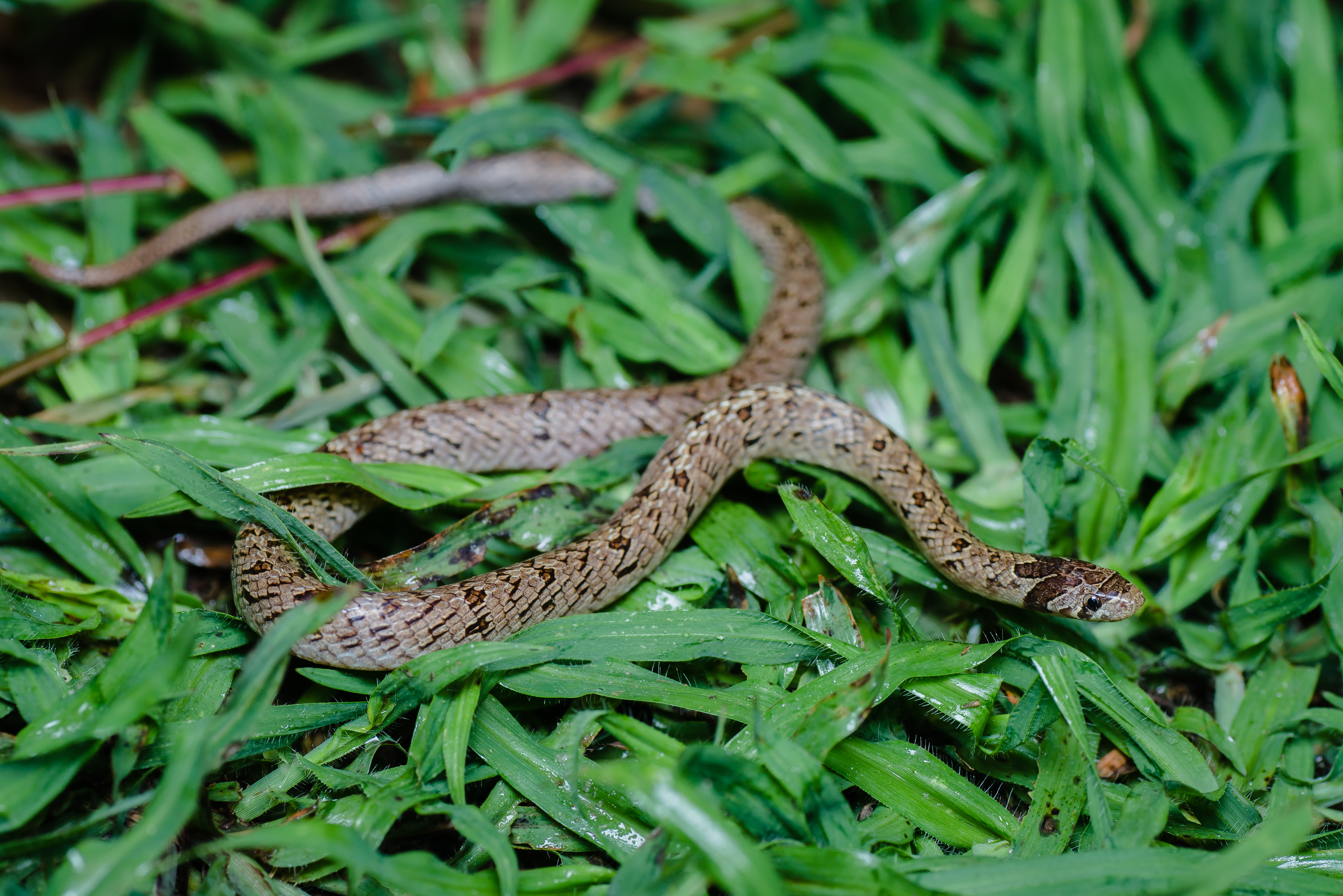

Conservation status
- Least Concern (IUCN 3.1)

Scientific classification
- Kingdom: Animalia
- Phylum: Chordata
- Class: Reptilia
- Order: Squamata
- Suborder: Serpentes
- Family: Colubridae
- Genus: Oligodon
- Species: O. barroni

Binomial name
- Oligodon barroni (M.A. Smith, 1916)

Synonyms
- Simotes barroni M.A. Smith, 1916; Holarchus taeniatus caudaensis Bourret, 1934; Oligodon barroni — M.A. Smith, 1943

= Oligodon barroni =

Species of snake

Oligodon barroni, or Barron's kukri snake, is a species of snake in the subfamily Colubrinae of the family Colubridae. The species is endemic to Southeast Asia.

== Etymology ==
The specific name, barroni, is in honor of Mr. P.A.R. Barron who collected the first three specimens including the holotype.

== Geographic range ==
O. barroni is found in Cambodia, Laos, Thailand, and Vietnam.

== Habitat ==
The preferred natural habitat of O. barroni is forest, at altitudes of 300–1,000 m (980–3,280 ft).

== Description ==
O. barroni may attain a total length (including tail) of about 40 cm (16 in). The dorsal scales are arranged in 17 rows at midbody.

== Diet ==
O. barroni feeds predominantly on eggs of small skinks and of other reptiles.

== Reproduction ==
O. barroni is oviparous.
