= Oligodon lungshenensis =

Conservation status
- Near Threatened (IUCN 3.1)

Scientific classification
- Kingdom: Animalia
- Phylum: Chordata
- Class: Reptilia
- Order: Squamata
- Suborder: Serpentes
- Family: Colubridae
- Genus: Oligodon
- Species: O. lungshenensis

Binomial name
- Oligodon lungshenensis Zheng & Huang, 1978

Synonyms
- Oligodon guizhouensis Li, 1989

Species of snake

Oligodon lungshenensis is a species of snake of the family Colubridae. It is endemic to China.

== Geographic range ==
The snake is known from a number of locations in central and southern China, from Chongqing, Guangxi, Guizhou, and Hunan provinces.
