= Oligodon bivirgatus =

Scientific classification
- Kingdom: Animalia
- Phylum: Chordata
- Class: Reptilia
- Order: Squamata
- Suborder: Serpentes
- Family: Colubridae
- Genus: Oligodon
- Species: O. bivirgatus

Binomial name
- Oligodon bivirgatus T. Qian, S. Qi, J. Shi, Y. Lu, R.W. Jenkins, Y. Mo & P. Li, 2021

Species of snake

Oligodon bivirgatus, the double striped kukri snake, is a species of snakes in the subfamily Colubrinae. It is found in China.
