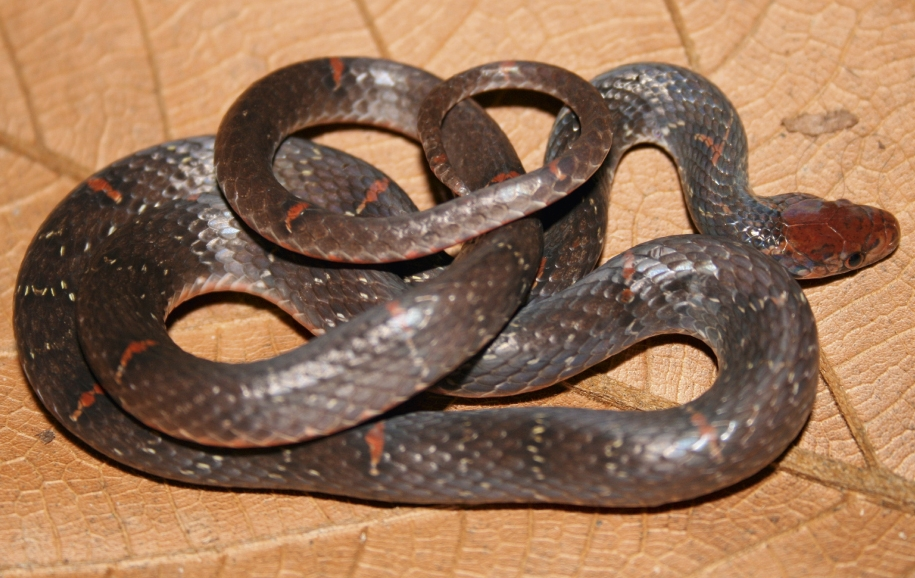

Conservation status
- Least Concern (IUCN 3.1)

Scientific classification
- Kingdom: Animalia
- Phylum: Chordata
- Class: Reptilia
- Order: Squamata
- Suborder: Serpentes
- Family: Colubridae
- Genus: Oligodon
- Species: O. signatus

Binomial name
- Oligodon signatus (Günther, 1864)

= Oligodon signatus =

Species of snake

Oligodon signatus, also known as the half-keeled kukri snake, the barred kukri snake, or the banded kukri snake, is a species of snake of the family Colubridae.

The snake is found in Singapore, on the island of Sumatra in Indonesia and Sarawak and Sabah in Peninsular Malaysia.
