= Yellow-spotted wolf snake =

There are two species of snake named yellow-spotted wolf snake:

- Lycodon flavomaculatus
- Lycodon flavozonatus
