= Lycodon cavernicolus =

Scientific classification
- Kingdom: Animalia
- Phylum: Chordata
- Class: Reptilia
- Order: Squamata
- Suborder: Serpentes
- Family: Colubridae
- Genus: Lycodon
- Species: L. cavernicolus

Binomial name
- Lycodon cavernicolus Grismer, Quah, Anuar, Muin, Wood & Nor, 2014

Species of snake

Lycodon cavernicolus, also known as Gua Wang Burma wolf snake, is a species of colubrid snake found in peninsular Malaysia. It was first described in 2014.

== Etymology ==
The species name cavernicolus is derived from the Latin words caverna, which means "cave" and cola which means "dweller", and means that L. cavernicolus lives in caves. However, strictly speaking the ending "-colus" is a correctable error, as in Latin -cola as a suffix is a masculine noun and is not declined in compound words.

== Phylogeny ==
L. cavernicolus is a member of the genus Lycodon, a genus of snakes commonly known as wolf snakes. The genus belongs to the snake family Colubridae, the largest snake family, with member species being found on every continent except Antarctica.

== Description ==
L. cavernicolus has a flat head that is distinct from its neck, with an elongated snout. The nostrils are in the middle of the nasal scale, and large. The eyes are also large, with a vertical, elliptical pupil. The body is somewhat compressed from side to side. A holotype had a total length of 50.8 centimetres (20.0 in). The body is light brown, with bands of a lighter share. 36 bands are on the back and 29 on the tail. The head is the color of the lighter bands. The belly of the snake is beige. Juveniles have bold white markings on a darker brown background.

L. cavernicolus can be differentiated from closely related snakes such as Lycodon ruhstrati and Lycodon fasciatus by the presence of an elongated loreal scale, and either 245 ventral scales in the male or 232 in the female. Juveniles of the species have white bands.

== Habitat & ecology ==
The holotype for L. cavernicolus was found deep inside a limestone cave. The snake is oviparous, or egg-laying. It is thought to eat geckos of the genus Cyrtodactylus.

== Distribution ==
The holotype for the species, as well as another specimen, were collected in a cave in Perlis State Park, Perlis, Malaysia.
