= Müller's wolf snake =

There are two species of snake named Müller's wolf snake:

- Lycodon muelleri
- Stegonotus muelleri
