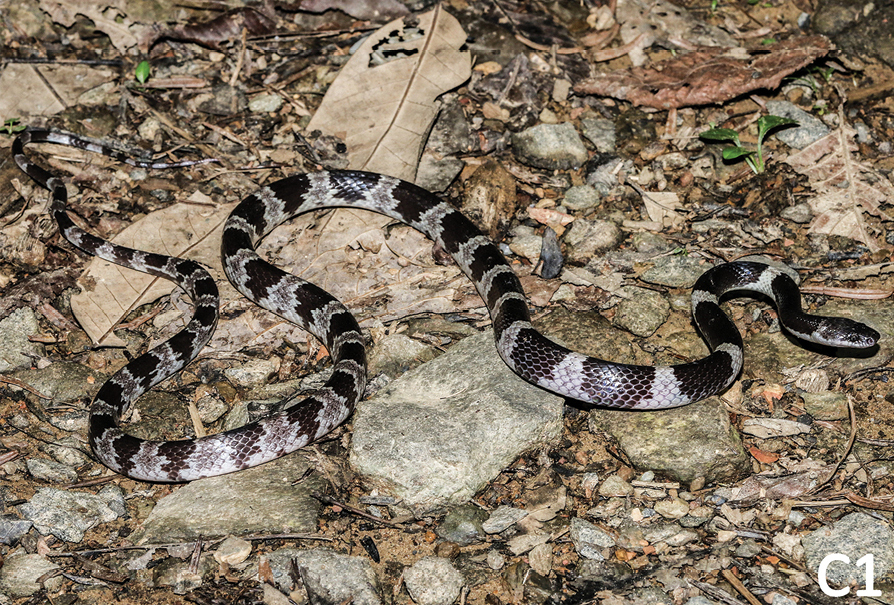

Conservation status
- Least Concern (IUCN 3.1)

Scientific classification
- Kingdom: Animalia
- Phylum: Chordata
- Class: Reptilia
- Order: Squamata
- Suborder: Serpentes
- Family: Colubridae
- Genus: Lycodon
- Species: L. ruhstrati

Binomial name
- Lycodon ruhstrati (Fischer, 1886)

Synonyms
- Ophites ruhstrati Fischer, 1886; Dinodon septentrionale ruhstrati — Stejneger, 1907; Lycodon ruhstrati — Lanza, 1999

= Lycodon ruhstrati =

Species of snake

Lycodon ruhstrati, also known as Ruhstrat's wolf snake, the mountain wolf snake, or the Formosa wolf snake, is a species of non-venomous colubrid snake found in Taiwan, southern and eastern China, and northern Vietnam.

== Taxonomy ==
The specific name, ruhstrati, was chosen to honor German-born Ernst Konrad A. Ruhstrat (died 1913), of the Imperial Chinese Customs Service, who collected the type specimens of this species in southern Taiwan.

Lycodon ruhstrati is a member of the genus Lycodon, a genus of snakes commonly known as wolf snakes. The genus belongs to the snake family Colubridae. Colubridae is the largest snake family, with member genera and species being found on every continent except Antarctica.

The genus Lycodon has at times been placed in the genus Oligodon, but this classification is under dispute. The species Lycodon multifasciatus was previously listed as a subspecies of L. ruhstrati, being classified as Lycodon ruhstrati multifasciatus in 1984. However, in 2008 it was classified as a separate species as Lycodon multifasciatus. The species Dinodon futsingensis, first described in 1928, was synonymised with Lycodon ruhstrati in 1929. However, in 2009 it was recognized as a separate species, and named Lycodon futsingensis. In 2013, the genetic sequence of L. ruhsrati was used as part of a study which suggested combining the genera Lycodon and Dinodon. L. ruhstrati currently has two subspecies: Lycodon ruhstrati ruhstrati (Fischer, 1886), the nominate subspecies, first described from Taiwan; and Lycodon ruhstrati abditus (G. Vogel et al., 2009), described from Vietnam.

== Description ==
The color pattern of L. ruhstrati is highly variable, although it tends to be dark-colored with several light-colored crossbands on its back. The largest specimen found prior to 2008 had a total length (including tail) of 94 cm (37 in).

== Habitat and ecology ==
L. ruhstrati is oviparous, or egg-laying, with females laying four eggs in each clutch. It is a montane species and is found on slopes, in caves, and beneath stones in mountain streams. It is also found in agricultural land and both natural and plantation forests in the foothills.

The snake is known to predate upon the brown anole, Anoles sagrei, as well as upon Diploderma swinhonis.

== Range and distribution ==
L. ruhstrati occurs in the Tranninh Plateau of Laos, northern Vietnam, Taiwan, and southern China. It has been found in the Chinese provinces of Anhui, Fujian, Gansu, Guangdong, Guanxi, Guizhou, Jiangxi, Shaanxi, Sichuan, and Zhejiang, as well as Hong Kong. The subspecies Lycodon ruhstrati multifasciatus (Maki, 1931) has also been found in Japan's Ryukyu Islands; however, this subspecies was subsequently reclassified as a separate species.

L. ruhstrati is classified as a species of Least Concern by the International Union for Conservation of Nature, because it is presumed to have a large population and to be distributed over a large area. It is also not thought to be declining very fast. No steps are currently being taken to specifically conserve this species, although it is thought to be found in a number of protected areas.
