= Lycodon flavicollis =

Conservation status
- Least Concern (IUCN 3.1)

Scientific classification
- Kingdom: Animalia
- Phylum: Chordata
- Class: Reptilia
- Order: Squamata
- Suborder: Serpentes
- Family: Colubridae
- Genus: Lycodon
- Species: L. flavicollis

Binomial name
- Lycodon flavicollis Mukherjee & Bhupathy, 2007

Species of snake

The yellow-collared wolf snake (Lycodon flavicollis) is a species of snake in the family colubridae. It is found in India.
