= Lycodon tiwarii =

Conservation status
- Least Concern (IUCN 3.1)

Scientific classification
- Kingdom: Animalia
- Phylum: Chordata
- Class: Reptilia
- Order: Squamata
- Suborder: Serpentes
- Family: Colubridae
- Genus: Lycodon
- Species: L. tiwarii

Binomial name
- Lycodon tiwarii Biswas & Sanyal, 1965

Species of snake

Lycodon tiwarii, commonly known as the Andaman wolf snake and Tiwari's wolf snake, is a species of snake in the family Colubridae. The species is native to the Andaman Islands and Nicobar Islands of India.

== Etymology ==
The specific name, tiwarii, is in honor of Indian zoologist Krishna Kant Tiwari.

== Reproduction ==
L. tiwarii is oviparous.
