= Lycodon sealei =

Scientific classification
- Kingdom: Animalia
- Phylum: Chordata
- Class: Reptilia
- Order: Squamata
- Suborder: Serpentes
- Family: Colubridae
- Genus: Lycodon
- Species: L. sealei

Binomial name
- Lycodon sealei Leviton, 1955

Species of snake

Lycodon sealei, Seale's banded Asian wolf snake, is a species of snake in the family Colubridae.

== Distribution ==
It is found in Indonesia, Brunei, Malaysia, and the Philippines.
