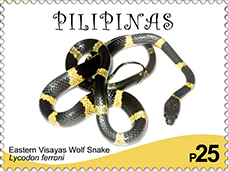

Conservation status
- Vulnerable (IUCN 3.1)

Scientific classification
- Kingdom: Animalia
- Phylum: Chordata
- Class: Reptilia
- Order: Squamata
- Suborder: Serpentes
- Family: Colubridae
- Genus: Lycodon
- Species: L. ferroni

Binomial name
- Lycodon ferroni Lanza, 1999

= Lycodon ferroni =

Species of snake

Ferron's Asian wolf snake (Lycodon ferroni) is a species of snake in the family colubridae. It is found in the Philippines.
