= Lycodon anakradaya =

Scientific classification
- Kingdom: Animalia
- Phylum: Chordata
- Class: Reptilia
- Order: Squamata
- Suborder: Serpentes
- Family: Colubridae
- Genus: Lycodon
- Species: L. anakradaya

Binomial name
- Lycodon anakradaya Nguyen, Duong, Wood, & Grismer, 2022

Species of snake

Lycodon anakradaya is a species of snake found in Vietnam. It eats fish and possibly other prey.
