= Lycodon stormi =

Conservation status
- Vulnerable (IUCN 3.1)

Scientific classification
- Kingdom: Animalia
- Phylum: Chordata
- Class: Reptilia
- Order: Squamata
- Suborder: Serpentes
- Family: Colubridae
- Genus: Lycodon
- Species: L. stormi

Binomial name
- Lycodon stormi Boettger, 1892

Species of snake

Lycodon stormi, the Sulawesi wolf snake, is a species of snake in the family Colubridae.

== Distribution ==
It is found on Sulawesi in Indonesia.
