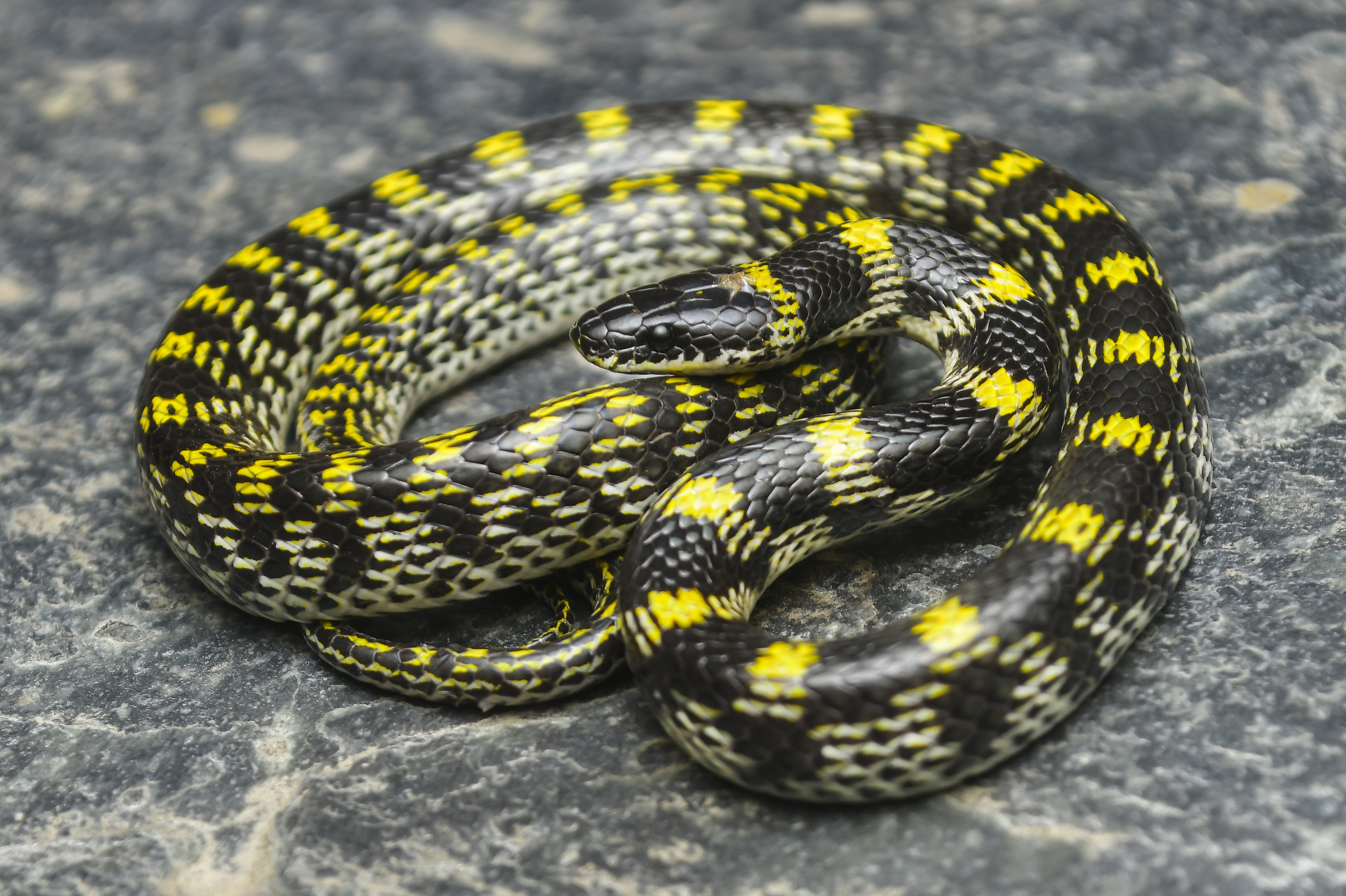

Conservation status
- Near Threatened (IUCN 3.1)

Scientific classification
- Kingdom: Animalia
- Phylum: Chordata
- Class: Reptilia
- Order: Squamata
- Suborder: Serpentes
- Family: Colubridae
- Genus: Lycodon
- Species: L. bicolor

Binomial name
- Lycodon bicolor (Nikolsky, 1903)

Synonyms
- Contia bicolor Nikolsky, 1903; Lycodon mackinnoni Wall, 1906; Ophites mackinnoni (Wall, 1906)

= Lycodon bicolor =

Species of snake

Lycodon bicolor, commonly known as the two-coloured wolf snake, bicolored wolf snake, golden wolf snake, and Mackinnon's wolf snake, is a species of colubrid snake native to the Western Himalayas.

== Distribution ==
Lycodon bicolor is restricted to the western Himalayas, ranging from Uttarakhand in India east through IOK to POK in Pakistan. It was originally described from Mussoorie, but was not found again at its type locality for over 112 years until it was rediscovered in 2019 during survey work in Binog Wildlife Sanctuary; these findings were reported in 2021. As Mussoorie is a major tourist destination, L. bicolor may be threatened by vehicular traffic, pollution, and other tourism-related activities near the sanctuary; due to this, a detailed status survey and further research into the species are required.

== Description ==
Adults may attain a total length of 36.5 cm (14.4 in), which includes a tail 6.5 cm (2.6 in) long. Dorsally, it is brown, with a network of white lines. Ventrally, it is uniformly white, or white with brown-edged ventrals. The dorsal scales are smooth, and are arranged in 17 rows at midbody. The anal plate is divided.

== Habitat ==
The preferred natural habitats of Lycodon bicolor are rocky areas and shrubland, at altitudes of 1,500–2,200 m (4,900–7,200 ft).

== Reproduction ==
Lycodon bicolor is oviparous.
