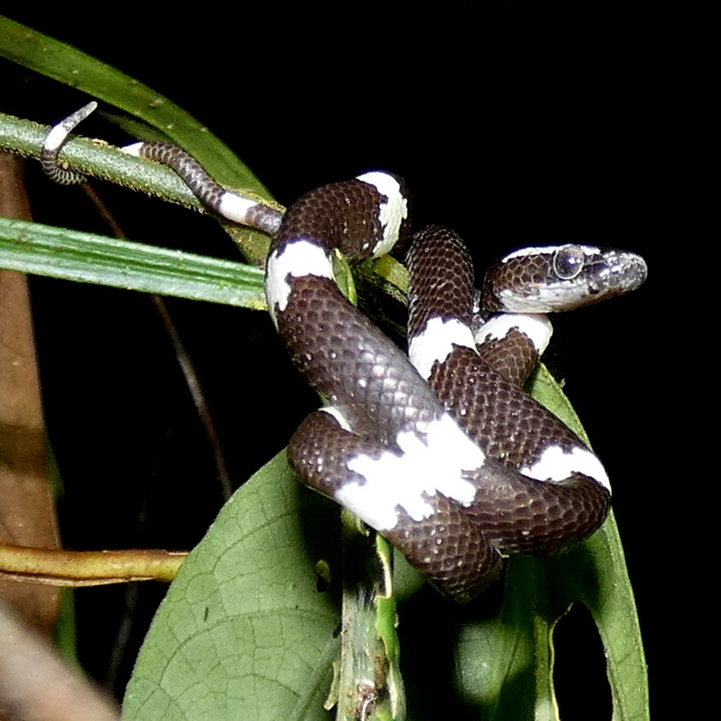

Conservation status
- Least Concern (IUCN 3.1)

Scientific classification
- Kingdom: Animalia
- Phylum: Chordata
- Class: Reptilia
- Order: Squamata
- Suborder: Serpentes
- Family: Colubridae
- Genus: Lycodon
- Species: L. effraenis

Binomial name
- Lycodon effraenis Cantor, 1847

= Lycodon effraenis =

Species of snake

The brown wolf snake (Lycodon effraenis) is a species of snake in the family colubridae. It is found in Malaysia, Brunei, Indonesia, and Thailand.
