= Lycodon dumerilii =

Scientific classification
- Kingdom: Animalia
- Phylum: Chordata
- Class: Reptilia
- Order: Squamata
- Suborder: Serpentes
- Family: Colubridae
- Genus: Lycodon
- Species: L. dumerilii

Binomial name
- Lycodon dumerilii (Boulenger, 1893)

Species of lizard

Lycodon dumerilii, Duméril's wolf snake, is a species of snake found in the Philippines.
