= Lycodon paucifasciatus =

Conservation status
- Vulnerable (IUCN 3.1)

Scientific classification
- Kingdom: Animalia
- Phylum: Chordata
- Class: Reptilia
- Order: Squamata
- Suborder: Serpentes
- Family: Colubridae
- Genus: Lycodon
- Species: L. paucifasciatus

Binomial name
- Lycodon paucifasciatus Rendahl, 1943

Species of snake

Lycodon paucifasciatus , Rendahl's wolf snake, is a species of snake in the family Colubridae.

== Distribution ==
It is found in Vietnam.
