= Lycodon kundui =

Conservation status
- Data Deficient (IUCN 3.1)

Scientific classification
- Kingdom: Animalia
- Phylum: Chordata
- Class: Reptilia
- Order: Squamata
- Suborder: Serpentes
- Family: Colubridae
- Genus: Lycodon
- Species: L. kundui

Binomial name
- Lycodon kundui M.A. Smith, 1943

Species of snake

Lycodon kundui is a species of snake in the subfamily Colubrinae of the family Colubridae. The species is endemic to Myanmar.

== Etymology ==
The specific name, kundui, is in honor of the collector of the holotype, Dr. Kundu of the Harcourt Butler Institute of Public health, Rangoon, Burma (Yangon, Myanmar).

== Description ==
The holotype of L. kundui, a juvenile specimen, has a total length (including tail) of 22.5 cm (8.9 in).

Dorsally, it is bluish black, with narrow white crossbars. Ventrally it is white, including the first row of dorsal scales on each side. The smooth dorsal scales are arranged in 15 rows throughout the length of the body. It has seven upper labials, of which the third and fourth contact the eye. Four lower labials on each side contact the anterior pair of chin shields. The anterior chin shields are much larger than the posterior chin shields.

== Habitat ==
The preferred natural habitat of L. kundui is forest.

== Reproduction ==
L. kundui is oviparous.
