= Lycodon multizonatus =

Conservation status
- Data Deficient (IUCN 3.1)

Scientific classification
- Kingdom: Animalia
- Phylum: Chordata
- Class: Reptilia
- Order: Squamata
- Suborder: Serpentes
- Family: Colubridae
- Genus: Lycodon
- Species: L. multizonatus

Binomial name
- Lycodon multizonatus (Zhao & Y.-M. Jiang, 1981)

Species of snake

Lycodon multizonatus, the Luding wolf snake or Luding kukri snake, is a species of snake in the family Colubridae.

== Distribution ==
It is found in China.
