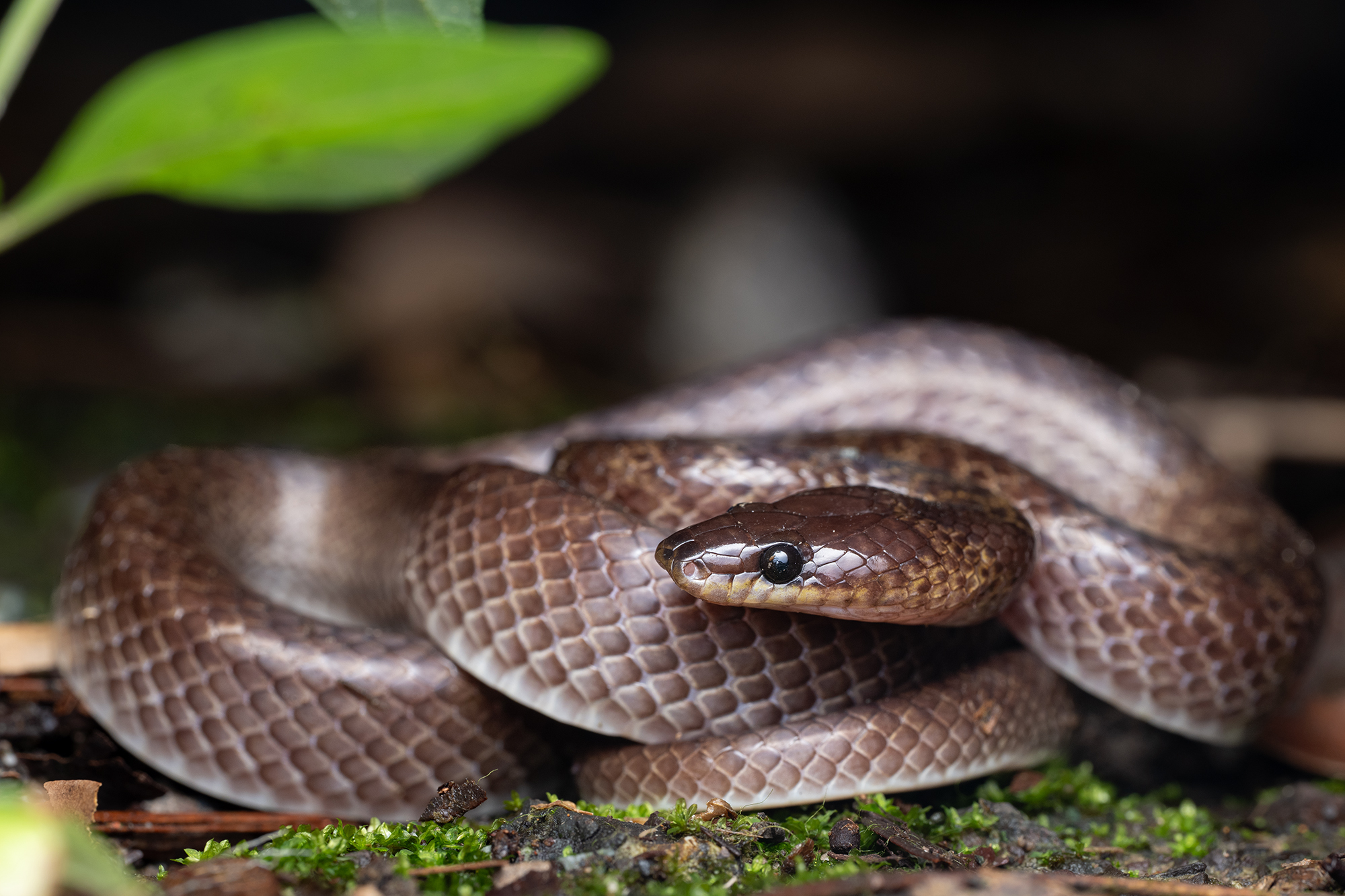
- Lycodon hypsirhinoides from South Andaman

Conservation status
- Least Concern (IUCN 3.1)

Scientific classification
- Kingdom: Animalia
- Phylum: Chordata
- Class: Reptilia
- Order: Squamata
- Suborder: Serpentes
- Family: Colubridae
- Genus: Lycodon
- Species: L. hypsirhinoides

Binomial name
- Lycodon hypsirhinoides (Theobald, 1868)

= Lycodon hypsirhinoides =

Species of snake

Lycodon hypsirhinoides is a species of snake in the family colubridae. It is found in India.
