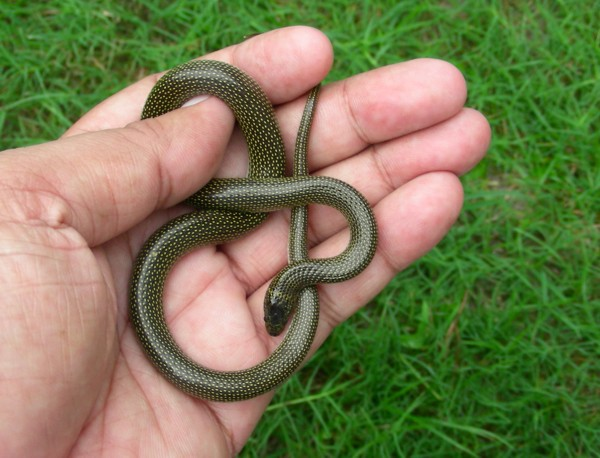
- A twin-spotted wolf snake from North Bengal.

Conservation status
- Least Concern (IUCN 3.1)

Scientific classification
- Kingdom: Animalia
- Phylum: Chordata
- Class: Reptilia
- Order: Squamata
- Suborder: Serpentes
- Family: Colubridae
- Genus: Lycodon
- Species: L. jara

Binomial name
- Lycodon jara (Shaw, 1802)

Synonyms
- Coluber jara Shaw, 1802; Lycodon jara - Schlegel, 1837; Coluber bipunctatus Cantor, 1839; Leptorhytaon jara - Günther, 1858; Lycophidion bipunctatum - Peters, 1863; Lycodon jara - Stoliczka, 1871

= Lycodon jara =

Species of snake

Lycodon jara, commonly known as the twin-spotted wolf snake, is a species of colubrid snake. It is endemic to Asia.

== Distribution ==
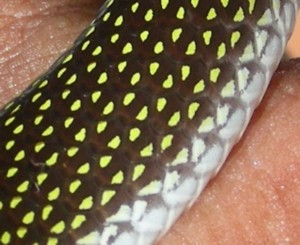
Dorsal scales of Lycodon jara showing the yellow "twin spots" to which the common name refers

Found in Bangladesh, India (Assam, Odisha, Arunachal Pradesh, Manipur, West Bengal and parts of Uttar Pradesh) and Nepal.

== Description ==
Snout much depressed; eye rather small. Rostral much broader than long, just visible from above; internasals much shorter than the prefrontals; frontal as long as or a little shorter than its distance from the end of the snout, a little shorter than the parietals; loreal elongate, not entering the eye; one pre-ocular; two post-oculars; temporals small, 1 + 2; 9 or 10 upper labials, third, fourth, and fifth entering the eye; 4 or 5 lower labials in contact with the anterior chin-shields, which are longer than the posterior.

Dorsal scales smooth, in 17 rows. Ventrals 167–175, not angulate laterally; anal divided; subcaudals 56–63, in two rows.

Coloration in alcohol (for preserved specimens): brown above, each scale with two white dots or short longitudinal lines; labials white; usually a white collar; lower surface uniform white.

Total length 35 cm (13 3/4 inches); tail 6 cm (2 3/8 inches).

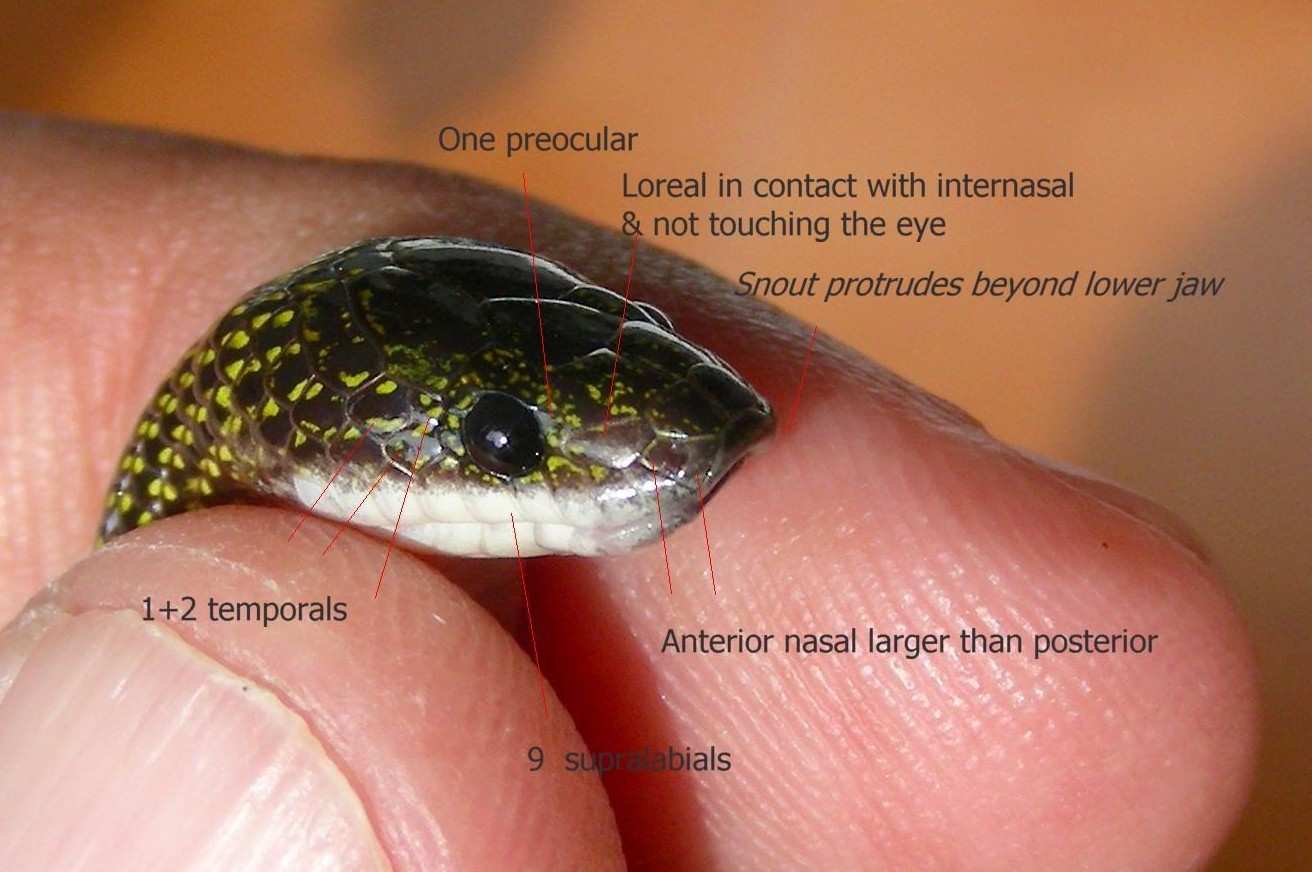

== Gallery ==
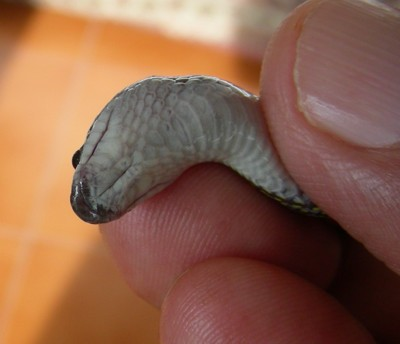

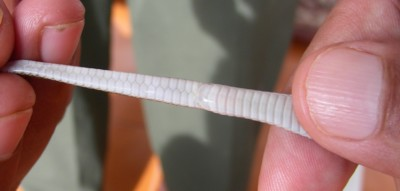

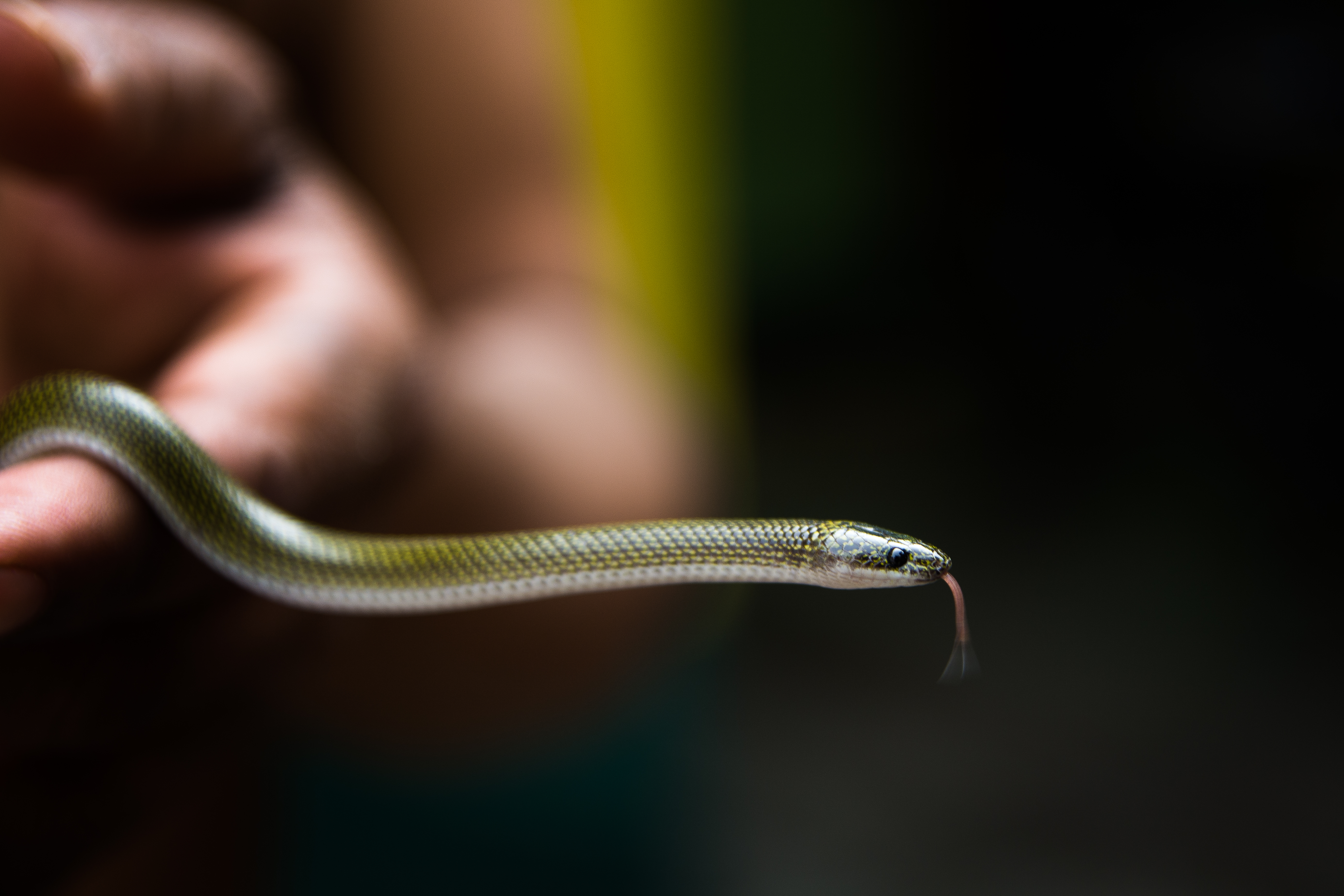
Rescued individual from Jalpaiguri, West Bengal

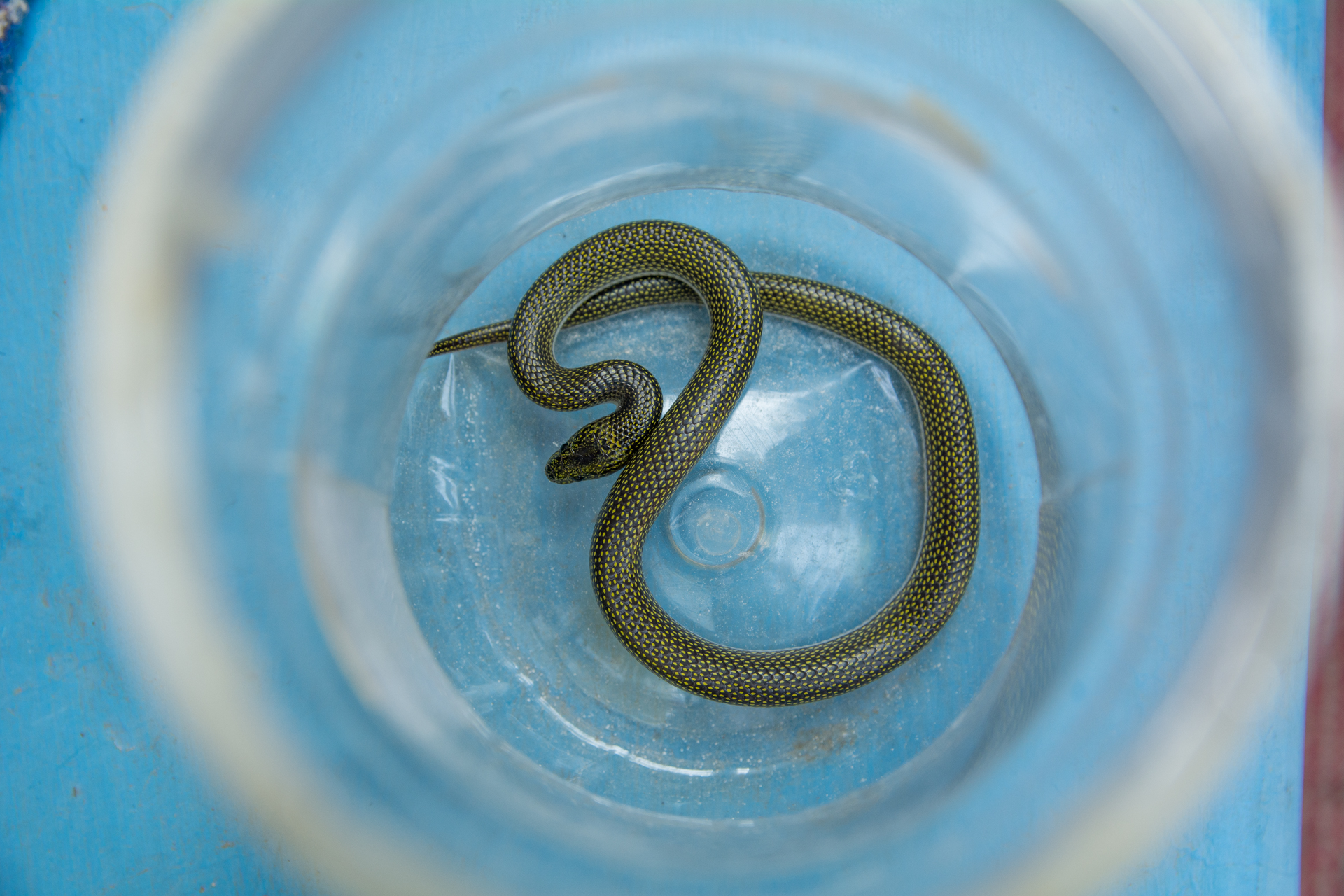

== Other references ==
- Lanza, B. 1999 A new species of Lycodon from the Philippines, with a key to the genus (Reptilia: Serpentes: Colubridae). Tropical Zoology 12: 89-104
