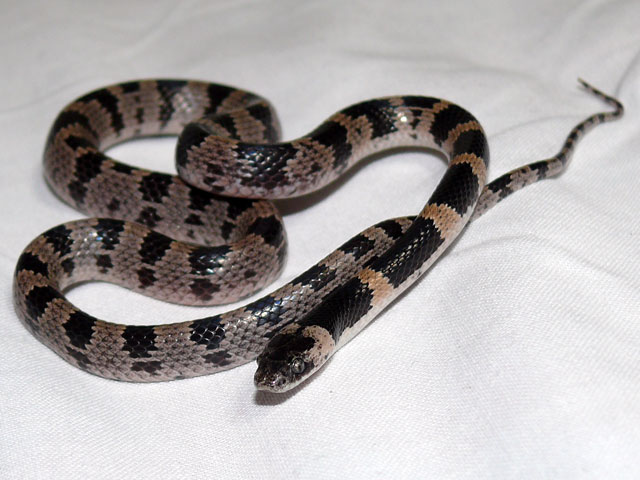

Conservation status
- Least Concern (IUCN 3.1)

Scientific classification
- Kingdom: Animalia
- Phylum: Chordata
- Class: Reptilia
- Order: Squamata
- Suborder: Serpentes
- Family: Colubridae
- Genus: Lycodon
- Species: L. orientalis

Binomial name
- Lycodon orientalis (Hilgendorf, 1880)

Synonyms
- Ophites orientalis Hilgendorf, 1880; Ophites japonicus Günther, 1880

= Oriental odd-tooth snake =

Species of snake

The Oriental odd-tooth snake (Lycodon orientalis), sometimes called the Japanese odd-tooth snake, is a species endemic to Japan, belonging to the family Colubridae. It is found in Hokkaido, Honshu, Shikoku, Kyushu, the Goto Islands, Iki Island, Izu Ōshima, the Oki Islands, Sado Island, Tanegashima, and Yakushima. It has also been reported in Shiashkotan, one of the Chishima Islands.

The snake was first described in 1880 by both Hilgendorf and Günther However, according to Stejneger the description by Hilgendorf was published before that of Günther.

== Description and habitat ==
The full-length snake is about 30–70 cm and has black stripes with a lighter coloured underside. They live in the forest, mainly in the forest floor, and prey upon other snakes, frogs and lizards, such as Achalinus spinalis, the Japanese common toad (Bufo japonicus), Takydromus tachydromoides, and Plestiodon japonicus.
