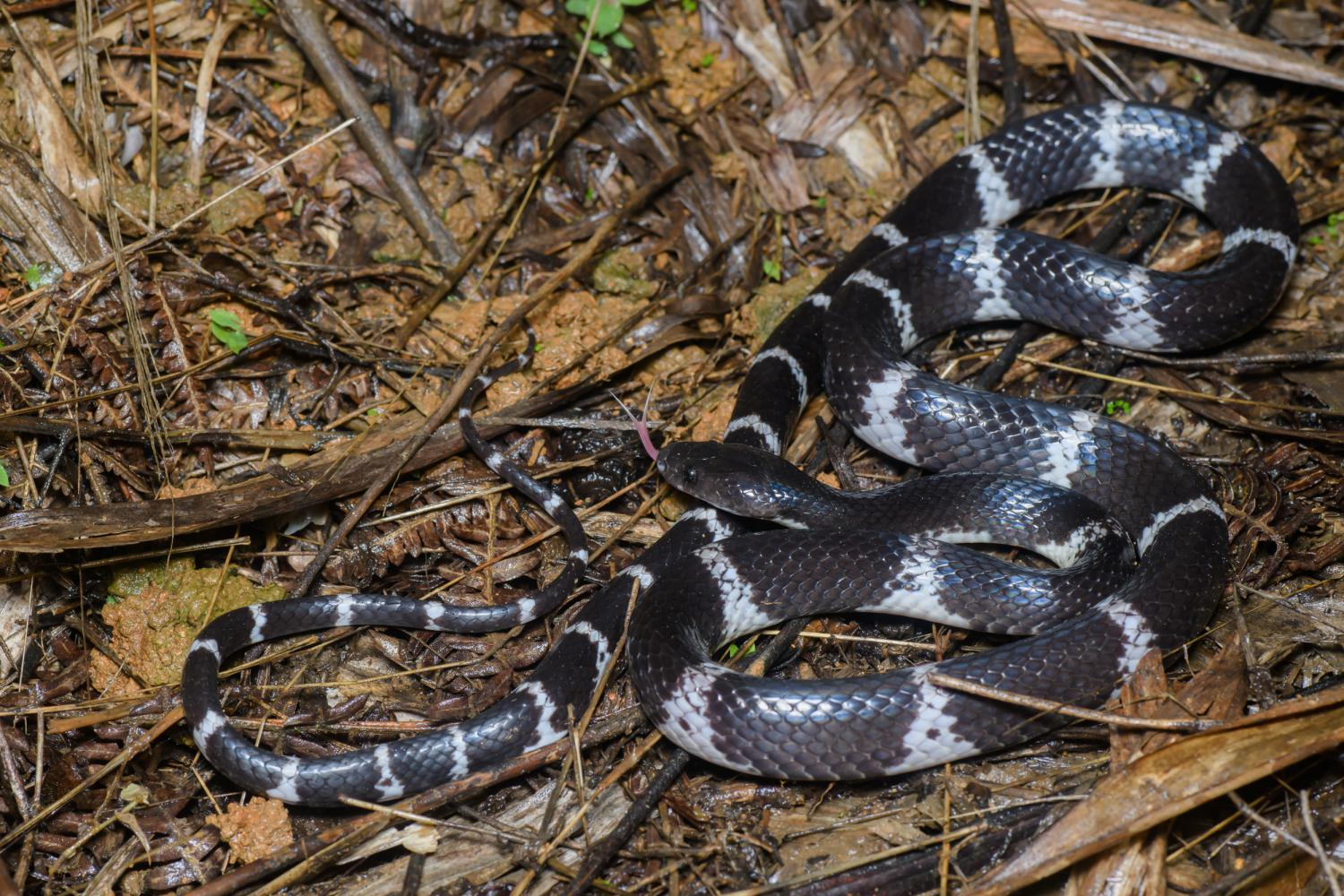

Scientific classification
- Kingdom: Animalia
- Phylum: Chordata
- Class: Reptilia
- Order: Squamata
- Suborder: Serpentes
- Family: Colubridae
- Genus: Lycodon
- Species: L. chapaensis

Binomial name
- Lycodon chapaensis (Angel & Bourret, 1933)

Synonyms
- Dinodon septentrionale subsp. chapaense Angel & Bourret, 1933; Lycodon namdongensis Luu, Ziegler, Ha, Le & Hoang, 2019

= Lycodon chapaensis =

Species of snake

Lycodon chapaensis, the Namdong wolf snake, is a species of snake found in Vietnam and China.
