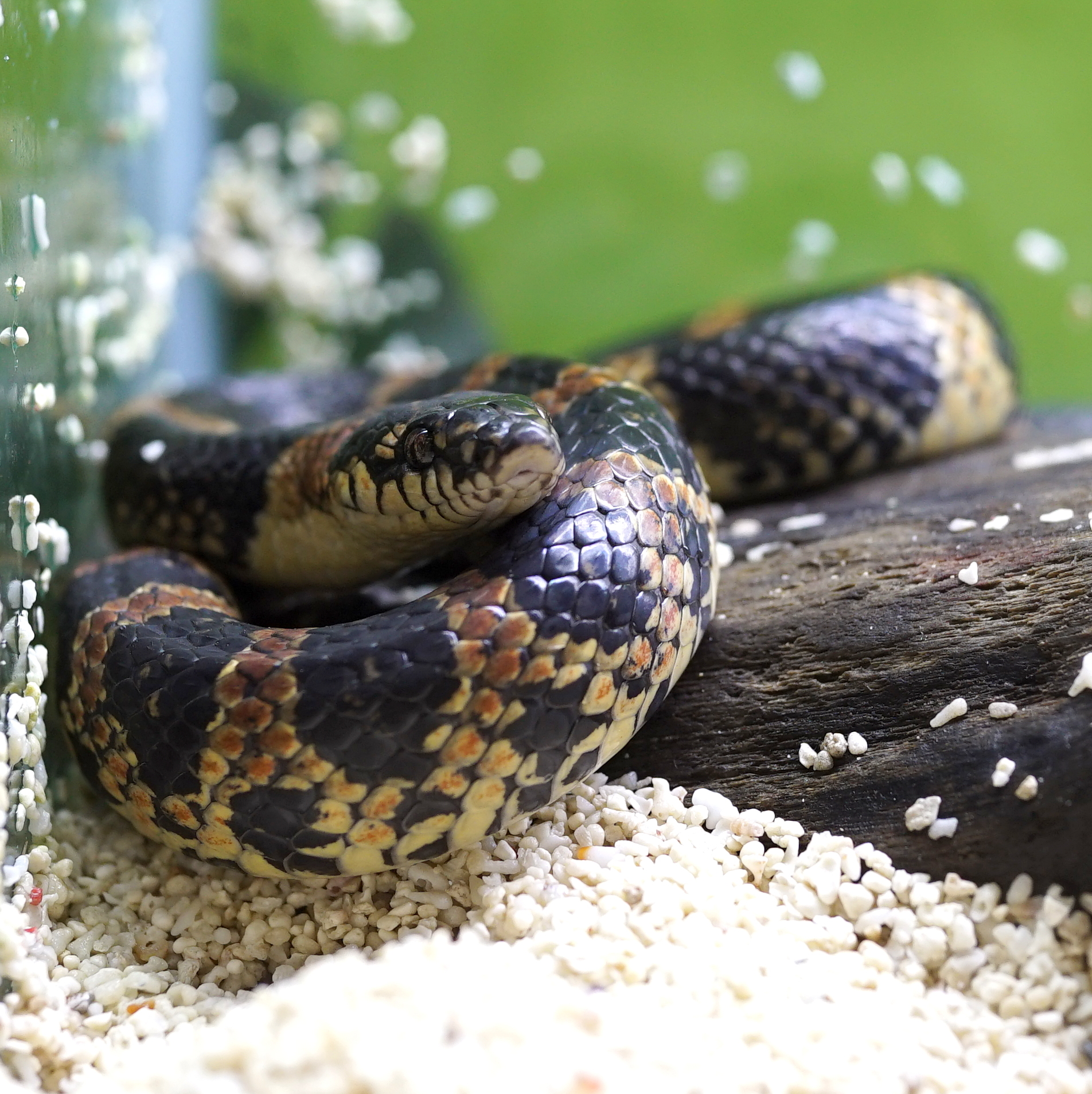

Conservation status
- Least Concern (IUCN 3.1)

Scientific classification
- Kingdom: Animalia
- Phylum: Chordata
- Class: Reptilia
- Order: Squamata
- Suborder: Serpentes
- Family: Colubridae
- Genus: Lycodon
- Species: L. semicarinatus

Binomial name
- Lycodon semicarinatus (Cope, 1860)

= Lycodon semicarinatus =

Species of snake

Lycodon semicarinatus, the Loo-Choo big-tooth snake or Ryukyu odd-tooth snake, is a species of snake in the family Colubridae.

== Distribution ==
It is found in the Ryukyu islands of Japan including Okinawa and Amami Oshima. The species is not venomous.
