= Lycodon sidiki =

Conservation status
- Data Deficient (IUCN 3.1)

Scientific classification
- Kingdom: Animalia
- Phylum: Chordata
- Class: Reptilia
- Order: Squamata
- Suborder: Serpentes
- Family: Colubridae
- Genus: Lycodon
- Species: L. sidiki

Binomial name
- Lycodon sidiki Vogel, Lalremsanga & Vanlalhrima, 2017

Species of snake

Lycodon sidiki is one of seven Sunda Shelf species of snakes in the family Colubridae. It is endemic to Aceh Province, Sumatra.

== Etymology ==
The specific name sidiki is due to honor of Indonesian herpetologist, Irvan Sidik, to his contributions for the herpetology.

== Description ==
The species can identified from other wolf snakes, by the absence of preocular scale and presence of keeled dorsal scales. Smaller snakes have bright orange-red venter and older snakes have creamy venter.
