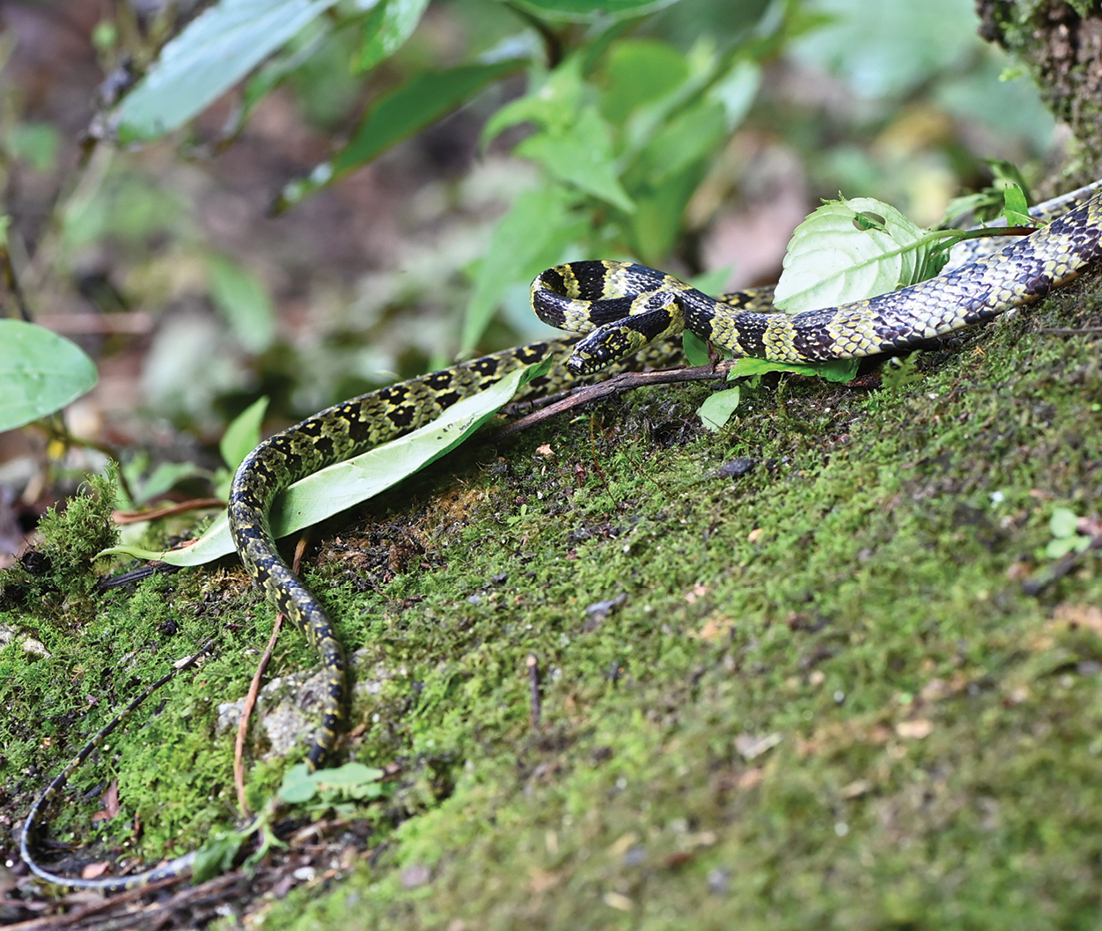
- Lycodon gammiei

Conservation status
- Near Threatened (IUCN 3.1)

Scientific classification
- Kingdom: Animalia
- Phylum: Chordata
- Class: Reptilia
- Order: Squamata
- Suborder: Serpentes
- Family: Colubridae
- Genus: Lycodon
- Species: L. gammiei

Binomial name
- Lycodon gammiei (Blanford, 1878)

Synonyms
- Ophites gammiei Blanford, 1878; Lycodon gammiei — Boulenger, 1890; Dinodon gammiei — Wall, 1923; Lycodon gammiei — Siler et al., 2013

= Lycodon gammiei =

Species of snake

Lycodon gammiei, commonly known as Gammie's wolf snake or the Sikkim false wolf snake, is a species of nonvenomous snake in the family Colubridae. The species is endemic to India.

== Etymology ==
The specific name, gammiei, is in honor of naturalist James Alexander Gammie (1839–1924), who managed a Cinchona plantation in Darjeeling from 1865 to 1897.

== Geographic range ==
Lycodon gammiei is found in northern India, in the states of Arunachal Pradesh and Sikkim, and in Darjeeling district in the state of West Bengal.

== Habitat ==
The preferred natural habitat of L. gammiei is forest.

== Description ==
At first glance, Gammie's wolf snake resembles the venomous kraits. Its body is encircled by alternating dark and light rings with irregular margins. Its head is dark olive, and there are light spots in the center of most head shields. It has an imperfect pale collar, and the underside of the head and neck are whitish. Adults are about 80 cm (32 inches) in total length (including tail).

== Reproduction ==
L. gammiei is oviparous.
