= Lycodon alcalai =

Conservation status
- Least Concern (IUCN 3.1)

Scientific classification
- Kingdom: Animalia
- Phylum: Chordata
- Class: Reptilia
- Order: Squamata
- Suborder: Serpentes
- Family: Colubridae
- Genus: Lycodon
- Species: L. alcalai

Binomial name
- Lycodon alcalai Ota & Ross, 1994

Species of reptile

Lycodon alcalai, also known commonly as Alcala's wolf snake, is a species of snake in the family Colubridae. The species is endemic to the Philippines.

== Etymology ==
The specific name alcalai was chosen to honor the Philippine naturalist Angel Chua Alcala, who made significant contributions to herpetology in the Philippines.

== Taxonomy ==
L. alcalai is a member of the genus Lycodon, a genus of snakes commonly known as wolf snakes. The genus belongs to the snake family Colubridae, the largest snake family, with member species being found on every continent except Antarctica.

== Description ==
L. alcalai has a body that is rounded on the back and flattened on the belly. Its head is distinct from its neck, with a snout that extends further than its lower jaw. The pupil of its eye is a vertical ellipse. The rostral scale is large and triangular, and extends backwards for some distance. The dorsum of the snake and the top of the head are dark brown in color, while the belly and bottom of the head are white or light cream yellow. The holotype for the species has a snout-to-vent length (SVL) of 56 cm (22 in), a tail that is 22.7 cm (8.9 in), and a total length of 78.7 cm (31.0 in). L. alcalai is distinguished from other species in its genus by the lack of a keel or ridge on the scales on its back, as well as the absence of transverse light bands along the body and tail. It most closely resembles the related species L. chrysoprateros.

== Habitat and ecology ==
L. alcalai is oviparous, or egg-laying. The species prefers lowland habitats, not being found more than 320 meters above sea level. It is frequently found in shrubs or on the forest floor, as well as at the edge of the forest, and occasionally in adjacent agricultural fields. It is thought to feed on the eggs of other reptiles, by slitting them open with its blade-like teeth.

== Geographic range and conservation ==
L. alcalai is native to the Philippine islands of Batan and Sabtang. Recent records of the snake exist from Calayan island as well, and the species may also be found on other small islands in the region.

== Conservation status ==
The International Union for Conservation of Nature (IUCN) considers L. alcalai to be a species of "Least Concern", based on a survey in 2009. The islands that it inhabits are well protected, have very few inhabitants, and do not experience anthropogenic environmental disturbances such as hunting or logging.
