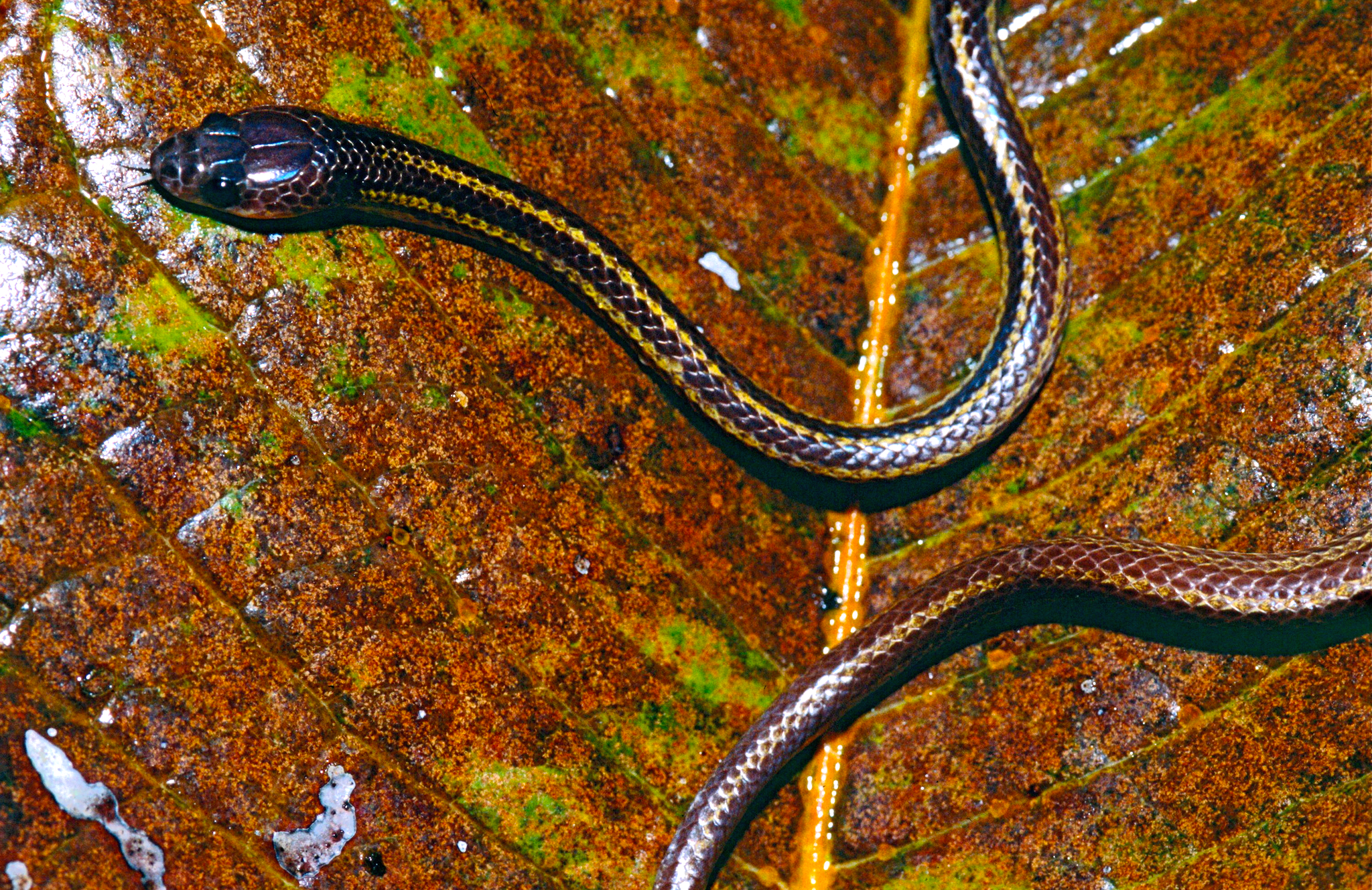

Conservation status
- Least Concern (IUCN 3.1)

Scientific classification
- Kingdom: Animalia
- Phylum: Chordata
- Class: Reptilia
- Order: Squamata
- Suborder: Serpentes
- Family: Colubridae
- Genus: Lycodon
- Species: L. tristrigatus

Binomial name
- Lycodon tristrigatus (Günther, 1858)

= Lycodon tristrigatus =

Species of snake

Lycodon tristrigatus, the three-banded bridled snake, is a species of snake in the family Colubridae.

== Distribution ==
It is found in Indonesia, Brunei, and Malaysia.
