= Lycodon chithrasekarai =

Scientific classification
- Kingdom: Animalia
- Phylum: Chordata
- Class: Reptilia
- Order: Squamata
- Suborder: Serpentes
- Family: Colubridae
- Genus: Lycodon
- Species: L. chithrasekarai

Binomial name
- Lycodon chithrasekarai Wickramasinghe, Vidanapathirana, Pushpamal & Wickramasinghe, 2020

Synonyms
- Lycodon osmanhilli Taylor, 1950

Species of snake

Lycodon chithrasekarai, also known commonly as the Chithrasekara's bridal snake, is a species of snake in the family Colubridae. The species is endemic to Sri Lanka.

== Distribution ==
The snake is recorded from Kanneliya Forest Reserve, Sri Pada Forest, Runa Kanda and Deniyaya areas.
