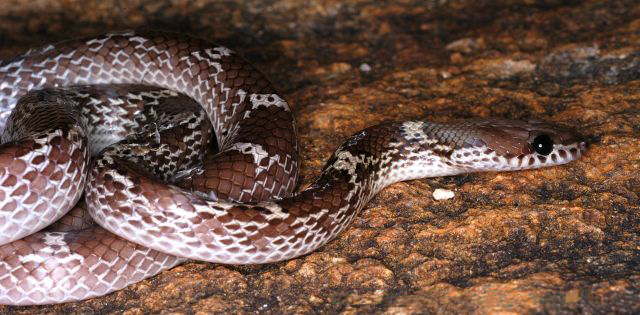
- Lycodon aulicus

Scientific classification
- Kingdom: Animalia
- Phylum: Chordata
- Class: Reptilia
- Order: Squamata
- Suborder: Serpentes
- Family: Colubridae
- Subfamily: Colubrinae
- Genus: Lycodon; Fitzinger, 1826

Species
- See text.

Synonyms
- Cercaspis, Coluber, Leptorhytaon, Ophites, Dryocalamus, Sphecodes, Tetragonosoma, Tytleria

= Lycodon =

Genus of snakes

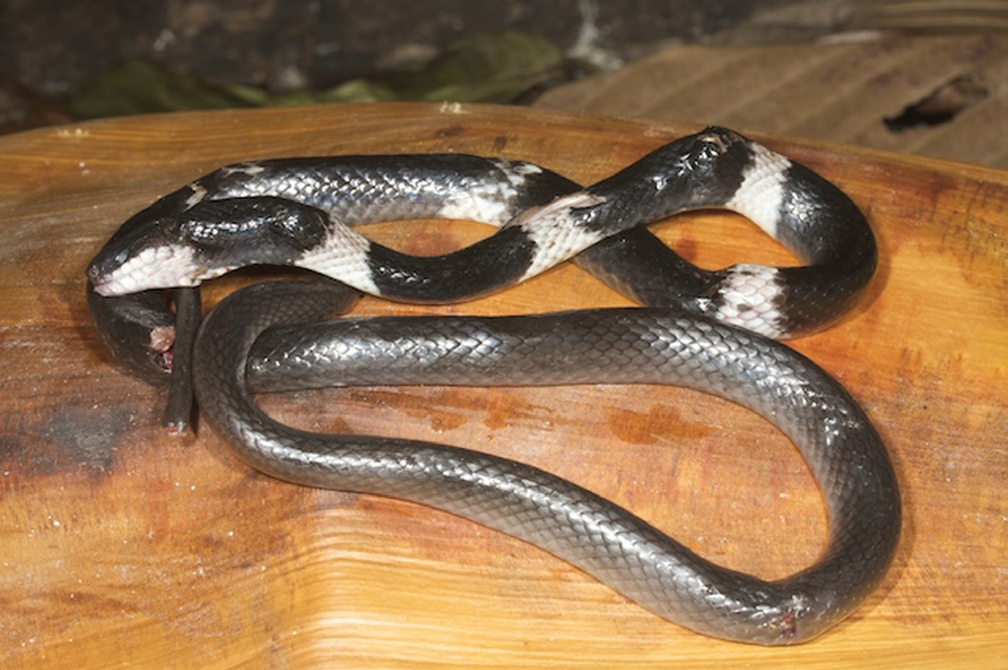
Lycodon subcinctus, Malayan banded wolfsnake, in Letefoho, East Timor

Lycodon is a genus of snakes, commonly known as wolf snakes, in the subfamily Colubrinae of the family Colubridae.The Neo-Latin name Lycodon is derived from the Greek words λύκος (lykos) meaning wolf and οδόν (odon) meaning tooth, and refers to the fang-like anterior maxillary and mandibular teeth. The species in the genus Lycodon are nonvenomous, but many members strongly resemble the venomous kraits (genus Bungarus) in appearance, an example of Batesian mimicry.

== Fossil record ==
Fossils of Lycodon are known from the Early Pliocene of Henan.

== Species ==
The genus Lycodon comprises 79 species which are recognized as being valid.

- Lycodon albofuscus (A.M.C. Duméril, Bibron & A.H.A. Duméril, 1854) – dark wolf snake
- Lycodon alcalai Ota & Ross, 1994 – Alcala's wolf snake
- Lycodon anakradaya A.T. Nguyen, Duong, Wood & Grismer, 2022
- Lycodon aulicus (Linnaeus, 1758) – Indian wolf snake, common wolf snake
- Lycodon banksi Luu et al., 2018 – Banks's wolf snake
- Lycodon bibonius Ota & Ross, 1994 – Ota's wolf snake
- Lycodon bicolor (Nikolsky, 1903) – Mackinnon's wolf snake
- Lycodon butleri Boulenger, 1900 – Butler's wolf snake
- Lycodon calcarophilus G. Vogel, Bragin, Poyarkov & T.V. Nguyen, 2025 – limestone wolf snake
- Lycodon capucinus F. Boie, 1827 – common wolf snake
- Lycodon cardamomensis Daltry & Wüster, 2002
- Lycodon carinatus (Kuhl, 1820) – Ceylon wolf snake
- Lycodon cathaya J. Wang, Qi, Lyu, Zeng & Y.-Y. Wang, 2020 – Huaping wolf snake
- Lycodon cavernicolus Grismer, Quah, Anuar, Muin, Wood & Nor, 2014 – Gua Wang Burma wolf snake
- Lycodon chapaensis (Angel & Bourret, 1933) – Namdong wolf snake
- Lycodon chithrasekarai (Wickramasinghe et al., 2020) – Chithrasekara's bridle snake
- Lycodon chrysoprateros Ota & Ross, 1994 – Ross's wolf snake
- Lycodon davidi G. Vogel et al., 2012 – David's wolf snake
- Lycodon davisonii (Blanford, 1878) – Blanford's bridal snake
- Lycodon deccanensis Ganesh, Deuti, Punith, Achyuthan, Mallik, Adhikari & G. Vogel, 2020
- Lycodon dumerili (Boulenger, 1893) – Duméril's wolf snake
- Lycodon duytan T.V. Nguyen, Poyarkov & G. Vogel, 2025
- Lycodon effraenis Cantor, 1847 – brown wolf snake
- Lycodon fasciatus (J. Anderson, 1879)
- Lycodon fasciolatus (Shaw, 1802) – banded wolf snake
- Lycodon fausti Gaulke, 2002 – Faust's wolf snake
- Lycodon ferroni Lanza, 1999 – Ferron's Asian wolf snake
- Lycodon flavicollis Mukherjee & Bhupathy, 2007 – yellow-collared wolf snake
- Lycodon flavomaculatus Wall, 1907 – yellow-spotted wolf snake
- Lycodon flavozonatus (Pope, 1928) – yellow-banded big tooth snake, yellow-spotted wolf snake, big-tooth snake
- Lycodon futsingensis (Pope, 1928)
- Lycodon gammiei (Blanford, 1878) – Gammie's wolf snake, Sikkim false wolf snake
- Lycodon gibsonae G. Vogel & David, 2019 – Gibson's wolf snake
- Lycodon gongshan G. Vogel & Luo, 2011 – Gongshan wolf snake
- Lycodon gracilis (Günther, 1864) – scarce bridal snake
- Lycodon hypsirhinoides (Theobald, 1868)
- Lycodon irwini Naveen, Mirza, Choure & Chandramouli, 2025 – Irwin's wolf snake
- Lycodon jara (Shaw, 1802) – twin-spotted wolf snake
- Lycodon kundui M.A. Smith, 1943
- Lycodon laoensis Günther, 1864 – Laotian wolf snake
- Lycodon latifasciatus T.V. Nguyen, Lee, K. Jiang, Ding, Chit, Poyarkov & G. Vogel, 2025 – East Himalayan banded wolf snake
- Lycodon liuchengchaoi Zhang et al., 2011
- Lycodon muelleri A.M.C. Duméril, Bibron & A.H.A. Duméril, 1854 – Müller's wolf snake
- Lycodon multifasciatus (Maki, 1931)
- Lycodon multizonatus (Zhao & Y.-M. Jiang, 1981) – Luding wolf snake, Luding kukri snake
- Lycodon namdongensis Luu, Ziegler, Ha, Le & Hoang, 2019
- Lycodon neomaculatus T.V. Nguyen, Lee, Pauwels, Kennedy-Gold, Poyarkov, David & G. Vogel, 2024 – Indochinese banded wolfsnake
- Lycodon nympha (Daudin, 1803) – Vellore bridal snake
- Lycodon obvelatus K. Wang, Yu, G. Vogel & Che, 2020 – recluse wolf snake
- Lycodon ophiophagus G. Vogel et al., 2009 – snake-eater wolf snake
- Lycodon orientalis (Hilgendorf, 1880) – Oriental odd-tooth snake
- Lycodon paucifasciatus Rendahl in M.A. Smith, 1943 – Rendahl's wolf snake
- Lycodon philippinus (Griffin, 1909) – Philippine dryocalamus
- Lycodon pictus Janssen, Pham, Ngo, Le, T.Q. Nguyen & Ziegler, 2019
- Lycodon poyarkovii T.V. Nguyen & G. Vogel, 2025 – Poyarkov's big-tooth snake
- Lycodon rosozonatus (Hu & Zhao, 1972) – rose big-tooth snake
- Lycodon rufozonatus Cantor, 1842 – red-banded snake
- Lycodon ruhstrati (Fischer, 1886) – mountain wolf snake, Formosa wolf snake
- Lycodon sealei Leviton, 1955 – Seale's banded Asian wolf snake
- Lycodon semicarinatus (Cope, 1860) – Loo-Choo big-tooth snake, Ryukyu odd-tooth snake
- Lycodon septentrionalis (Günther, 1875) – white-banded wolf snake, northern large-toothed snake
- Lycodon serratus K. Wang, Yu, G. Vogel & Che, 2020 – serrate-banded wolf snake
- Lycodon sidiki Wostl, Hamidy, Kurniawan & E.N. Smith, 2017
- Lycodon solivagus Ota & Ross, 1994 – common wolf snake
- Lycodon stormi Boettger, 1892 – Sulawesi wolf snake
- Lycodon striatus (Shaw, 1802) – northern wolf snake, barred wolf snake
- Lycodon subannulatus (A.M.C. Duméril, Bibron & A.H.A. Duméril, 1854) – Malayan bridal snake, southern bridle snake
- Lycodon subcinctus F. Boie, 1827 – Malayan banded wolf snake
- Lycodon synaptor G. Vogel & David, 2010 – Boehme's wolf snake
- Lycodon tessellatus Jan, 1863 – Manila wolf snake
- Lycodon tiwarii Biswas & Sanyal, 1965 – Andaman wolf snake
- Lycodon travancoricus (Beddome, 1870) – Travancore wolf snake
- Lycodon tristrigatus (Günther, 1858)
- Lycodon truongi A.T. Nguyen, Duong, Wood & Grismer, 2022 – Truong's wolf snake
- Lycodon walli (Stejneger, 1907) – Wall's red-banded snake
- Lycodon yunnanensis (F. Werner, 1922) – Yunnan wolf snake
- Lycodon zawi Slowinski et al., 2001 – Zaw's wolf snake
- Lycodon zayuensis K. Jiang, Y.-F. Wang, Jin & Che, 2020
- Lycodon zoosvictoriae Neang, Hartmann, Seiha, Souter & Furey, 2014 – Zoos Victoria's wolf snake

Nota bene: A binomial authority in parentheses indicates that the species was originally described in a genus other than Lycodon.
