= Lycodon zawi =

Conservation status
- Least Concern (IUCN 3.1)

Scientific classification
- Kingdom: Animalia
- Phylum: Chordata
- Class: Reptilia
- Order: Squamata
- Suborder: Serpentes
- Family: Colubridae
- Genus: Lycodon
- Species: L. zawi

Binomial name
- Lycodon zawi Slowinski et al., 2001

Species of snake

Lycodon zawi, commonly known as Zaw's wolf snake, is a species of nonvenomous snake in the family Colubridae. The species is native to South Asia and Southeast Asia

== Etymology ==
The specific name, zawi, is in honor of U Khin Maung Zaw, Director of the Myanmar Nature and Wildlife Conservation Division.

== Geographic range ==
L. zawi is found in Bangladesh, northeastern India (Assam, Meghalaya, Mizoram, Tripura), and Myanmar (formerly called Burma).

== Description ==
Dorsally, L. zawi is brownish black with white crossbands. Ventrally, it is cream-colored. It can grow to 48 cm (19 inches) in total length (including tail).

== Habitat ==
Zaw's wolf snake was discovered dwelling in forests and near streams at elevations of less than 500 m (1,600 ft) in Assam, India, including Garbhange Reserve Forest, and in northern Myanmar.

== Diet ==
L. zawi feeds mainly on small lizards such as skinks and geckos.

== Reproduction ==
L. zawi is oviparous.
