= Lycodon bibonius =

Conservation status
- Data Deficient (IUCN 3.1)

Scientific classification
- Kingdom: Animalia
- Phylum: Chordata
- Class: Reptilia
- Order: Squamata
- Suborder: Serpentes
- Family: Colubridae
- Genus: Lycodon
- Species: L. bibonius

Binomial name
- Lycodon bibonius Ota & Ross, 1994

Species of snake

Lycodon bibonius, also known as Ota's wolf snake, is a species of colubrid snake found on the islands of Camiguin Norte and Babuyan Claro in the Philippines.

== Etymology ==
The species name "bibonius" is derived from the Latin word "bibo," meaning "to drink." The name was chosen by Hidetoshi Ota and Charles Ross, the biologists who described the snake, in honor of their colleague R. I. Crombie, "who, often while sharing beverages, has shared his expertise and friendship without reservation."

== Description ==
The head of Lycodon bibonius is distinct from the neck and slightly flattened. The snout projects forward beyond the lower jaw. The body of the snake is cylindrical, slightly flattened on the belly. The rostral scale is large and triangular, clearly visible from above the snake. The body of the snake is dark brown, with lighter stripes across the back and tail. These stripes are narrower than the spaces between them, and are narrowest on the spine, broadening as they descend down the side of the snake. A holotype for the species had a snout-to-vent length of 37.1 centimetres and a tail-length of 14 centimetres, giving it a total length of 51.1 centimetres.

Lycodon bibonius is distinguished from other Lycodon species by the fact that its upper pre-ocular scale is larger than the lower scale, as well by the presence of 16-21 lighter bands across its back and tail.

== Reproduction ==
Lycodon bibonius is oviparous, or egg-laying.

== Phylogeny ==
Lycodon bibonius is a member of the genus Lycodon, a genus of snakes commonly known as wolf snakes. The genus belongs to the snake family Colubridae, the largest snake family, with member species being found on every continent except Antarctica.

== Habitat and ecology ==
During the day, the species is found on the leaf axils of palm trees. During the night, it is found on tree trunks. It has been observed in both forested and agricultural areas. They are known to eat skinks.

== Distribution ==
Prior to 2004, Lycodon bibonius was only known from the volcanic island of Camiguin Norte in the Babuyan island group in the Philippines. In 2006, it was newly observed on the island of Babuyan Claro, within the same island group. The size of their range is less than 300 square kilometres.

== Conservation ==
Despite the range of the snake being limited to 300 square kilometers, the International Union for Conservation of Nature considers Lycodon alcalai to be a species of least concern, based on a survey in 2007. The island of Babuyan is within a proposed protected zone, and both Babuyan and Camiguin have an extremely low population density. The species is common within its limited range, and its population is thought to be stable. The loss of forest habitats might pose a threat to it on Camiguin island.
