= Lycodon solivagus =

Conservation status
- Data Deficient (IUCN 3.1)

Scientific classification
- Kingdom: Animalia
- Phylum: Chordata
- Class: Reptilia
- Order: Squamata
- Suborder: Serpentes
- Family: Colubridae
- Genus: Lycodon
- Species: L. solivagus

Binomial name
- Lycodon solivagus Ota & Ross, 1994

Species of snake

Lycodon solivagus, also known as the common wolf snake, is a species of colubrid snake found on Luzon Island in the Philippines.

== Etymology ==
The species name solivagus is derived from the Latin words solus and vagus, which mean "wandering alone." The name was chosen by the biologists who described the species because the individual they captured was found wandering alone.

== Description ==
The head of Lycodon solivagus is distinct from its neck, and slightly flattened. The snout of the snake is pointed, and extends beyond the lower jaw. The pupils are circular. The body of the snake is roughly cylindrical, rounded on the back and flattened on the belly. The rostral scale is large and triangular, extending backwards behind the eyes and clearly visible from above. The body of the snake is dark brown in color, with white transverse stripes across the forward three-quarters of the body. The stripes are narrower towards the spine and broader towards the sides, with dark brown spots which get more numerous towards the rear. The belly of the snake is ivory in color. A holotype for the species had a snout-to-vent length of 67 centimeters, and a tail-length of 27.6 centimeters, giving it a total length of 94.6 centimeters.

== Reproduction ==
Lycodon solivagus is oviparous, or egg laying.

== Phylogeny ==
Lycodon solivagus is a member of the genus Lycodon, a genus of snakes commonly known as wolf snakes. The genus belongs to the snake family Colubridae, the largest snake family, with member species being found on every continent except Antarctica.

== Habitat and ecology ==
The species is thought to inhabit shrubbery, with the holotype being captured in a shrub 2 meters above the ground.

== Distribution ==
The species is only known from the northern portion of Cordillera Central, in Luzon Island in the Philippines. Evidence suggests that it is a lowland species.

== Conservation ==
The abundance and distribution of this species are poorly known due to it being a recently identified species; therefore, Lycodon solivagus is classified by the IUCN Red List as being "Data Deficient." Potential threats to its existence remain poorly known.
