= Lycodon zayuensis =

Scientific classification
- Kingdom: Animalia
- Phylum: Chordata
- Class: Reptilia
- Order: Squamata
- Suborder: Serpentes
- Family: Colubridae
- Genus: Lycodon
- Species: L. zayuensis

Binomial name
- Lycodon zayuensis K. Jiang, Wang, Jin, & Che, 2020

Species of snake

Lycodon zayuensis is a species of snake in the family Colubridae.

== Distribution ==
It is found in Tibet.
