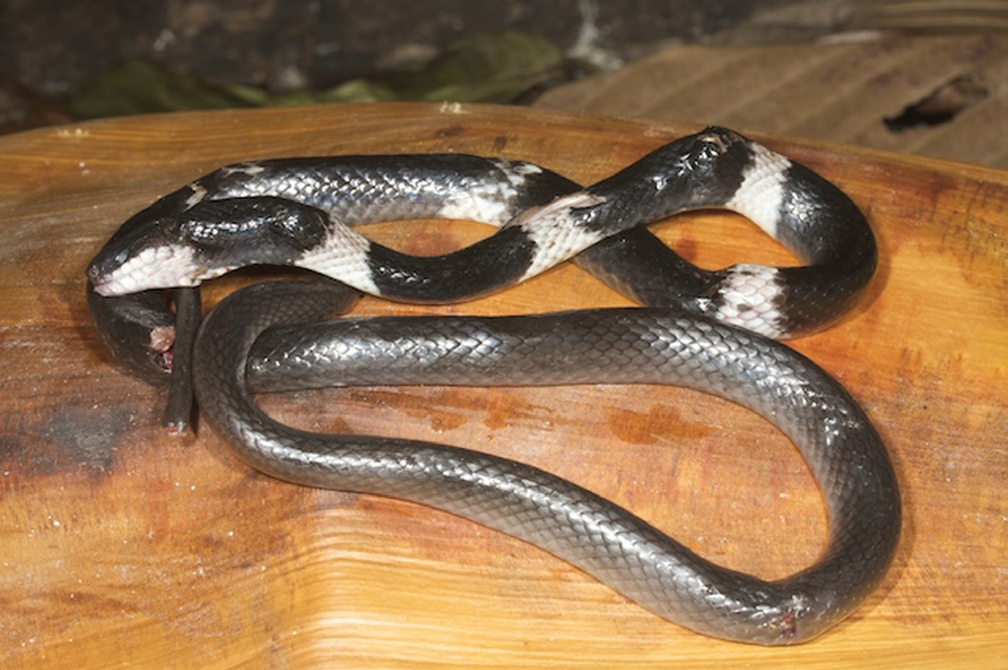

Conservation status
- Least Concern (IUCN 3.1)

Scientific classification
- Kingdom: Animalia
- Phylum: Chordata
- Class: Reptilia
- Order: Squamata
- Suborder: Serpentes
- Family: Colubridae
- Genus: Lycodon
- Species: L. subcinctus

Binomial name
- Lycodon subcinctus Boie, 1827

= Lycodon subcinctus =

Species of snake

Lycodon subcinctus, commonly known as the Malayan banded wolf snake, is a species of snake of the family Colubridae. This snake has banded pattern that resembles a Krait.

== Geographic range ==
The snake is found in Asia.

== Subspecies ==
- Lycodon subcinctus maculatus (Cope, 1895)
- Lycodon subcinctus subcinctus Boie, 1827
