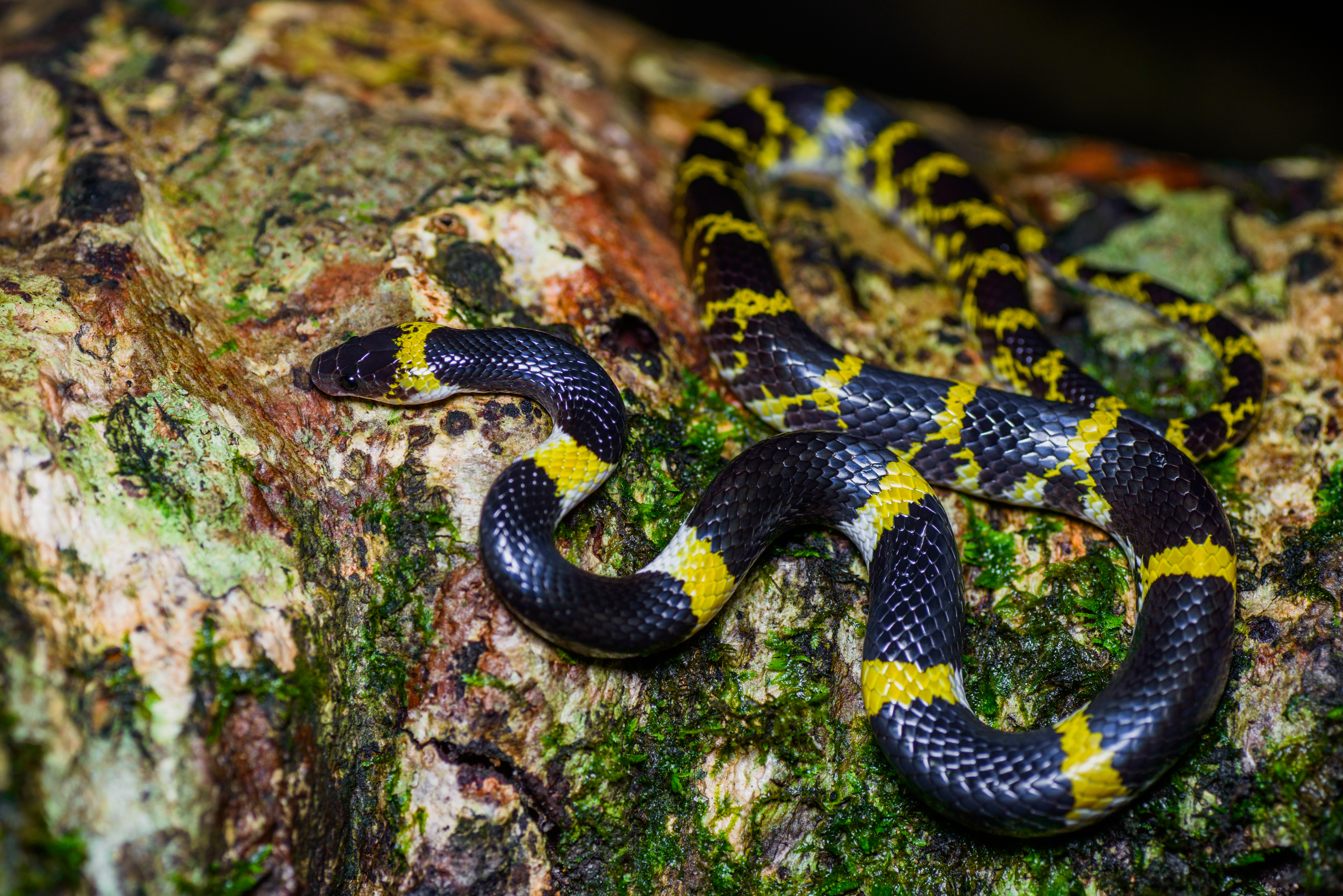
- specimen at Khao Chamao Waterfall, Khao Chamao–Khao Wong National Park

Conservation status
- Least Concern (IUCN 3.1)

Scientific classification
- Kingdom: Animalia
- Phylum: Chordata
- Class: Reptilia
- Order: Squamata
- Suborder: Serpentes
- Family: Colubridae
- Genus: Lycodon
- Species: L. laoensis

Binomial name
- Lycodon laoensis Günther, 1864

Synonyms
- Ophites laoensis - Zhao & Adler, 1993

= Lycodon laoensis =

Species of snake

Lycodon laoensis, commonly known as the Laotian wolf snake, is a species of non-venomous colubrid snake endemic to Asia.

== Geographic range ==
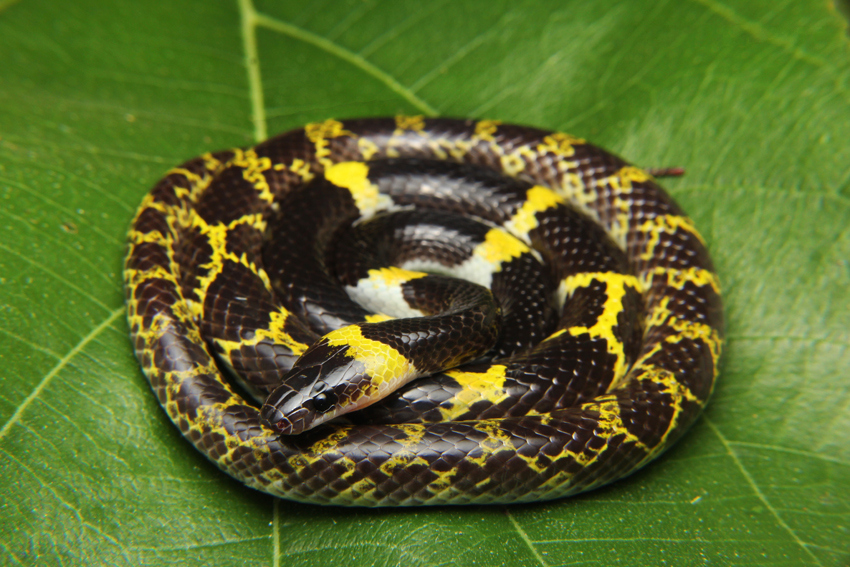
Lycodon laoensis from Kaeng Krachan National Park

It is found in India, Thailand, Laos, Vietnam, Cambodia, China (Yunnan), West Malaysia and Myanmar.

== Description ==
Dorsally it is dark brown, with a whitish or yellowish crossband on the occiput, and similar body crossbands which bifurcate on the sides. Ventrally it is whitish. Adults are about .5 m (20 inches) in total length, which includes the tail of about 10 cm (4 inches).

They are nocturnal, and generally ground dwelling. They are not very aggressive and generally reluctant to bite.

Like other Wolf Snakes, they can be mistaken for the venomous Banded Kraits.
