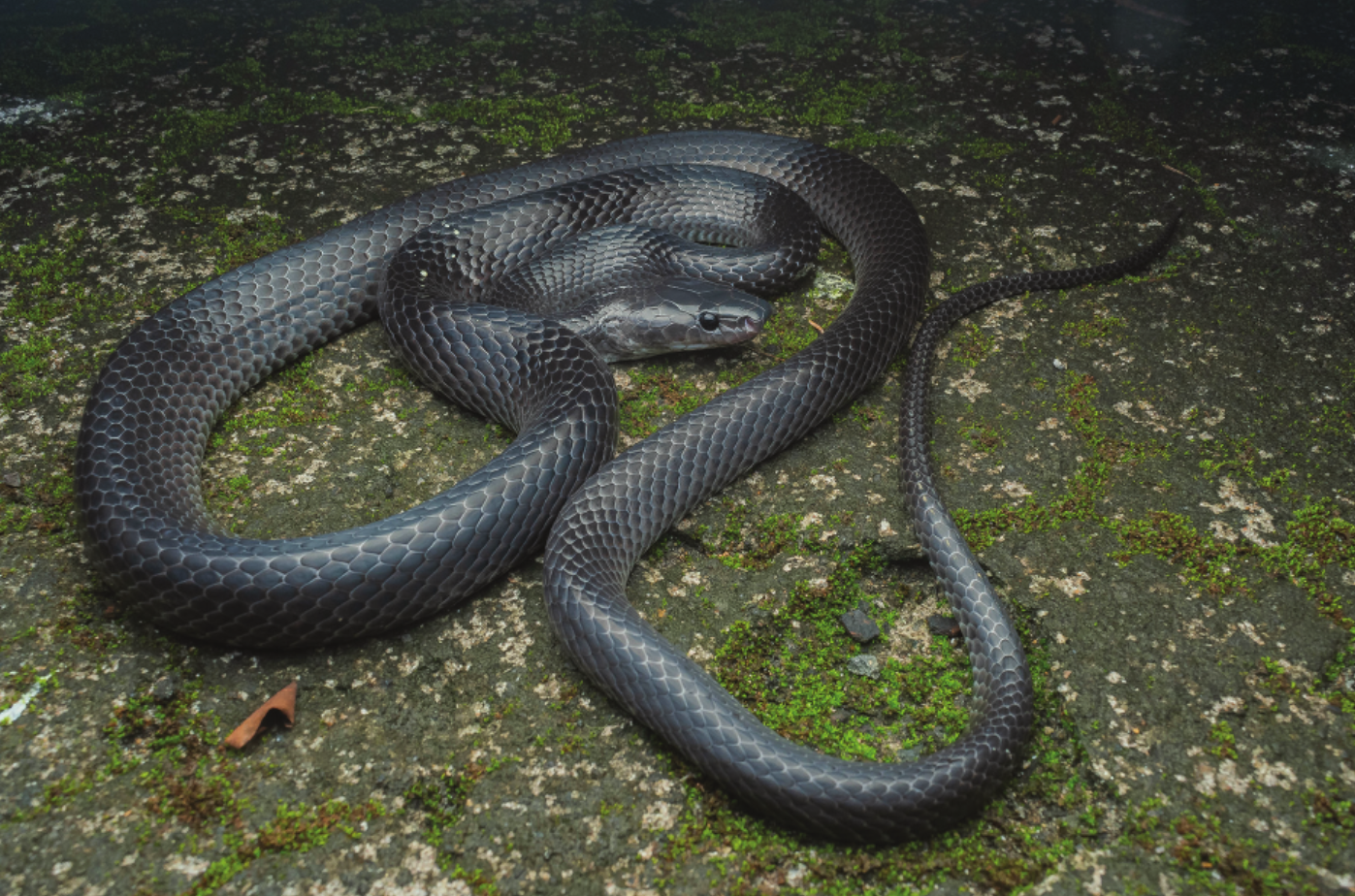
- Female

Conservation status
- Endangered (IUCN 3.1)

Scientific classification
- Kingdom: Animalia
- Phylum: Chordata
- Class: Reptilia
- Order: Squamata
- Suborder: Serpentes
- Family: Colubridae
- Genus: Lycodon
- Species: L. irwini

Binomial name
- Lycodon irwini Naveen, Mirza,Choure and Chandramouli, 2025

= Lycodon irwini =

Species of snake

Lycodon irwini, or Irwin's wolf snake, is a species of snake in the family Colubridae. It is native to the Nicobar Islands of India.

== Etymology ==
The specific name of the species, irwini , is a patronym honouring Steve Irwin, an Australian zookeeper and conservationist who died in an accident involving a stingray.

== Description ==
Lycodon irwini on average reaches a length of about 71 to 84 centimeters (27.9 to 33 inches), in rare instances going up to 119 centimeters (46.8 inches). The body is slender, with a long tail gradually tapering to a whitish terminal scute. The head is oblong-shaped and slightly flattened. It has an average tail length of 16 to 18 centimeters (6.2 to 7 inches).

== Distribution and habitat ==
Lycodon irwini favors moist evergreen forests. It is only known from Great Nicobar Island, suggesting it may be endemic to the island.
