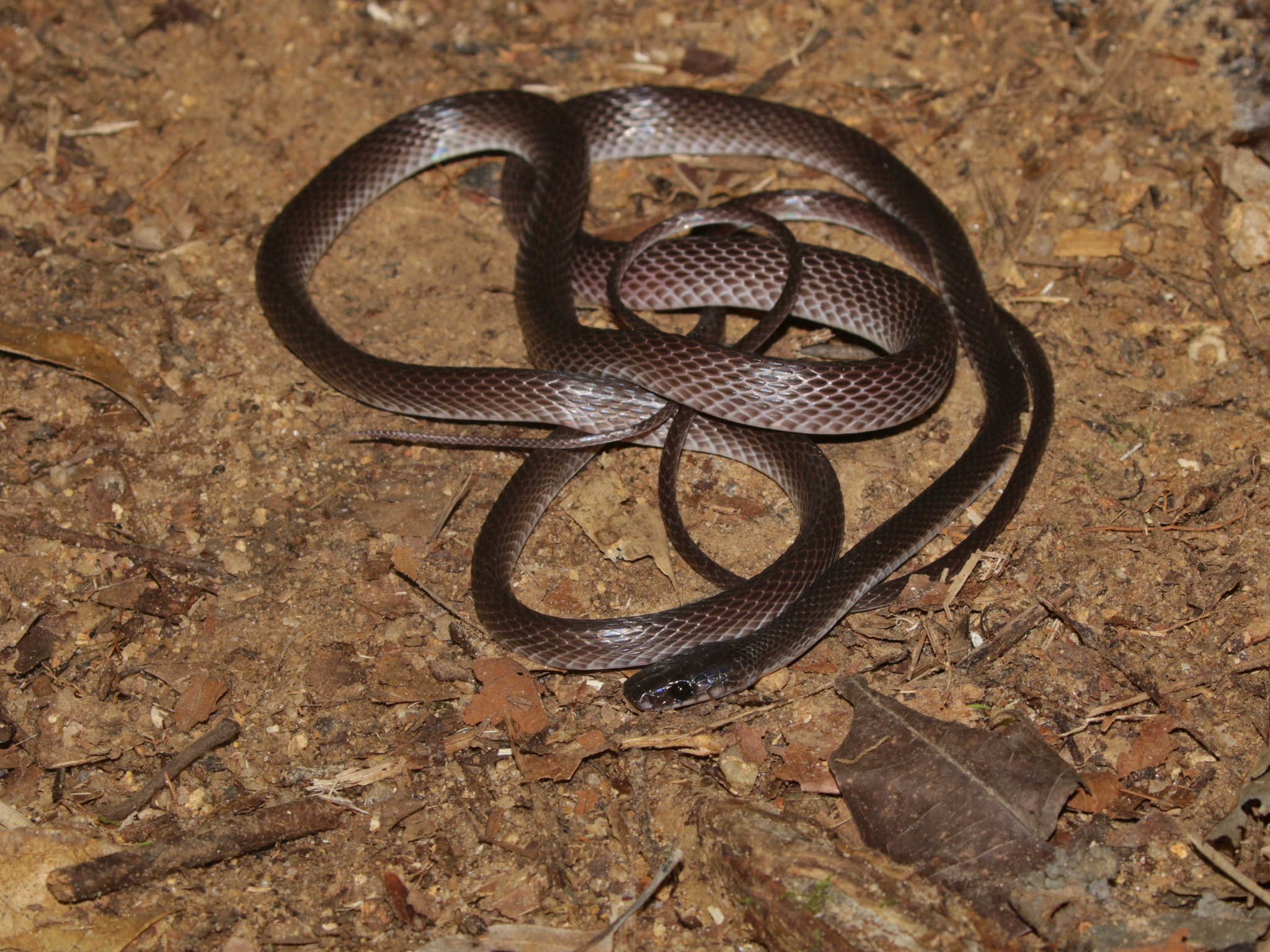

Conservation status
- Least Concern (IUCN 3.1)

Scientific classification
- Kingdom: Animalia
- Phylum: Chordata
- Class: Reptilia
- Order: Squamata
- Suborder: Serpentes
- Family: Colubridae
- Genus: Lycodon
- Species: L. albofuscus

Binomial name
- Lycodon albofuscus (Duméril, Bibron & Duméril, 1854)

Synonyms
- Lepturophis albofuscus Duméril, Bibron & Duméril, 1854; Lepturophis borneensis Boulenger, 1900; Sphecodes albo-fuscus Duméril, Bibron & Duméril, 1854

= Dark wolf snake =

Species of snake

The dark wolf snake (Lycodon albofuscus) is a species of snake in the family colubridae. It is found in Asia. It probably eats frogs.
