= Lycodon zoosvictoriae =

Scientific classification
- Kingdom: Animalia
- Phylum: Chordata
- Class: Reptilia
- Order: Squamata
- Suborder: Serpentes
- Family: Colubridae
- Genus: Lycodon
- Species: L. zoosvictoriae

Binomial name
- Lycodon zoosvictoriae Neang, Hartmann, Seiha, Souter & Furey, 2014

Species of snake

’’Lycodon zoosvictoriae’’, commonly known as Zoos Victoria’s wolf snake, is a species of wolf snake. It was discovered in Cambodia in June 2014.

== Taxonomy ==
Lycodon zoosvictoriae was first formally described in 2014 by Thy Neang, Timo Harmann, Seiha Hun, Nicholas J. Souter and Neil M. Furey with its type locality given as N12°09'22.0", E102°59'18.7", 1,284 m (4,213 ft) above sea level in Phnom Samkos Wildlife Sanctuary in the Cardamom Mountains of Pursat Province in southwest Cambodia. This species is classified in the genus Lycodon, the wolf snakes, in the subfamily Colubrinae of the family Colubridae.

== Etymology ==
Lycodon zoosvictoriae is classified in the genus Lycodon, this name is derived from the Greek words λύκος (lykos) meaning wolf and οδόν (odon) meaning tooth, Both the specific name and the common name refer to "Zoos Victoria", the Zoological Parks and Gardens Board of the southeastern Australian State of Victoria. This organisation funded the Cardamom Mountains Research Group in collaboration with the Cambodian Ministry of Environment and Fauna & Flora International from 2006.

== Description ==
Lycodon zoosvictoriae has a dark brown, pale edged upper surface of the head with pale lines between its scales. The back close to the head has irregularly scattered dark brown blotches and there are 31 regular dark brown saddle-like blotches on rear back and 26 on the tail, all on a light tan background colour. The underside is white with dark patches or spots. The holotype had a snout-to-vent length of 411 mm (16.2 in).

== Distribution and habitat ==
Lycodon zoosvictoriae is found in the Cardamom Mountains of southwestern Cambodia. In 2024 this species was observed and photographed in Khao Khitchakut National Park in Chanthaburi province in Thailand, 120 km (75 mi) northwest of its type locality. Both the type locality and the Thai locality are in submontane forest.

== Biology ==
Lycodon zoosvictoriae is thought to have a similar biology to other wolf snakes, being terrestrial and arboreal, and feeding on lizards and frogs. The two specimens were found at different times of day, the holotype was found at night and the Thai snake was found during the day.
