= Lycodon neomaculatus =

Indochinese Banded Wolfsnake

Scientific classification
- Kingdom: Animalia
- Phylum: Chordata
- Class: Reptilia
- Order: Squamata
- Suborder: Serpentes
- Family: Colubridae
- Genus: Lycodon
- Species: L. neomaculatus

Binomial name
- Lycodon neomaculatus Nguyen, Lee, Pauwels, Kennedy-Gold, Poyarkov, David, Vogel, 2024

Species of snake

Lycodon neomaculatus, the Indochinese banded wolfsnake, is a snake found in Cambodia, Laos, Myanmar, Thailand and Vietnam.

== Description ==
The snake is described as having large nostrils, and white bands along its body.
