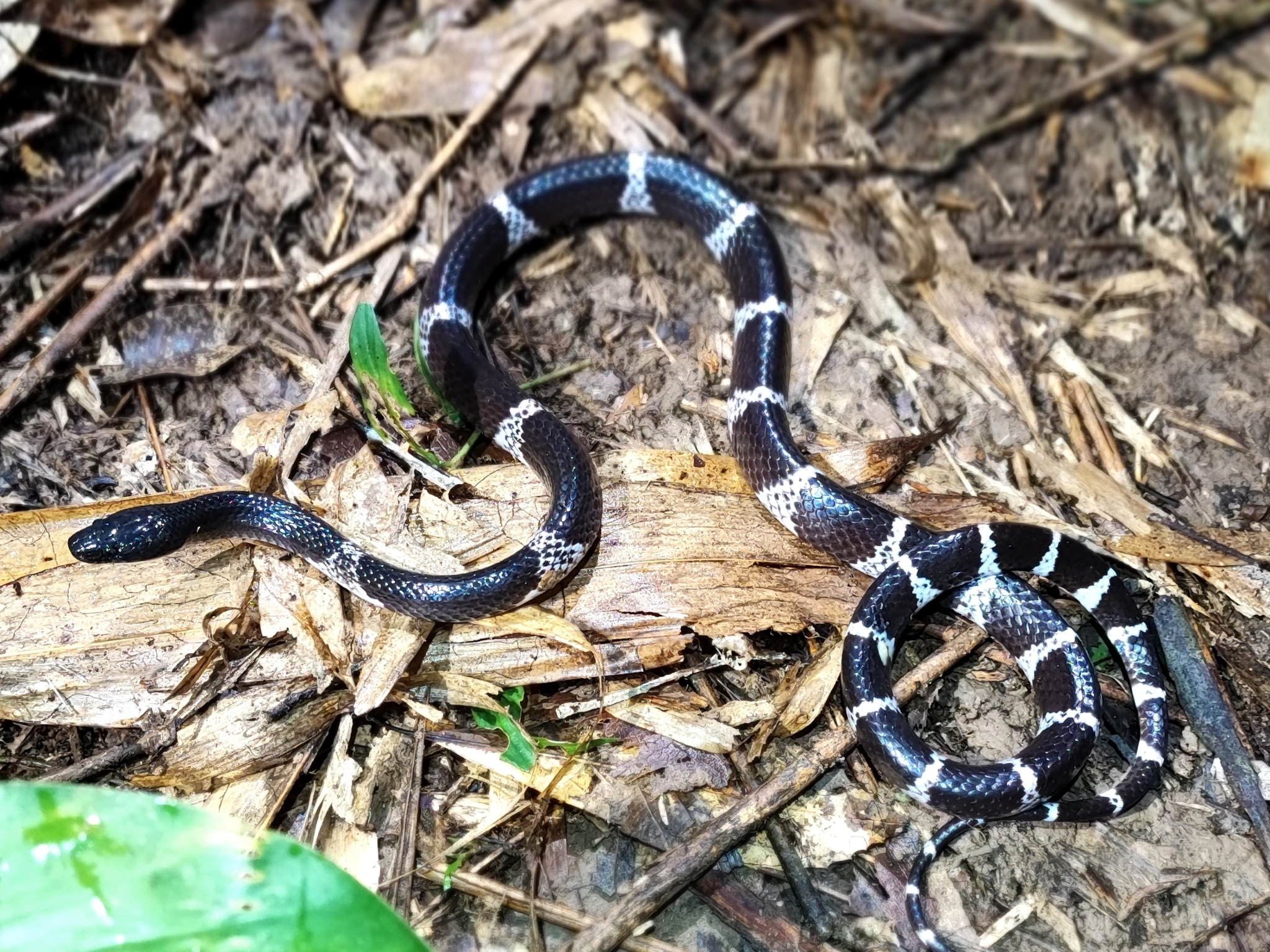
- Truong's wolf snake as spotted in the wild

Scientific classification
- Kingdom: Animalia
- Phylum: Chordata
- Class: Reptilia
- Order: Squamata
- Suborder: Serpentes
- Family: Colubridae
- Genus: Lycodon
- Species: L. truongi

Binomial name
- Lycodon truongi Nguyen, Duong, Wood, & Grismer, 2022

= Lycodon truongi =

Species of snake

Lycodon truongi, Truong's wolf snake, is a species of snake in the family Colubridae.

== Distribution ==
It is found in Vietnam.
