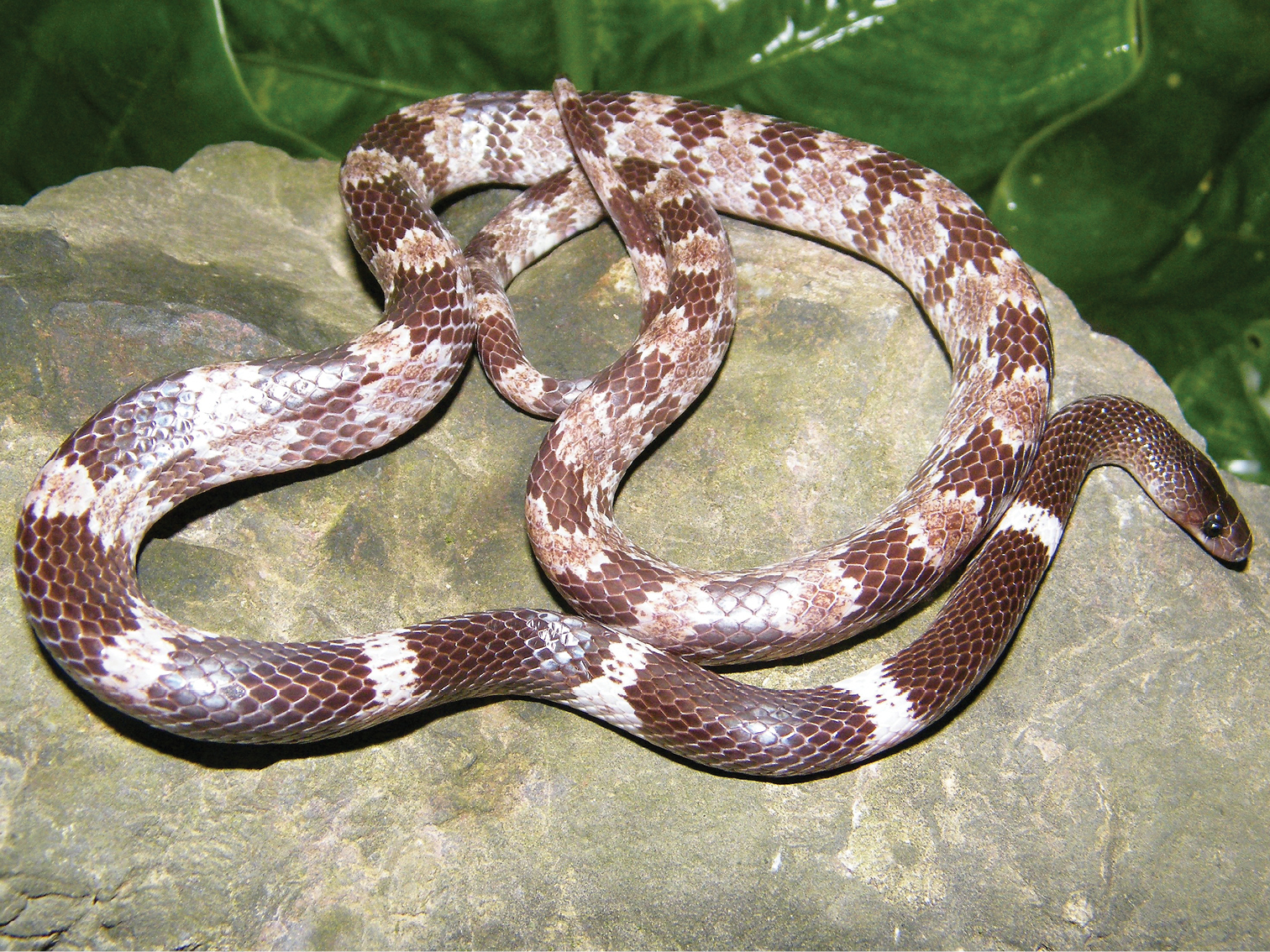

Scientific classification
- Kingdom: Animalia
- Phylum: Chordata
- Class: Reptilia
- Order: Squamata
- Suborder: Serpentes
- Family: Colubridae
- Genus: Lycodon
- Species: L. pictus

Binomial name
- Lycodon pictus Janssen, Pham, Ngo, Le, Nguyen & Ziegler, 2019

= Lycodon pictus =

Species of snake

Lycodon pictus is a species of snake in the family Colubridae.

== Distribution ==
It is found in Vietnam and China.
