= Lycodon banksi =

Scientific classification
- Kingdom: Animalia
- Phylum: Chordata
- Class: Reptilia
- Order: Squamata
- Suborder: Serpentes
- Family: Colubridae
- Genus: Lycodon
- Species: L. banksi

Binomial name
- Lycodon banksi Luu, Bonkowski, Nguyen, Le, Calame, & Ziegler, 2018

Species of lizard

Lycodon banksi, Banks's wolf snake, is a species of snake found in Laos.
