= Scarce bridle snake =

Conservation status
- Data Deficient (IUCN 3.1)

Scientific classification
- Kingdom: Animalia
- Phylum: Chordata
- Class: Reptilia
- Order: Squamata
- Suborder: Serpentes
- Family: Colubridae
- Genus: Lycodon
- Species: L. gracilis

Binomial name
- Lycodon gracilis (Günther, 1864)

Synonyms
- Odontomus gracilis Günther, 1864; Odontomus fergusonii Haly, 1888; Hydrophobus gracilis (Günther, 1864); Dryocalamus gracilis (Günther, 1864)

Species of snake

The scarce bridle snake (Lycodon gracilis) is a species of snake found in South India, Sri Lanka, and Myanmar.

== Description ==
The holotype measures 53 cm (21 in) in length, including the 10 cm (4 in) tail. The holotype has 234 ventral scales, an entire anal scale, and 81–83 subcaudal scales. The ground colour is white. There are about 38 dark-brown crossbands, which are about 2–3 times as wide as the white interspaces. The interspaces are marbled with brown. The first crossband occupies the head. The lower parts are uniform white.

== Distribution ==
This species is known from scattered records, including just two specimens reported since 1888. In India, it is known from Andhra Pradesh, Karnataka, and Orissa. The Sri Lankan record is from Jaffna. Lastly, this species is known from False Island, off the Arakan coast of Myanmar. The holotype was collected from the Anamallay Mountains by Richard Henry Beddome.

== Habitat ==
Lycodon gracilis occurs in moist and dry forests. Its Sri Lankan habitat has been described as "monsoon scrub jungle".

== Threats ==
This species could be threatened by habitat loss and degradation caused by agricultural and urban expansion. However, the impact of these threats is unknown as current records are lacking.
