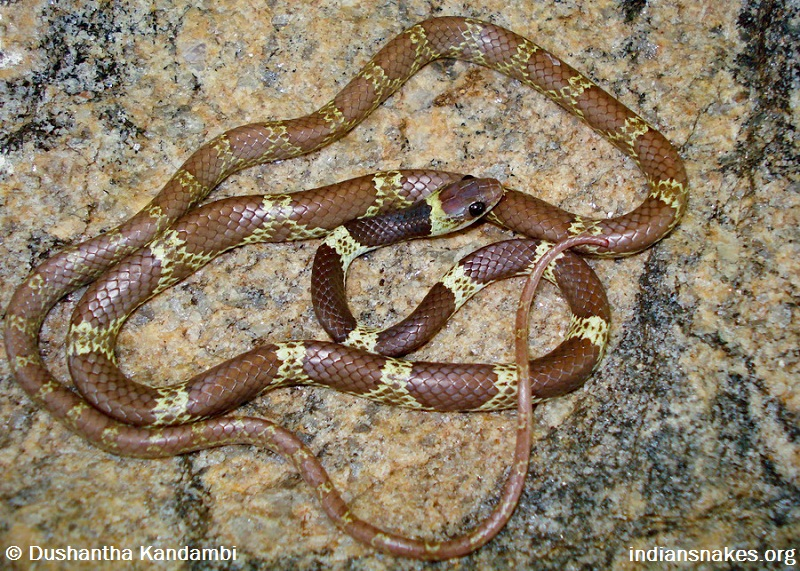

Conservation status
- Least Concern (IUCN 3.1)

Scientific classification
- Kingdom: Animalia
- Phylum: Chordata
- Class: Reptilia
- Order: Squamata
- Suborder: Serpentes
- Family: Colubridae
- Genus: Lycodon
- Species: L. nympha

Binomial name
- Lycodon nympha (Daudin, 1803)

Synonyms
- Dryocalamus nympha

= Vellore bridal snake =

Species of snake

The Vellore bridal snake (Lycodon nympha) is a species of snake found in southern India and Sri Lanka. Bridal snakes are so named because of the characteristic yellow band behind the head, resembling a bridal veil.

Characteristics: A small snake with a glossy black or dark brown colouration. Its colouration may be accompanied by a series of irregular white or grey stripes. Its ventral area is creamy yellow. This snake has considerably large eyes with vertical pupils which are adaptations for its nocturnal lifestyle. It has a rounded snout and an oval shaped flat head.

== Behaviour ==
A nocturnal snake which is very active and timid by nature. If cornered and provoked it will fiercely attack its challenger repeatedly. This snake has a tendency to enter human dwellings in search of prey. It is highly capable of climbing walls but has an equal tendency to fall off, often onto unsuspecting human occupants with catastrophic results. Feeds mainly on lizards but may consume frogs and other small fauna when the opportunity provides so. Very little known due to the paucity of specimens. It is assumed to be oviparous. Little known about its growth rate. The longest specimens seldom exceed 50 cm.

Non venomous

== Identification ==
This snake has 13 rows of costals throughout its body and elongated Loreal shields that touch the eyes. Rostral: Touches six shields. Frontal: Relatively small. Supraoculars: Broad and prominent, each shield is nearly as big as the Frontal.
Parietals: Prominent and each shield is twice as bit as the Frontal.
Prefrontals: The combined system is nearly as large as the Frontal.
Nasals: Entire with the nostril situated at the centre. (Rarely may be divided)
Internasals: Span the entire length of the anterior edge of the Prefrontals.
Loreals: Elongated and touch the eyes.
Preoculars: Absent
Postoculars: Divided into two shields.
Temporals: Small and divided into two shields.
Supralabials: Seven pairs (Rarely six or eight) of which the third and fourth pairs touch the eyes.
Mental: Stereotype in form.
Infralabials: Five pairs of which the fifth is the largest.
Sublinguals: Anterior pair larger than the Posterior pair.
Costals: Fall into 13 rows that run throughout the entire length of the body.
Ventrals: 200 to 243
Anal Shield: Divided
Subcaudals: 65 to 88, divided

Dentition: Maxillary: 9 to 10 Palatine: 8 to 9 Pterygoid: 20 to 21 Mandibular: 19 to 21 Distribution: Southern India and Sri Lanka

The range of this snake appears to extend from Jaffna in the north to Anuradhapura, and includes Trincomalee. This snake is rare throughout its range and has not been recorded in the central hills.
