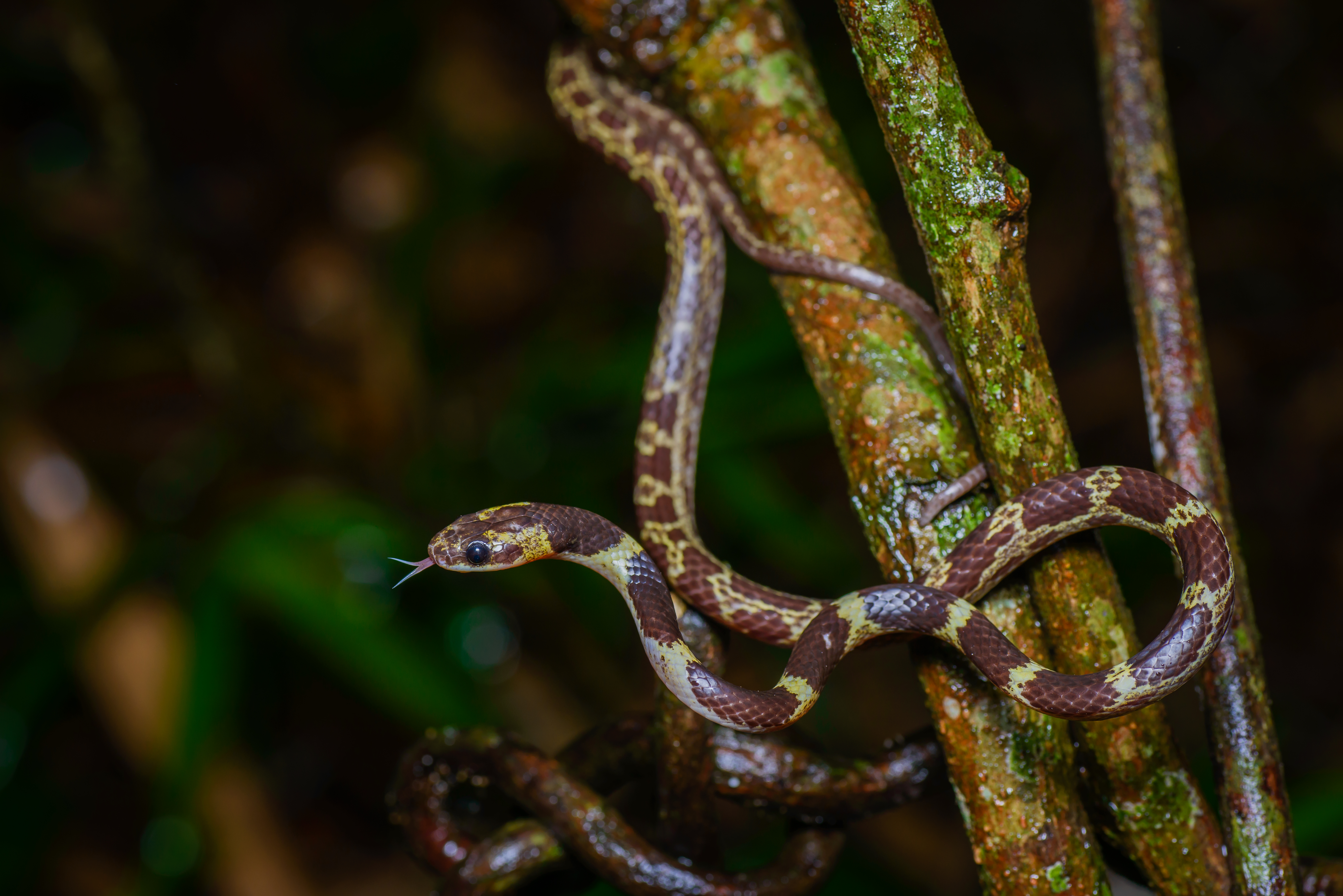

Conservation status
- Least Concern (IUCN 3.1)

Scientific classification
- Kingdom: Animalia
- Phylum: Chordata
- Class: Reptilia
- Order: Squamata
- Suborder: Serpentes
- Family: Colubridae
- Genus: Lycodon
- Species: L. subannulatus

Binomial name
- Lycodon subannulatus (A.M.C. Duméril, Bibron, & A.H.A. Duméril, 1854)

= Lycodon subannulatus =

Species of snake

Lycodon subannulatus, the Malayan bridal snake or southern bridle snake, is a species of snake in the family Colubridae.

== Distribution ==
It is found in Indonesia, Malaysia, Brunei, Singapore, Thailand, Myanmar, and the Philippines.
