= Lycodon carinatus =

Sri Lankan Wolf Snake

Conservation status
- Endangered (IUCN 3.1)

Scientific classification
- Kingdom: Animalia
- Phylum: Chordata
- Class: Reptilia
- Order: Squamata
- Suborder: Serpentes
- Family: Colubridae
- Genus: Lycodon
- Species: L. carinatus

Binomial name
- Lycodon carinatus Kuhl,1820

Species of snake

Lycodon carianatus is a snake of the Colubridae family. It is endemic to the island of Sri Lanka. The snake is commonly known as the Ceylon wolf snake, and as දාර කරවලා (Daara Karawala) or දාර රදනකයා (daara radanakayaa) in Sinhala.

== Description ==
Dorsal side black with 19 distinct white rings. These may be reduced or completely absent in adults. Black bands extend to venter, but are fairly diffuse. Scales are keeled and dull in appearance. Midbody scale rows 17-19. Ventrals 180-202. Subcaudals entire 42-64.

== Ecology ==
Nocturnal and terrestrial, hiding under rubble in forests during the day. Diet comprises frogs, geckos, skinks and small non-venomous snakes.

== Reproduction ==
Lycodon carinatus is oviparous, laying 4 to 7 eggs at a time.

== Taxonomy Updates ==
This species has been shifted to the genus Lycodon in 2013 (PYRON et al. 2013) from previously known genus Cercaspis
