= Lycodon rosozonatus =

Conservation status
- Data Deficient (IUCN 3.1)

Scientific classification
- Kingdom: Animalia
- Phylum: Chordata
- Class: Reptilia
- Order: Squamata
- Suborder: Serpentes
- Family: Colubridae
- Genus: Lycodon
- Species: L. rosozonatus

Binomial name
- Lycodon rosozonatus (Hu & Zhao, 1972))

Species of snake

Lycodon rosozonatus , the rose big-tooth snake or pink large-toothed snake, is a species of snake in the family Colubridae.

== Distribution ==
It is found in China, Vietnam, and Russia.
