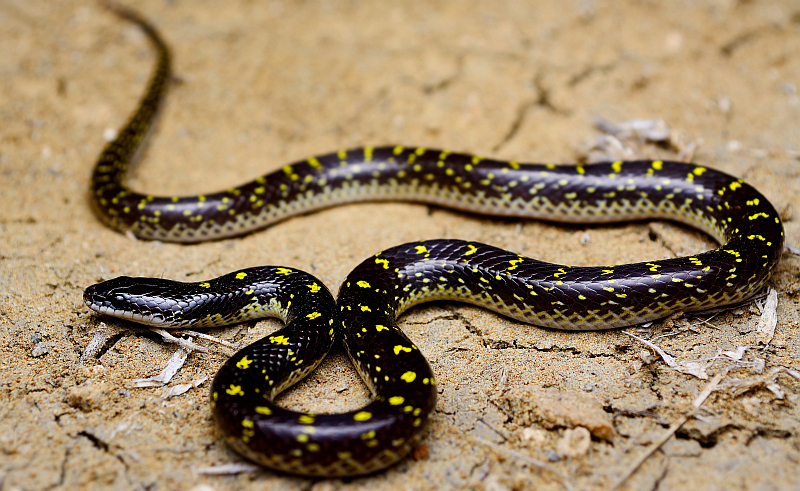
- Lycodon flavomaculatus at Amravati, Maharashtra

Conservation status
- Least Concern (IUCN 3.1)

Scientific classification
- Kingdom: Animalia
- Phylum: Chordata
- Class: Reptilia
- Order: Squamata
- Suborder: Serpentes
- Family: Colubridae
- Genus: Lycodon
- Species: L. flavomaculatus

Binomial name
- Lycodon flavomaculatus Wall, 1907

Synonyms
- Lycodon flavomaculatus Wall, 1907; Ophites flavomaculatus – Wall, 1923; Lycodon flavomaculatus – M.A. Smith, 1943

= Lycodon flavomaculatus =

Species of snake

Lycodon flavomaculatus, commonly called the yellow-spotted wolf snake, is a species of colubrid snake found in the Western Ghats of India.

== Description ==
Dorsally Lycodon flavimaculatus is shiny black with a series of yellow vertebral spots. Beside each spot whitish crossbars descend the flanks, beginning about the same width as the spots then widening. The spots are about 2 scales long, separated by intervals of 4 or 5 scales. The dorsal surface of the head is black, and the lips are white. The entire venter of the snake is white.

At first glance, it resembles Lampropeltis getula, the Eastern kingsnake of the United States.

The yellow-spotted wolf snake is a small snake. Adults are about 35 cm (13¾ inches) in length.

Dorsal scales in 17 rows on neck and at midbody, in 15 rows posteriorly. Ventrals 165–182, not angulate; anal plate divided; subcaudals 53–62, divided.

Head slightly distinct from neck. Snout rounded and somewhat flattened. Nine upper labials, of which only the first contacts the nasal.
