= Lycodon multifasciatus =

Conservation status
- Least Concern (IUCN 3.1)

Scientific classification
- Kingdom: Animalia
- Phylum: Chordata
- Class: Reptilia
- Order: Squamata
- Suborder: Serpentes
- Family: Colubridae
- Genus: Lycodon
- Species: L. multifasciatus

Binomial name
- Lycodon multifasciatus (Maki, 1931)

Species of snake

Lycodon multifasciatus is a species of snake in the family Colubridae.

== Distribution ==
It is found in Japan.
