= Lycodon flavozonatus =

Conservation status
- Least Concern (IUCN 3.1)

Scientific classification
- Kingdom: Animalia
- Phylum: Chordata
- Class: Reptilia
- Order: Squamata
- Suborder: Serpentes
- Family: Colubridae
- Genus: Lycodon
- Species: L. flavozonatus

Binomial name
- Lycodon flavozonatus (Pope, 1928)

Species of snake

The yellow-banded big tooth snake, yellow-spotted wolf snake, yellow large-toothed snake, or big-tooth snake (Lycodon flavozonatus), is a species of snake in the family colubridae. It is found in Myanmar, Vietnam, and China.
