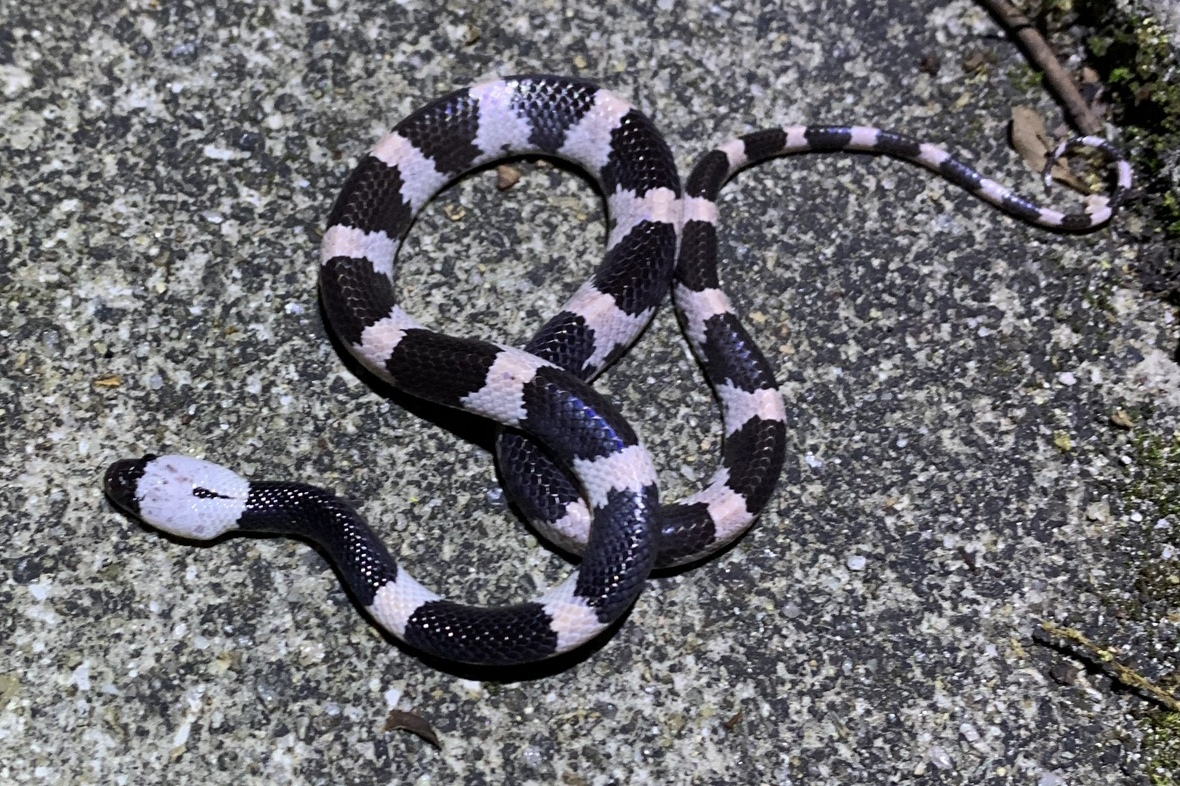

Conservation status
- Least Concern (IUCN 3.1)

Scientific classification
- Kingdom: Animalia
- Phylum: Chordata
- Class: Reptilia
- Order: Squamata
- Suborder: Serpentes
- Family: Colubridae
- Genus: Lycodon
- Species: L. futsingensis

Binomial name
- Lycodon futsingensis (Pope, 1928)

= Lycodon futsingensis =

Species of snake

Lycodon futsingensis is a species of snake in the family colubridae. It is found in Laos, Vietnam, and China.

Lycodon futsingensis was included in the "List of Terrestrial Wildlife with Important Ecological, Scientific, and Social Value" in 2023.

== Morphological characteristics ==
The Fuqing white ring snake is similar to the black backed white ring snake (Lycodon ruhstati), but the black backed white ring snake has more abdominal scales and lower tail scales. Blunt snout, flat and nearly trapezoidal head. The adult's head and back are black, and the upper lip scales are black with varying degrees of scattered white spots; The trunk and tail are mainly black or dark black brown in color, with 24-29 white rings and 10-15 white rings with scattered black spots on the trunk and tail, respectively. The white rings are irregular, with 1-6 dorsal scales wide, thinner at the spine and widest at the abdomen. The front abdomen of the head and torso is mainly white, with black spots mixed in; The posterior abdominal surface is mostly black brown.
