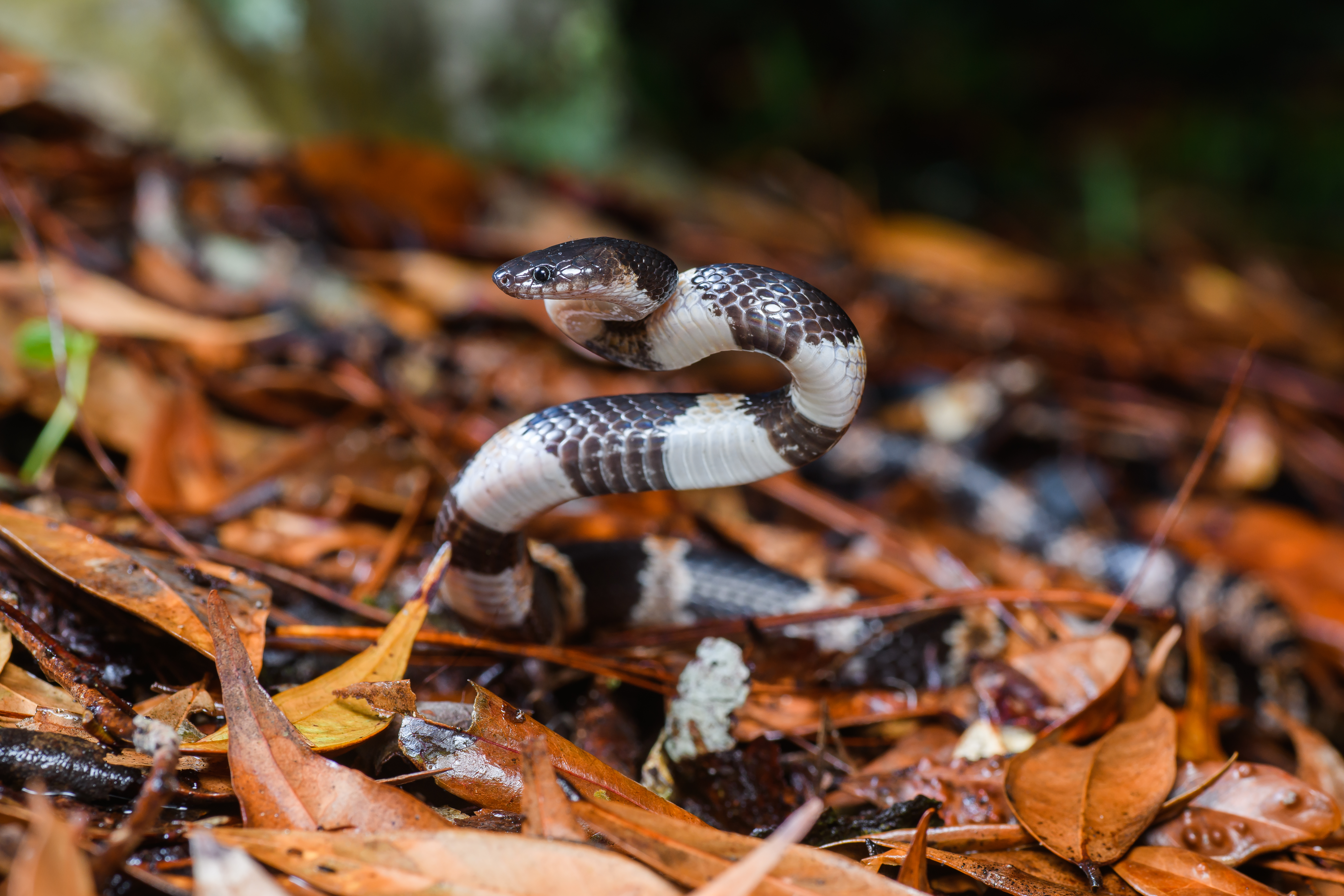
- Lycodon fasciatus, Banded wolf snake - Phu Kradueng National Park

Conservation status
- Least Concern (IUCN 3.1)

Scientific classification
- Kingdom: Animalia
- Phylum: Chordata
- Class: Reptilia
- Order: Squamata
- Suborder: Serpentes
- Family: Colubridae
- Genus: Lycodon
- Species: L. fasciatus

Binomial name
- Lycodon fasciatus (Anderson, 1879)

Synonyms
- Ophites fasciatus Anderson, 1879; Lycodon fasciatus - Boulenger, 1890; Dinodon yunnanensis Werner, 1922; Lycodon fasciatus - M.A. Smith, 1943

= Lycodon fasciatus =

Species of snake

Lycodon fasciatus, commonly known as the banded wolf snake, is a species of colubrid snake.

== Distribution ==
It is found in India (Assam), Bangladesh, Myanmar, Thailand, Laos, Vietnam, Tibet, SW China (from Yunnan and Guangxi to Hubei, northward to Shaanxi and Gansu, Fujian, Sichuan).

== Description ==
Adults may attain 53 cm (21 inches) in total length, with a tail 11 cm (4¼ inches) long.

Its color pattern consists of broad purplish-black rings which encircle its body and are separated by yellowish or reddish intervals. The first black ring does not encircle the neck.

The dorsal scales are in 17 rows, weakly keeled anteriorly, the keels becoming more pronounced posteriorly. The ventrals are 205–213; the anal is entire; and the divided subcaudals are 77–90.

== Photos ==
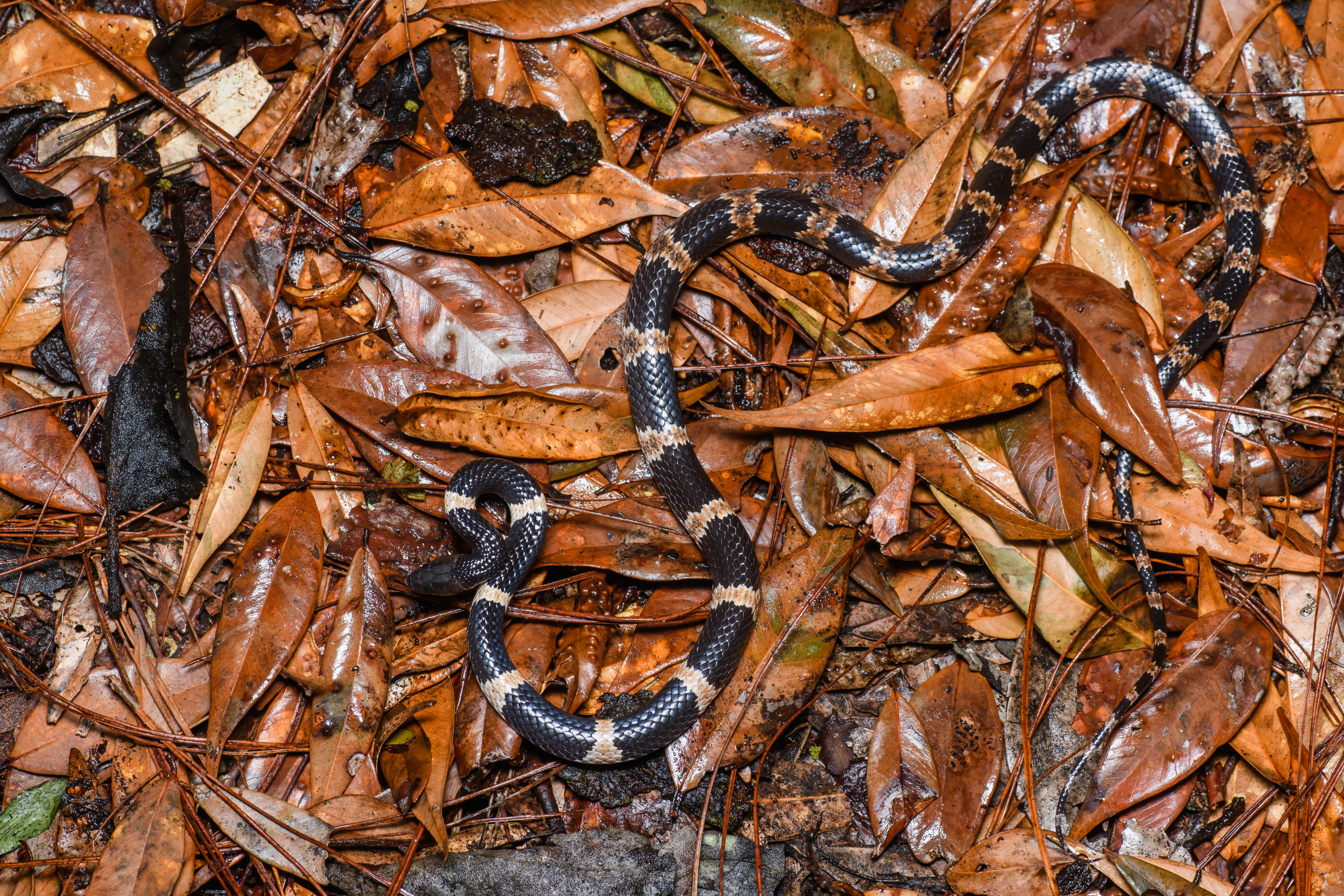
Lycodon fasciatus, Banded wolf snake - Phu Kradueng National Park
