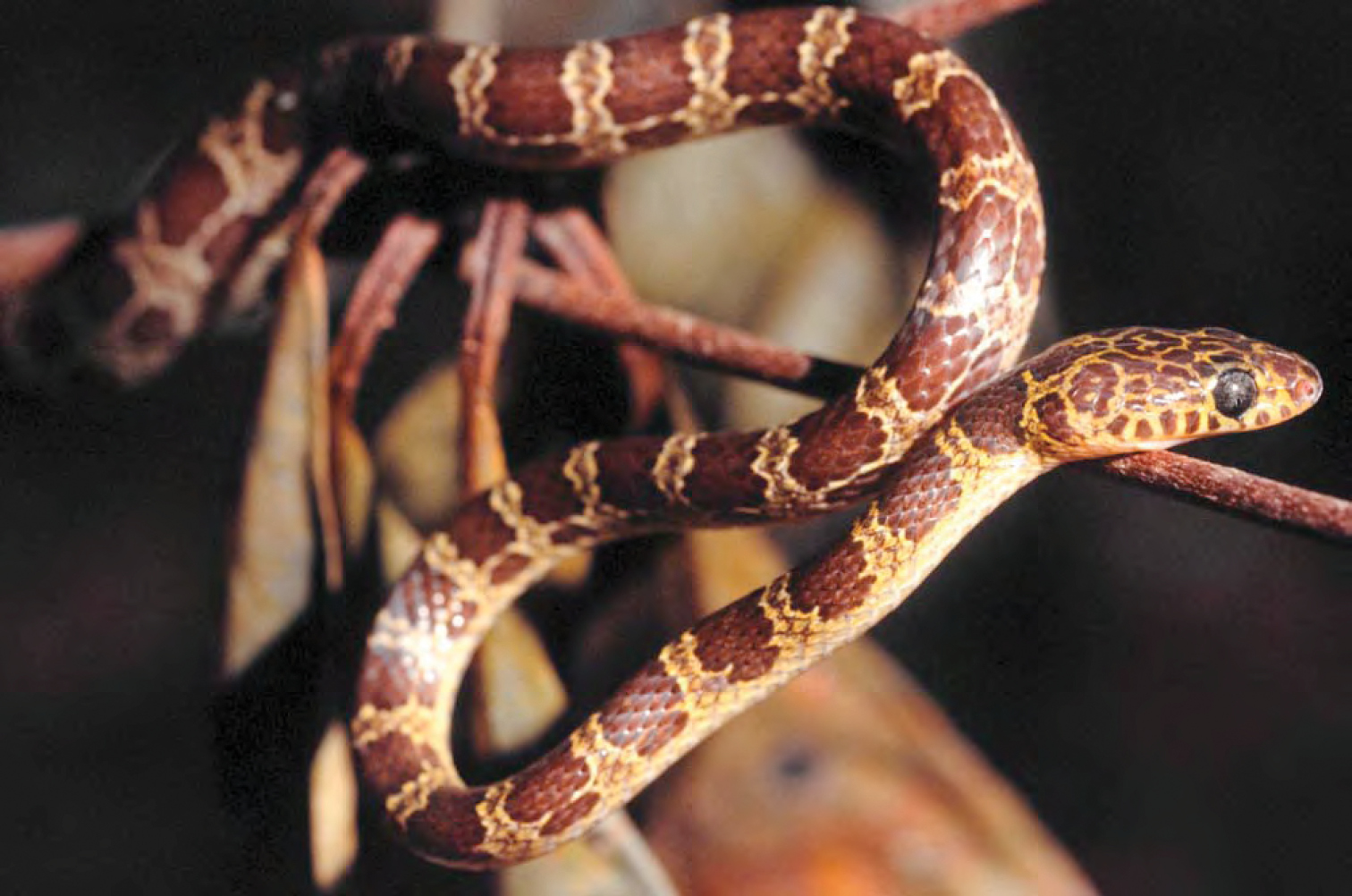

Conservation status
- Least Concern (IUCN 3.1)

Scientific classification
- Kingdom: Animalia
- Phylum: Chordata
- Class: Reptilia
- Order: Squamata
- Suborder: Serpentes
- Family: Colubridae
- Genus: Lycodon
- Species: L. muelleri

Binomial name
- Lycodon muelleri A.M.C. Duméril, Bibron & A.H.A. Duméril, 1854

Synonyms
- Odontomus muelleri (A.M.C. Duméril, Bibron & A.H.A. Duméril, 1854); Haplonodon philippinensis Griffin, 1910

= Lycodon muelleri =

Species of snake

Lycodon muelleri, also known commonly Müller's wolf snake, Muller's wolf snake, and the Java wolf snake, is a species of snake in the subfamily Colubrinae of the family Colubridae. The species is endemic to the Philippines.

== Etymology ==
The specific name, muelleri, is in honor of German naturalist Salomon Müller.

== Description ==
Lycodon muelleri may attain a total length of about 80 cm (31 in), which includes a tail length of about 20 cm (7.9 in). The dorsal scales are smooth, without apical pits, and arranged in 17 rows. The ventrals number 196–203. The anal plate is entire (undivided). The subcaudals are paired (divided).

== Dentition ==
Lycodon muelleri has the following dentition. The teeth on the maxilla increase in size from the first tooth to the eighth tooth, the last three or four of which are sturdy and fang-like. After a short interspace, there are three small teeth. These are followed by three large teeth which are fang-link and laterally compressed.

== Habitat ==
The preferred natural habitat of Lycodon muelleri is forest, at elevations from sea level to 1,235 m (4,052 ft), but it has also been found in agricultural areas.

== Reproduction ==
Lycodon muelleri is oviparous.
