= Gernot Vogel =

German herpetologist (born 1963)

- Born: June 14, 1963 (age 63); Heidelberg, Germany
- Education: Heidelberg University
- Known for: Taxonomy and systematics of Asian snakes
- Scientific career
- Fields: Herpetology, Chemistry
- Workplaces: Rifcon GmbH

Gernot Vogel (born 14 June 1963) is a German herpetologist.

As of 2014 he was a self-funded freelance herpetologist and chemist not tied to an institution. As of 2021 he is a member of the Society for Southeast Asian Herpetology in Germany.

== Biography ==
Vogel holds a doctorate in chemistry from Heidelberg University. Since 2007, he has worked at the Heidelberg-based company Rifcon GmbH in quality assurance, focusing on the chemical and physical evaluation of pesticides and their effects on reptiles.

His career as a herpetologist was inspired by a meeting with Konrad Klemmer of the Naturmuseum Senckenberg. Since 1985, he has worked as a freelance herpetologist in Asia. His first article, on the bronze back snakes (Dendrelaphis) of Thailand, appeared in herpetofauna in April 1990. During his fieldwork, Vogel has traveled to China, India, Malaysia, Sumatra, Thailand, Vietnam, Laos, the Philippines, France, Yugoslavia, Turkey, Greece and Tunisia.

Vogel collaborates frequently with international herpetologists, including the French researcher Patrick David on the genera Xenochrophis, Oligodon, Trimeresurus, Tropidolaemus, Amphiesma, Macrocalamus and Boiga, as well as with Dutch herpetologist Johan van Rooijen on the descriptions of ten new species of Dendrelaphis and the revalidation of several older names.

He is co-author of the books The Amphibians and Reptiles of Mount Kinabalu (North Borneo) (with Rudolf Malkmus, Ulrich Manthey, Peter Hoffmann and Joachim Kosuch), The Snakes of Sumatra (with Patrick David) and The Snakes of Sulawesi (with Ruud de Lang). He is also editor of the Terralog series on venomous snakes.

== Species described ==
Vogel has been involved in the descriptions of the following genera and species. With the exception of the gecko Dixonius hangseesom, all are snakes:

- Trimeresurus venustus (Vogel, 1991)
- Macrocalamus schulzi (Vogel & David, 1999)
- Trimeresurus gumprechti (David, Vogel, Pauwels & Vidal, 2002)
- Dixonius hangseesom (Bauer, Sumontha, Grossmann, Pauwels & Vogel, 2004)
- Trimeresurus nebularis (Vogel, David & Pauwels, 2004)
- Craspedocephalus andalasensis (David, Vogel, Vijayakumar & Vidal, 2006)
- Dendrelaphis kopsteini (Vogel & van Rooijen, 2007)
- Hebius leucomystax (David, Bain, Quang Truong, Orlov, Vogel, Ngoc Thanh & Ziegler, 2007)
- Dendrelaphis haasi (van Rooijen & Vogel, 2008)
- Dendrelaphis underwoodi (van Rooijen & Vogel, 2008)
- Dendrelaphis marenae (Vogel & van Rooijen, 2008)
- Dendrelaphis grismeri (Vogel & van Rooijen, 2008)
- Oligodon saintgironsi (David, Vogel & Pauwels, 2008)
- Oligodon pseudotaeniatus (David, Vogel & van Rooijen, 2008)
- Oligodon deuvei (David, Vogel & van Rooijen, 2008)
- Oligodon moricei (David, Vogel & van Rooijen, 2008)
- Lycodon ophiophagus (Vogel, David, Pauwels, Sumontha, Norval, Hendrix, Vu & Ziegler, 2010)
- Hebius arquus (David & Vogel, 2010)
- Lycodon synaptor (Vogel & David, 2010)
- Dendrelaphis ashoki (Vogel & van Rooijen, 2011)
- Lycodon gongshan (Vogel & Luo, 2011)
- Dendrelaphis walli (Vogel & van Rooijen, 2011)
- Lycodon liuchengchaoi (Zhang, Jiang, Vogel & Rao, 2011)
- Dendrelaphis girii (Vogel & van Rooijen, 2011)
- Oligodon wagneri (David & Vogel, 2012)
- Dendrelaphis levitoni (van Rooijen & Vogel, 2012)
- Dendrelaphis nigroserratus (Vogel, van Rooijen & Hauser, 2012)
- Lycodon davidi (Vogel, Nguyen, Kingsada & Ziegler, 2012)
- Boiga flaviviridis (Vogel & Ganesh, 2013)
- Protobothrops himalayanus (Pan, Chettri, Yang, Jiang, Wang, Zhang & Vogel, 2013)
- Opisthotropis durandi (Tenié, Lottier, David, Nguyen & Vogel, 2014)
- Trimeresurus gunaleni (Vogel, David & Sidik, 2014)
- Pareas vindumi (Vogel, 2015)
- Isanophis (David, Pauwels, Nguyen & Vogel, 2015)
- Rabdion grovesi (Amarasinghe, Vogel, McGuire, Sidik, Supriatna & Ineich, 2015)
- Blythia hmuifang (Vogel, Lalremsanga & Vanlalhrima, 2017)
- Lycodon gibsonae (Vogel & David, 2019)
- Liopeltis pallidonuchalis (Poyarkov, Nguyen & Vogel, 2019)
- Calamaria strigiventris (Poyarkov, Nguyen, Orlov & Vogel, 2019)
- Trimeresurus caudornatus (Chen, Ding, Vogel & Shi, 2020)
- Dendrelaphis wickrorum (Danushka, Kanishka, Amarasinghe, Vogel & Seneviratne, 2020)
- Smithophis linearis (Vogel, Chen, Deepak, Gower, Shi, Ding & Hou, 2020)
- Lycodon deccanensis (Ganesh, Deuti, Punith, Achyuthan, Mallik, Adhikari & Vogel, 2020)
- Trimeresurus davidi (Chandramouli, Campbell & Vogel, 2020)
- Pareas geminatus (Ding, Chen, Suwannapoom, Nguyen, Poyarkov & Vogel, 2020)
- Lycodon serratus (Wang, Yu, Vogel & Che, 2020)
- Lycodon obvelatus (Wang, Yu, Vogel & Che, 2020)
- Hebius igneus (David, Vogel, Nguyen, Orlov, Pauwels, Teynié & Ziegler, 2021)
- Pareas victorianus (Vogel, Nguyen & Poyarkov, 2021)
- Bungarus suzhenae (Chen, Shi, Vogel, Ding & Shi, 2021)
- Oligodon tolaki (Amarasinghe, Henkanaththegedara, Campbell, Riyanto, Hallermann & Vogel, 2021)
- Trimeresurus guoi (Chen, Shi, Vogel & Ding, 2021)
- Rhabdophis confusus (David & Vogel, 2021)
- Pareas abros (Poyarkov, Nguyen, Pawangkhanant, Yushchenko, Brakels, Nguyen, Nguyen, Suwannapoom, Orlov & Vogel, 2022)
- Oligodon tillacki (Bandara, Ganesh, Kanishka, Danushka, Sharma, Campbell, Ineich, Vogel & Amarasinghe, 2022)
- Oligodon teyniei (David, Hauser & Vogel, 2022)
- Herpetoreas murlen (Lalremsanga, Bal, Vogel & Biakzuala, 2022)
- Trimeresurus calamitas (Vogel, David & Sidik, 2022)
- Trimeresurus kirscheyi (Vogel, David & Sidik, 2022)
- Trimeresurus whitteni (Vogel, David & Sidik, 2022)
- Naja fuxi (Shi, Vogel, Chen & Ding, 2022)
- Pareas tigerinus (Liu, Zhang, Poyarkov, Hou, Wu, Rao, Nguyen & Vogel, 2023)
- Trimeresurus uetzi (Vogel, Nguyen & David, 2023)
- Trimeresurus cyanolabris (Idiiatullina, Nguyen, Bragin, Pawangkhanant, Le, Vogel, David & Poyarkov, 2024)

== Eponyms ==
Several species have been named in his honor:

- Trimeresurus vogeli (2001)
- Macrocalamus vogeli (2005)
- Dendrelaphis vogeli (2020)
