= Oligodon pseudotaeniatus =

Conservation status
- Least Concern (IUCN 3.1)

Scientific classification
- Kingdom: Animalia
- Phylum: Chordata
- Class: Reptilia
- Order: Squamata
- Suborder: Serpentes
- Family: Colubridae
- Genus: Oligodon
- Species: O. pseudotaeniatus

Binomial name
- Oligodon pseudotaeniatus David, Vogel & van Rooijen, 2008

Species of snake

Oligodon pseudotaeniatus, commonly known as the false striped kukri snake, is a species of colubrid snake. It is endemic to Thailand and known from the Nakhon Ratchasima Province, Saraburi Province, and Bangkok. The type series was collected by Malcolm Arthur Smith. The specific name pseudotaeniatus refers to its similarity to Oligodon taeniatus, with whom it was confused prior to its species description in 2008.

== Description ==
Oligodon pseudotaeniatus are small snakes. Three males in the type series measured 236–254 mm (9.3–10.0 in) in snout–vent length (SVL) and had 61–66 mm (2.4–2.6 in) long tail. The only female had 222 and 36 mm (8.7 and 1.4 in) SVL and tail length, respectively.

This species is morphologically similar to Oligodon taeniatus, differing from the latter by the combination of 17 dorsal scale rows at its midbody, eight supralabials, the absence of dorsal and tail blotches, and the presence of a single vertebral black stripe but no dorsolateral stripes.

== Habitat and conservation ==
This terrestrial and diurnal species occurs in deciduous dipterocarp forests and agricultural land (e.g., cassava plots).

There seem not to be major threats to this species as it tolerates human-modified habitats; however, it has probably been extirpated from Bangkok. It is presumed to be safe in parts of its range that include the Sakaerat Biosphere Reserve on the western edge of the Khorat Plateau.
