= Stream snake =

There are two genera of snake named stream snake:

- Isanophis, a monotypic genus with its sole representative, Boonsong's stream snake, Isanophis boonsongi
- Opisthotropis
