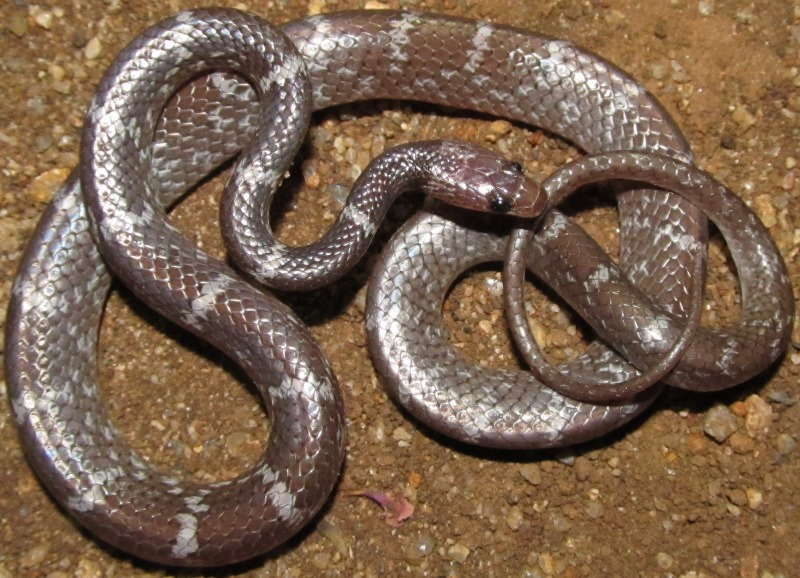

Scientific classification
- Kingdom: Animalia
- Phylum: Chordata
- Class: Reptilia
- Order: Squamata
- Suborder: Serpentes
- Family: Colubridae
- Genus: Lycodon
- Species: L. deccanensis

Binomial name
- Lycodon deccanensis Ganesh, Deuti, Punith, Achyuthan, Mallik, Adhikari, Vogel, 2020

= Lycodon deccanensis =

Species of snake

Lycodon deccanensis, the Deccan wolf snake, is a species of nocturnal, non-venomous colubrid snake species endemic to southern India. It was previously mistaken for another related species, Lycodon travancoricus, but later taxonomic studies revealed its distinctiveness.

== Morphology ==
This is a rather small and slender Lycodon with large bulgy eyes. The back is coffee brown in adults, but black in juveniles, with a series of white cross bar-like patterns on the back and sides of the body, giving a white-mottled appearance.

== Etymology ==
The snake is named after the Deccan plateau in India.

== Distribution ==
This species was described from Devarayana Durga, a hill fort near Bangalore. Other specimens were discovered from nearby hilly areas such as the Horsley Hills and Tirumalai in Chittoor district, Andhra Pradesh as well as Melagiri or Hogenekkal Hills in Krishnakgiri-Dharmapuri districts and Anaikatti Hills, Coimbatore district, Tamil Nadu.

The snake inhabits hilly tracts (600–1100 m asl) covered with mixed deciduous forest vegetation.

== Natural history ==
This is a poorly-known species and its biology remains largely unknown. A nocturnal snake. Young ones were seen ascending tree trunks and building walls up to 1.5 m height, while adults were encountered on ground and as dead ones hit by vehicle while crossing roads. It is presumed to be egg-laying.
