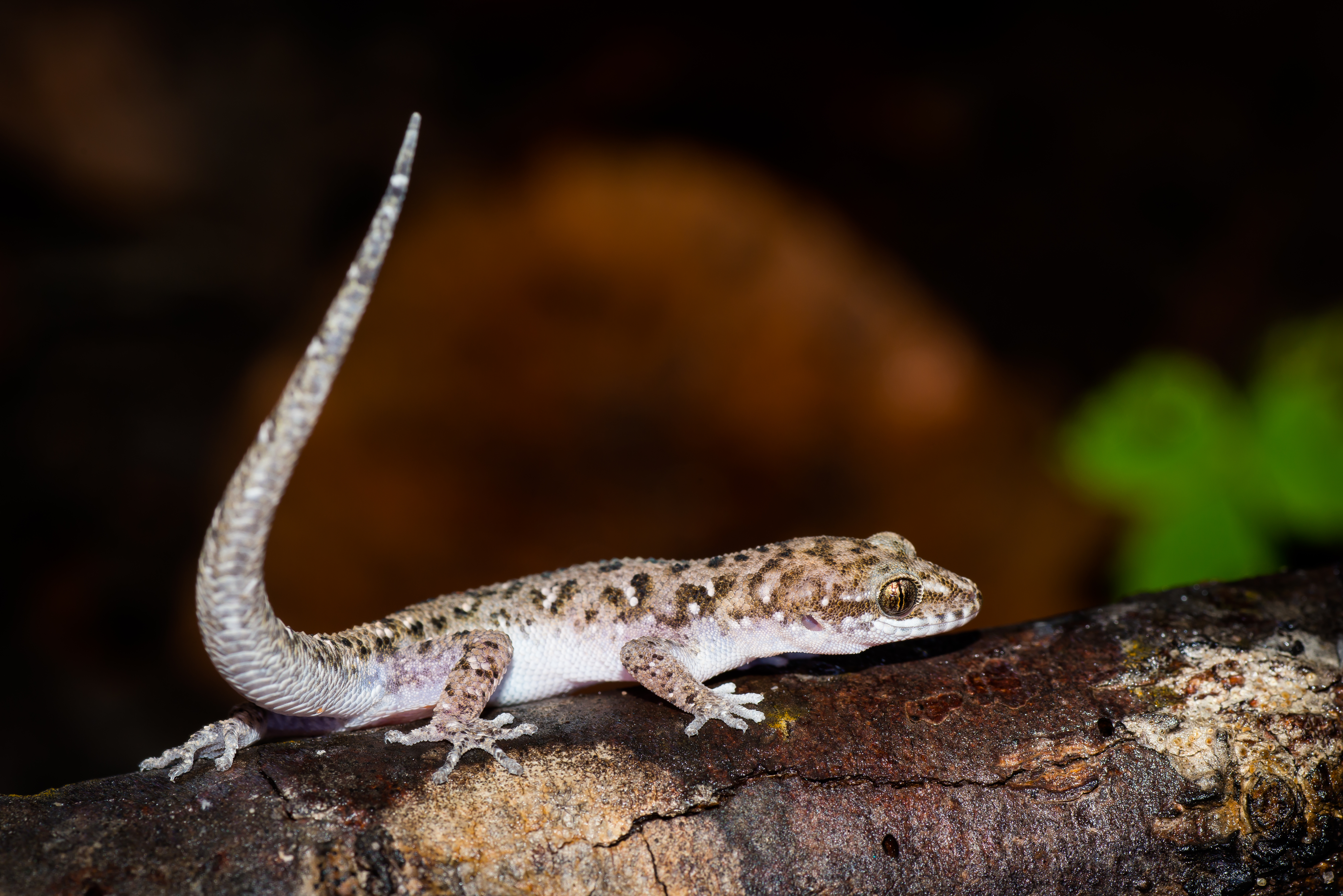

Scientific classification
- Kingdom: Animalia
- Phylum: Chordata
- Class: Reptilia
- Order: Squamata
- Suborder: Gekkota
- Family: Gekkonidae
- Genus: Dixonius
- Species: D. siamensis

Binomial name
- Dixonius siamensis (Boulenger, 1899)

Synonyms
- Phyllodactylus siamensis; Phyllodactylus paviei; Phyllodactylus burmanicus

= Siamese leaf-toed gecko =

Species of lizard

The Siamese leaf-toed gecko (Dixonius siamensis) is a species of gecko found in South Asia and Mainland Southeast Asia. This is the type species of the genus Dixonius, named after James R. Dixon from Texas A&M University.

== Distribution ==
Bangladesh, India, Thailand, Annam, Siam (Dung-Phya-Fai), Myanmar, Vietnam, Laos, Cambodia? Type locality: Dung-Phya Fai Mountains, eastern Siam.
