= Dixonius somchanhae =

Scientific classification
- Kingdom: Animalia
- Phylum: Chordata
- Class: Reptilia
- Order: Squamata
- Suborder: Gekkota
- Family: Gekkonidae
- Genus: Dixonius
- Species: D. somchanhae

Binomial name
- Dixonius somchanhae T.H. Nguyen, Luu, Sitthivong, H.T. Ngo, T.Q. Nguyen, M.D. Le & Ziegler, 2021

Species of lizard

Dixonius somchanhae is a species of lizard in the family Gekkonidae. The species is endemic to Laos.

== Etymology ==
The specific name, somchanhae, is in honor of Laotian botanist Somchanh Bounphanmy for her support of biodiversity research in Laos.

== Reproduction ==
The mode of reproduction of D. somchanhae is unknown.
