= Boonsong Lekagul =

Boonsong Lekagul (15 December 1907 – 9 February 1992) was a Thai medical doctor, biologist, ornithologist, herpetologist, and conservationist.

He was born at Songkhla in southern Thailand and received a medical degree from Chulalongkorn University in Bangkok in 1933. In 1935 he established Thailand's first polyclinic in Bangkok. At first a keen hunter, he became a strong conservationist as he saw Thailand's forests and wildlife becoming fragmented and destroyed. In 1952 he founded the Association for the Conservation of Wildlife. In the mid-1950s, he and the ACW lobbied for a bird sanctuary on the banks of the Chao Phraya River to protect the only known nesting site in Thailand of the openbill stork. In 1962 he founded the Bangkok Bird Club (the Bird Conservation Society of Thailand since 1993) and worked actively with the International Council for Bird Preservation and the World Wildlife Fund.

== Eponymous species ==
Several species and subspecies are named after Boonsong Lekagul in honour of his work as naturalist and conservationist:

- Boonsong's roundleaf bat, Hipposideros lekaguli Thonglongya & Hill, 1974
- Boonsong's variable squirrel, Callosciurus finlaysonii boonsongi Moore and Tate, 1965
- Hill blue flycatcher, Cyornis whitei lekhakuni
- Grey-eyed bulbul, Iole propinqua lekhakuni
- Boonsong's stream snake, Opisthotropis boonsongi Taylor & Elbel, 1958 – a snake endemic to Thailand, in the family Colubridae
- Tuk-kai Boonsong, Cyrtodactylus lekaguli Grismer et al., 2012 – a species of bent-toed gecko endemic to Thailand
- Lekagul's horned frog, Xenophrys (Megophrys) lekaguli (Stuart, Chuaynkern, Chan-ard & Inger, 2006) – a megophryid frog from Eastern Thailand.

== Awards ==
- Honorary member of the World Wide Fund for Nature, 1971
- Commander (Third Class) of the Most Exalted Order of the White Elephant, 1974
- Corresponding Fellow of the American Ornithologists Union, 1974
- Honorary doctorate in Forestry, Kasetsart University, 1976
- Honorary member of the International Union for the Conservation of Nature and Natural Resources, 1978
- J. Paul Getty Wildlife Conservation Prize from the World Wildlife Fund US, 1979
- Honorary doctorate in sciences, Chulalongkorn University, 1979
- Order of the Golden Ark from Prince Bernard of the Netherlands, 1980
- Knight Commander (Second Class) of the Most Noble Order of the Crown of Thailand, 1985

== Publications ==
Works authored or coauthored by him include:

- Lekagul, Boonsong (1968). Bird Guide of Thailand. (Illustrated by the author).
- Lekagul, Boonsong (1969). Monitors (Varanus) of Thailand. Conservation News of S.E. Asia 8: 31–32.
- Lekagul, Boonsong; Cronin, Paul (1974). Bird Guide of Thailand. (2nd edition). (Illustrated by the senior author). Bangkok: Association for the Conservation of Wildlife.
- Lekagul, Boonsong; Askins, Karen; Nabhitabhata, Jarujinta; Samruadit, Aroon (1977). Fieldguide to the Butterflies of Thailand. Bangkok: Association for the Conservation of Wildlife.
- Lekagul, Boonsong; McNeely, Jeffrey A. (1977). Mammals of Thailand.
- Lekagul, Boonsong; Round, Philip D. (1991). A Guide to the Birds of Thailand. (Illustrated by Mongkol Wongkalasin and Kamol Komolphalin). Thailand: Saha Karn Bhaet Co. ISBN 974-85673-6-2
