= Dixonius taoi =

Conservation status
- Vulnerable (IUCN 3.1)

Scientific classification
- Kingdom: Animalia
- Phylum: Chordata
- Class: Reptilia
- Order: Squamata
- Suborder: Gekkota
- Family: Gekkonidae
- Genus: Dixonius
- Species: D. taoi

Binomial name
- Dixonius taoi Botov, Phung, T.Q. Nguyen, Bauer, Brennan & Ziegler, 2015

Species of lizard

Dixonius taoi is a species of lizard in the family Gekkonidae. The species is endemic to Phú Quý Island in southern Vietnam.

== Etymology ==
The specific name, taoi, is in honor of Vietnamese herpetologist Tao Thien Nguyen.

== Habitat ==
The preferred natural habitat of D. taoi is forest, at altitudes near sea level.

== Description ==
D. taoi may attain a snout-to-vent length (SVL) of 4.4 cm (1.7 in).

== Reproduction ==
The mode of reproduction of D. taoi is unknown.
