= Macrocalamus gentingensis =

Conservation status
- Least Concern (IUCN 3.1)

Scientific classification
- Kingdom: Animalia
- Phylum: Chordata
- Class: Reptilia
- Order: Squamata
- Suborder: Serpentes
- Family: Colubridae
- Genus: Macrocalamus
- Species: M. gentingensis

Binomial name
- Macrocalamus gentingensis Yaakob & Lim, 2002

Species of snake

Macrocalamus gentingensis, the Genting Highlands reed snake, is a species of snake in the family Colubridae. The species is endemic to Malaysia.
