= Macrocalamus tweediei =

Conservation status
- Least Concern (IUCN 3.1)

Scientific classification
- Kingdom: Animalia
- Phylum: Chordata
- Class: Reptilia
- Order: Squamata
- Suborder: Serpentes
- Family: Colubridae
- Genus: Macrocalamus
- Species: M. tweediei

Binomial name
- Macrocalamus tweediei Lim, 1963

Species of snake

Macrocalamus tweediei, Tweedie's reed snake or Tweedie's mountain reed snake, is a species of snake in the family Colubridae. The species is endemic to Malaysia.
