= Calamaria strigiventris =

Scientific classification
- Kingdom: Animalia
- Phylum: Chordata
- Class: Reptilia
- Order: Squamata
- Suborder: Serpentes
- Family: Colubridae
- Genus: Calamaria
- Species: C. strigiventris

Binomial name
- Calamaria strigiventris Poyarkov, T.V. Nguyen, Orlov, & Vogel, 2019

Species of snake

Calamaria strigiventris, the striped-belly reed snake, is a species of snake of the family Colubridae. The snake is found in Vietnam.
