= Lycodon obvelatus =

Scientific classification
- Kingdom: Animalia
- Phylum: Chordata
- Class: Reptilia
- Order: Squamata
- Suborder: Serpentes
- Family: Colubridae
- Genus: Lycodon
- Species: L. obvelatus

Binomial name
- Lycodon obvelatus K. Wang, Yu, G. Vogel & Che, 2020}

Species of snake

Lycodon obvelatus, the recluse wolf snake, is a species of snake in the family Colubridae.

== Distribution ==
It is found in China.
