= Lycodon serratus =

Scientific classification
- Kingdom: Animalia
- Phylum: Chordata
- Class: Reptilia
- Order: Squamata
- Suborder: Serpentes
- Family: Colubridae
- Genus: Lycodon
- Species: L. serratus

Binomial name
- Lycodon serratus K. Wang, Yu, G. Vogel, & Che, 2020

Species of snake

Lycodon serratus, the serrate-banded wolf snake, is a species of snake in the family Colubridae.

== Distribution ==
It is found in China.
