= Oligodon saintgironsi =

Conservation status
- Data Deficient (IUCN 3.1)

Scientific classification
- Kingdom: Animalia
- Phylum: Chordata
- Class: Reptilia
- Order: Squamata
- Suborder: Serpentes
- Family: Colubridae
- Genus: Oligodon
- Species: O. saintgironsi

Binomial name
- Oligodon saintgironsi David, G. Vogel, & Pauwels, 2008

Species of snake

Oligodon saintgironsi, Saint Giron's kukri snake, is a species of snake of the family Colubridae.

The snake is found in Vietnam and Cambodia.
