= Dixonius mekongensis =

Mekong leaf-toed gecko

Scientific classification
- Kingdom: Animalia
- Phylum: Chordata
- Class: Reptilia
- Order: Squamata
- Suborder: Gekkota
- Family: Gekkonidae
- Genus: Dixonius
- Species: D. mekongensis

Binomial name
- Dixonius mekongensis Pauwels, Panitvong, Kunya, & Sumontha, 2021

Species of lizard

The Mekong leaf-toed gecko (Dixonius mekongensis) is a species of lizard in the family Gekkonidae. It is endemic to Thailand.
