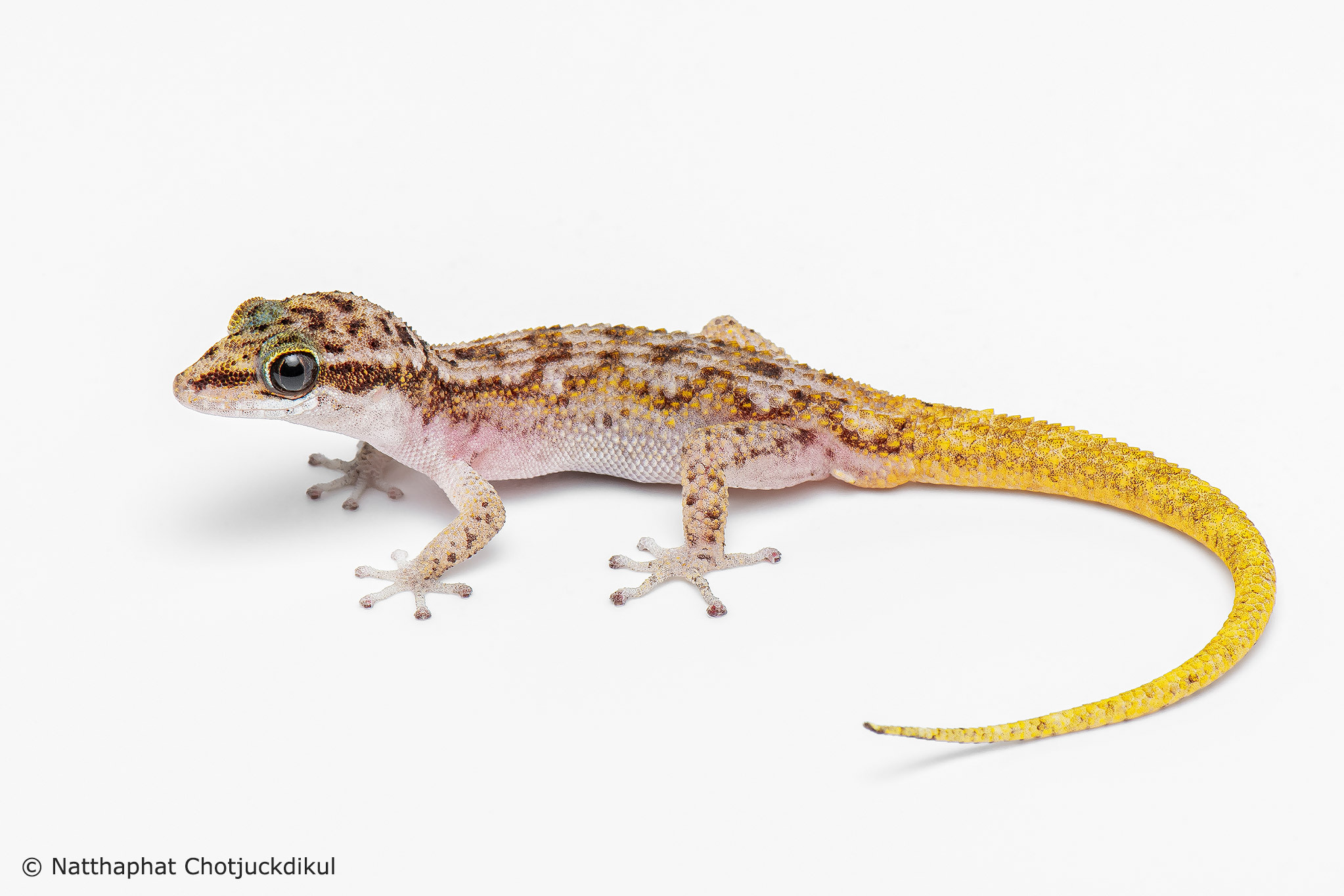
- Male

Scientific classification
- Kingdom: Animalia
- Phylum: Chordata
- Class: Reptilia
- Order: Squamata
- Suborder: Gekkota
- Family: Gekkonidae
- Genus: Dixonius
- Species: D. chotjuckdikuli

Binomial name
- Dixonius chotjuckdikuli Pauwels, Suthanthangjai, Donbundit, Suthanthangjai & Sumontha, 2024

= Dixonius chotjuckdikuli =

Species of leaf-toed gecko

Dixonius chotjuckdikuli, the Khao Ebid leaf-toed gecko, is a species of lizard in the family Gekkonidae. It is native to Thailand.

== Etymology ==
The specific name of the species, chotjuckdikuli, is in honor of the Thai naturalist Natthaphat Chotjuckdikul.

== Description ==
It is separated from other members of the genus Dixonius by its maximum snout to vent length of 4.56 centimeters (1.8 inches) and having 18 (sometimes 16) longitudinal rows of dorsal tubercles.

== Distribution ==
The type locality of this species is in Phetchaburi province, Thailand.
