= Trimeresurus gunaleni =

- A female Trimeresurus gunaleni at a snake breeding facility

Scientific classification
- Kingdom: Animalia
- Phylum: Chordata
- Class: Reptilia
- Order: Squamata
- Suborder: Serpentes
- Family: Viperidae
- Genus: Trimeresurus
- Species: T. gunaleni

Binomial name
- Trimeresurus gunaleni Vogel, David, and Sidik, 2014

Species of snake

Trimeresurus gunaleni, also known as Gunalen's pitviper, is a species of pit viper endemic to Sumatra (Indonesia). It is venomous.
