= Lycodon ophiophagus =

Conservation status
- Least Concern (IUCN 3.1)

Scientific classification
- Kingdom: Animalia
- Phylum: Chordata
- Class: Reptilia
- Order: Squamata
- Suborder: Serpentes
- Family: Colubridae
- Genus: Lycodon
- Species: L. ophiophagus

Binomial name
- Lycodon ophiophagus Vogel, David, Pauwels, Sumontha, Norval, Hendrix, Vu, & Ziegler, 2009

Species of snake

Lycodon ophiophagus, the snake-eater wolf snake, is a species of snake in the family Colubridae.

== Distribution ==
It is found in Thailand.

== Diet ==
Lycodon ophiophagus eats other snakes.
