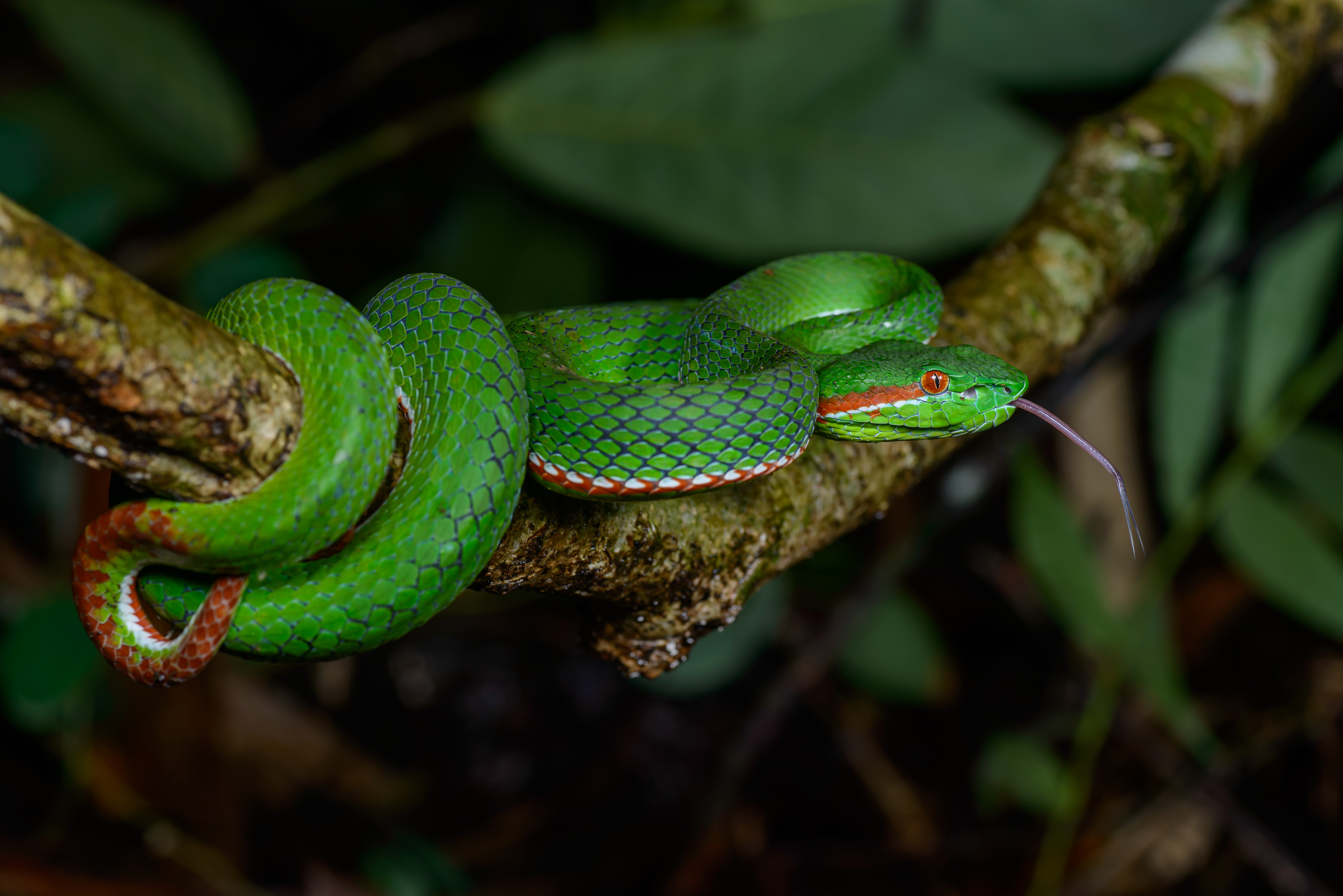
- Trimeresurus gumprechti (adult, male), Phu Hin Rong Kla National Park
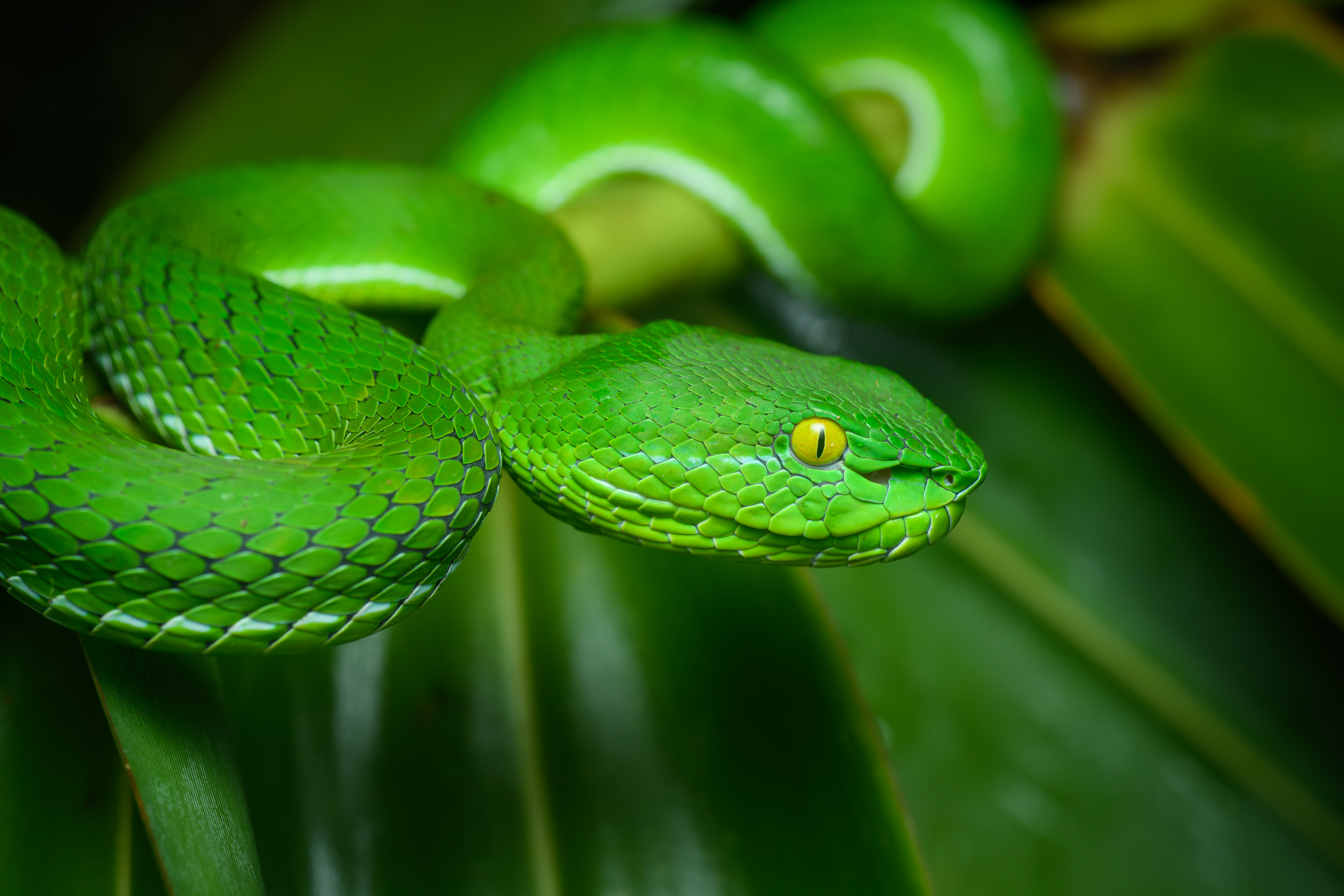
- Female, Phu Suan Sai National Park

Conservation status
- Least Concern (IUCN 3.1)

Scientific classification
- Kingdom: Animalia
- Phylum: Chordata
- Class: Reptilia
- Order: Squamata
- Suborder: Serpentes
- Family: Viperidae
- Genus: Trimeresurus
- Species: T. gumprechti

Binomial name
- Trimeresurus gumprechti David, Vogel, Pauwels & Vidal, 2002

Synonyms
- Trimeresurus gumprechti David, Vogel, Pauwels & Vidal, 2002; Viridovipera gumprechti — Malhotra & Thorpe, 2004; Trimeresurus (Viridovipera) gumprechti — David, Vogel & Dubois, 2011

= Trimeresurus gumprechti =

Species of snake

Trimeresurus gumprechti, known commonly as Gumprecht's green pit viper, is a species of venomous pit viper in the family Viperidae. The species is endemic to Asia.

== Geographic range ==
T. gumprechti is found in southern China (Yunnan), Laos, Myanmar, Thailand, and Vietnam.

== Habitat ==
The preferred natural habitat of T. gumprechti is forest, at altitudes of 300–1,570 m (980–5,150 ft).

== Taxonomy ==
T. gumprechti was described as a new species in 2002 by:

- Dr. Patrick David of the Muséum national d'histoire naturelle,
- Dr. Gernot Vogel of the Society for Southeast Asian Herpetology,
- Dr. Olivier S. G. Pauwels of the Smithsonian Institution,
- Dr. Nicolas Vidal of the Muséum national d'histoire naturelle.

== Description ==
T. gumprechti is strikingly bright green in color. A photo of this arboreal snake was chosen as the cover image of a 2008 report published by the World Wildlife Fund called "First Contact in the Greater Mekong: New Species Discoveries." Adults may attain a total length (including tail) of 1.3 m (4.3 ft).

== Behavior ==
T. gumprechti is arboreal.

== Reproduction ==
T. gumprechti is viviparous.

== Etymology ==
The specific name, gumprechti, is in honor of German herpetologist Andreas Gumprecht.

== Gallery ==
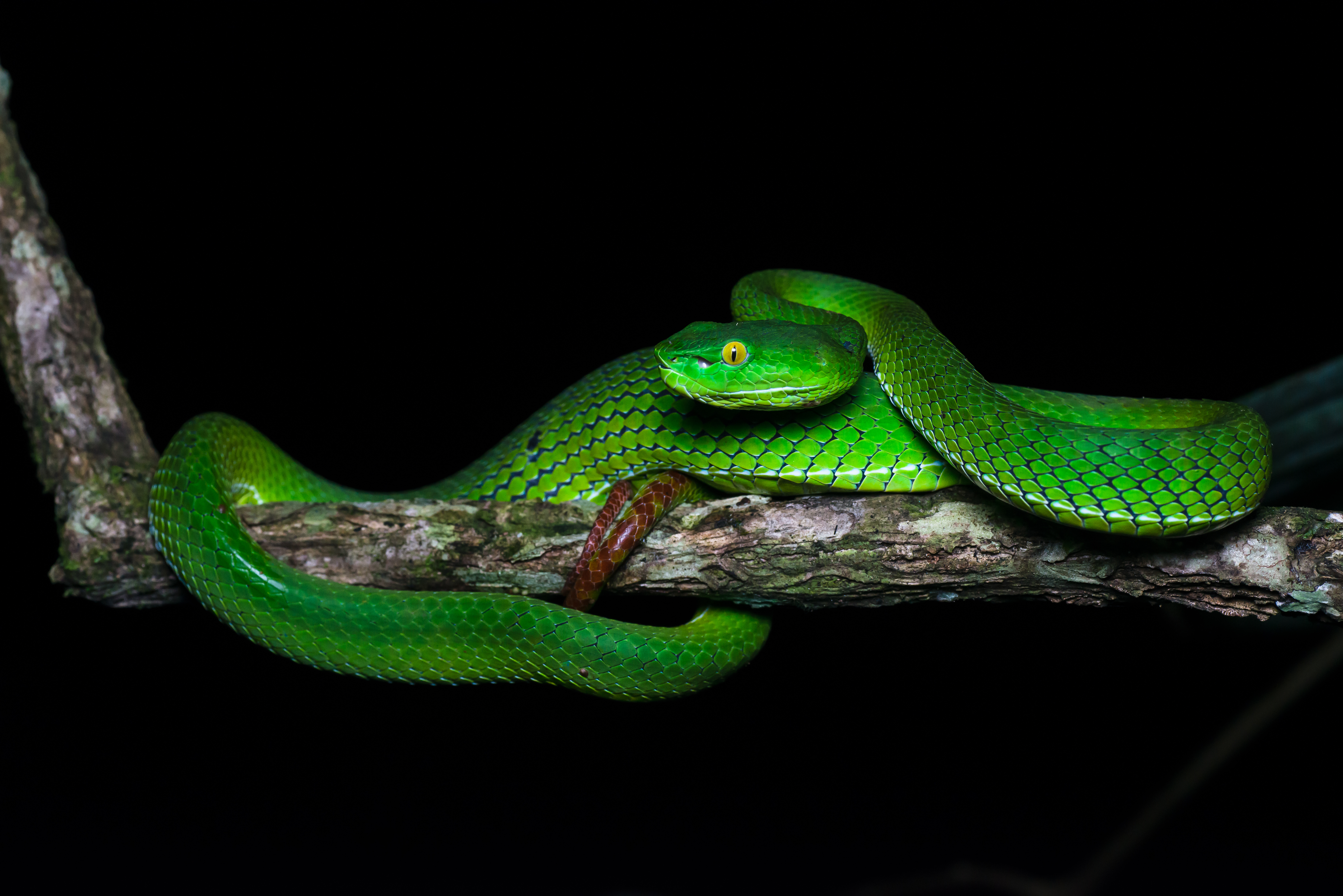
Adult female Trimeresurus gumprechti from Phu Hin Rong Kla National Park

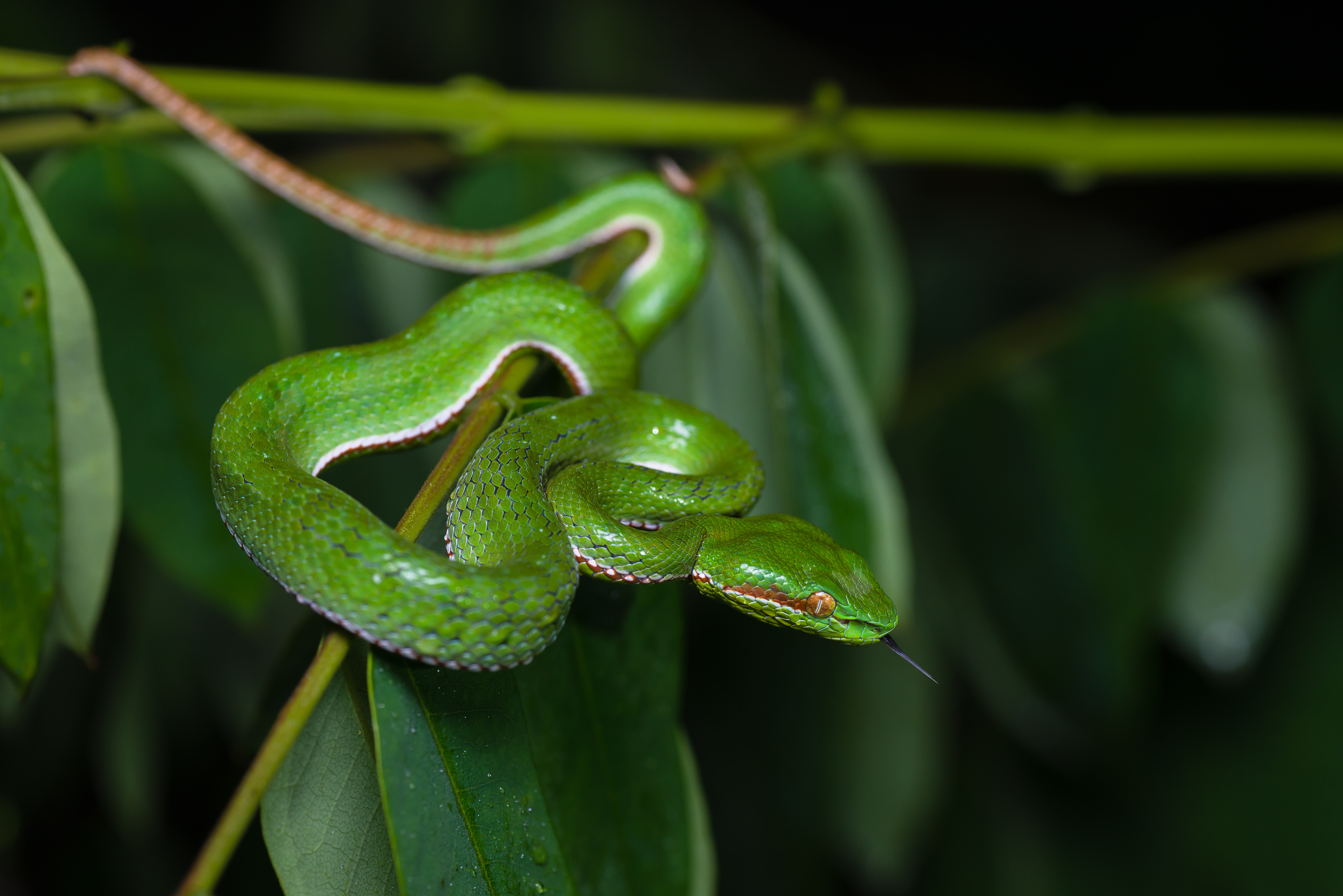
Juvenile male Trimeresurus gumprechti from Phu Hin Rong Kla National Park
