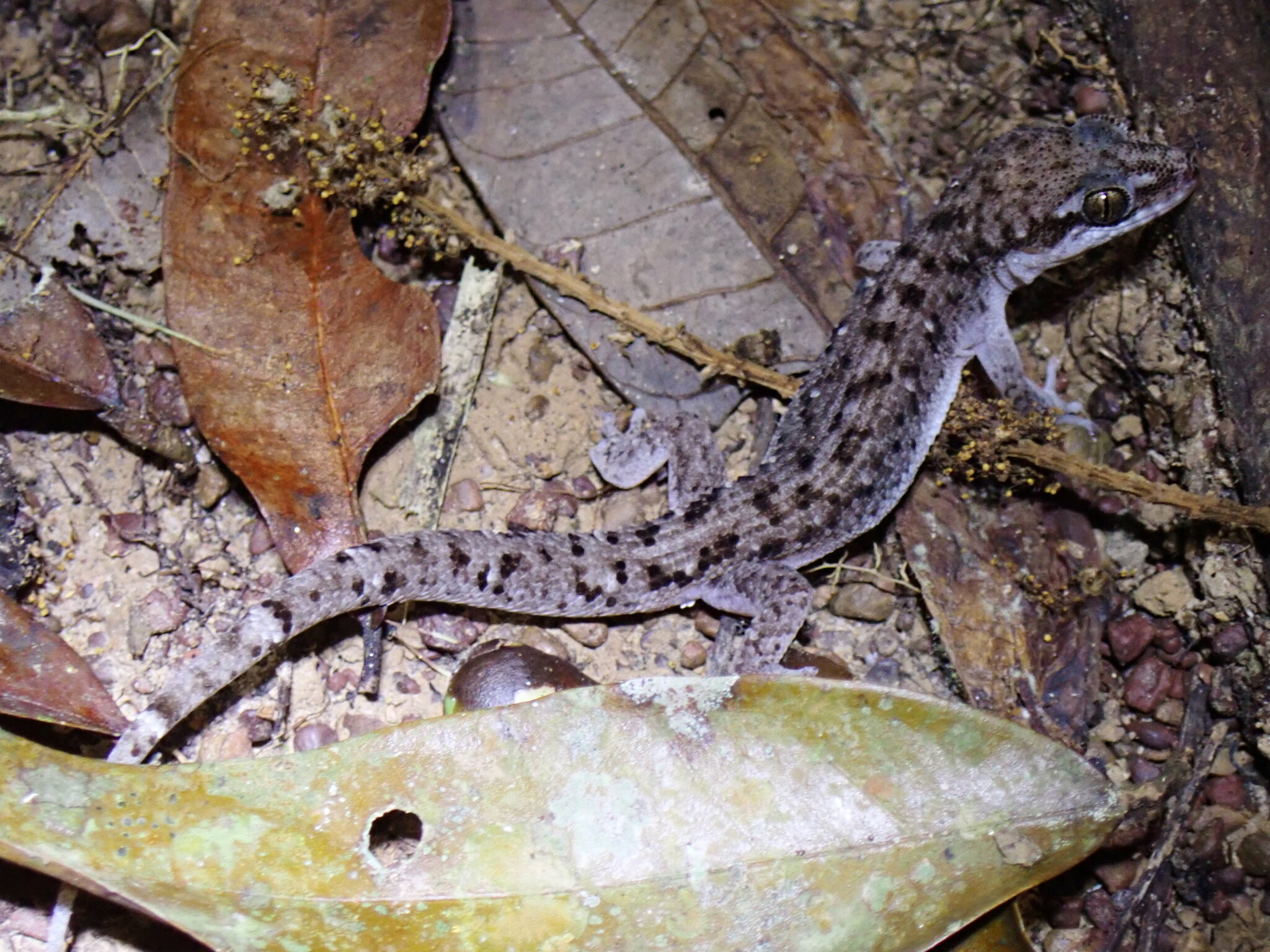

Conservation status
- Least Concern (IUCN 3.1)

Scientific classification
- Kingdom: Animalia
- Phylum: Chordata
- Class: Reptilia
- Order: Squamata
- Suborder: Gekkota
- Family: Gekkonidae
- Genus: Dixonius
- Species: D. minhlei

Binomial name
- Dixonius minhlei Ziegler, Botov, T.T. Nguyen, Bauer, Brennan, Ngo & T.Q. Nguyen, 2016

= Dixonius minhlei =

Species of lizard

Dixonius minhlei is a species of lizard in the family Gekkonidae. The species is endemic to southern Vietnam.

== Etymology ==
The specific name, minhlei, is in honor of Vietnamese herpetologist Minh Duc Le.

== Geographic range ==
D. minhlei is found in Dong Nai Province, Vietnam.

== Habitat ==
The preferred natural habitat of D. minhlei is forest.

== Reproduction ==
The mode of reproduction of D. minhlei is unknown.
