= Dendrelaphis levitoni =

Conservation status
- Least Concern (IUCN 3.1)

Scientific classification
- Kingdom: Animalia
- Phylum: Chordata
- Class: Reptilia
- Order: Squamata
- Suborder: Serpentes
- Family: Colubridae
- Subfamily: Ahaetuliinae
- Genus: Dendrelaphis
- Species: D. levitoni

Binomial name
- Dendrelaphis levitoni van Rooijen & G. Vogel, 2012

Species of snake

Dendrelaphis levitoni, Leviton's bronzeback tree snake, is a species of snake in the family Colubridae. The species is found in the Philippines.
