= Vietnamese leaf-toed gecko =

Conservation status
- Least Concern (IUCN 2.3)

Scientific classification
- Kingdom: Animalia
- Phylum: Chordata
- Class: Reptilia
- Order: Squamata
- Suborder: Gekkota
- Family: Gekkonidae
- Genus: Dixonius
- Species: D. vietnamensis

Binomial name
- Dixonius vietnamensis Das, 2004

Species of gecko

The Vietnamese leaf-toed gecko (Dixonius vietnamensis) is a species of lizards in the family Gekkonidae. It is native of Cambodia and Vietnam.
