= Dixonius =

Scientific classification
- Kingdom: Animalia
- Phylum: Chordata
- Class: Reptilia
- Order: Squamata
- Suborder: Gekkota
- Family: Gekkonidae
- Subfamily: Gekkoninae
- Genus: Dixonius; Bauer, Good & Branch, 1997

Genus of lizards

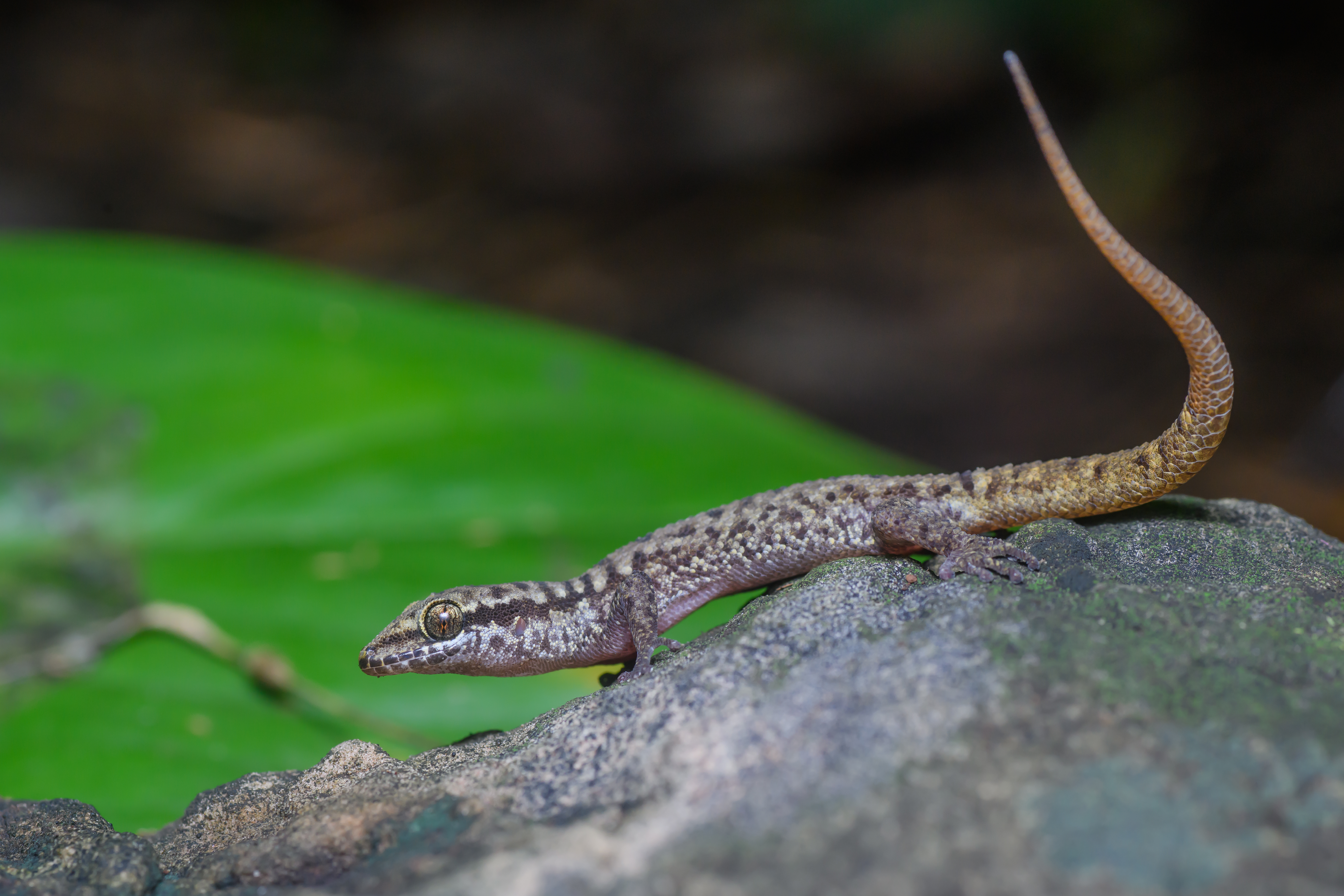

Dixonius is a genus of Asian geckos, commonly known as leaf-toed geckos.

== Etymology ==
The generic name, Dixonius, is in honor of American herpetologist James R. Dixon.

== Species ==
There are fifteen species that are recognized as being valid.

Species	Authority	Common name	Geographic range
D. aaronbaueri	V. Ngo & Ziegler, 2009	Bauer's leaf-toed gecko	Vietnam, Cambodia and Northeastern Thailand
D. chotjuckdikuli	Pauwels, Suthanthangjai, Donbundit, Suthanthangjai & Sumontha, 2024	Khao Ebid leaf-toed gecko	Thailand
D. dulayaphitakorum	Sumontha & Pauwels, 2020	Ranong leaf-toed gecko	Thailand
D. fulbrighti	Luu, Grismer, Hoang, Murdoch & Grismer, 2023	Fulbright leaf-toed gecko	Vietnam
D. hangseesom	Bauer, Sumontha, Grossmann, Pauwels & G. Vogel, 2004		Kanchanaburi, Western Thailand
D. kaweesaki	Sumontha, Chomngam, Phanamphon, Pawangkhanant, Viriyapanon, Thanaprayotsak & Pauwels, 2017	Sam Roi Yot leaf-toed gecko	Thailand
D. lao	T.H. Nguyen, Sitthivong, H. Ngo, Luu, T.Q. Nguyen, Le & Ziegler, 2020		Laos
D. melanostictus	(Taylor, 1962)	black-spotted leaf-toed gecko	Thailand
D. mekongensis	Pauwels, Panitvong, Kunya & Sumontha, 2021	Mekong leaf-toed gecko	Thailand
D. minhlei	Ziegler, Botov, T.T. Nguyen, Bauer, Brennan, H. Ngo & T.Q. Nguyen, 2016		Vietnam
D. pawangkhananti	Pauwels, Chomngam, Larsen & Sumontha, 2020	Cha-am leaf-toed gecko	Thailand
D. siamensis	(Boulenger, 1899)	Siamese leaf-toed gecko	Thailand
D. somchanhae	T.H. Nguyen, V. Luu, Sitthivong, H. Ngo, T.Q. Nguyen, Le & Ziegler, 2021		Laos
D. taoi	Botov, Phung, T.Q. Nguyen, Bauer, Brennan & Ziegler, 2015		Vietnam
D. vietnamensis	Das, 2004	Vietnamese leaf-toed gecko	Cambodia and Vietnam

Nota bene: A binomial authority in parentheses indicates that the species was originally described in a genus other than Dixonius.
