= Oligodon tolaki =

Scientific classification
- Kingdom: Animalia
- Phylum: Chordata
- Class: Reptilia
- Order: Squamata
- Suborder: Serpentes
- Family: Colubridae
- Genus: Oligodon
- Species: O. tolaki

Binomial name
- Oligodon tolaki Amarasinghe, Henkanaththegedara, Campbell, Riyanto, Hallermann, & G. Vogel, 2021

Species of snake

Oligodon tolaki is a species of snake of the family Colubridae.

The snake is found in Indonesia.
