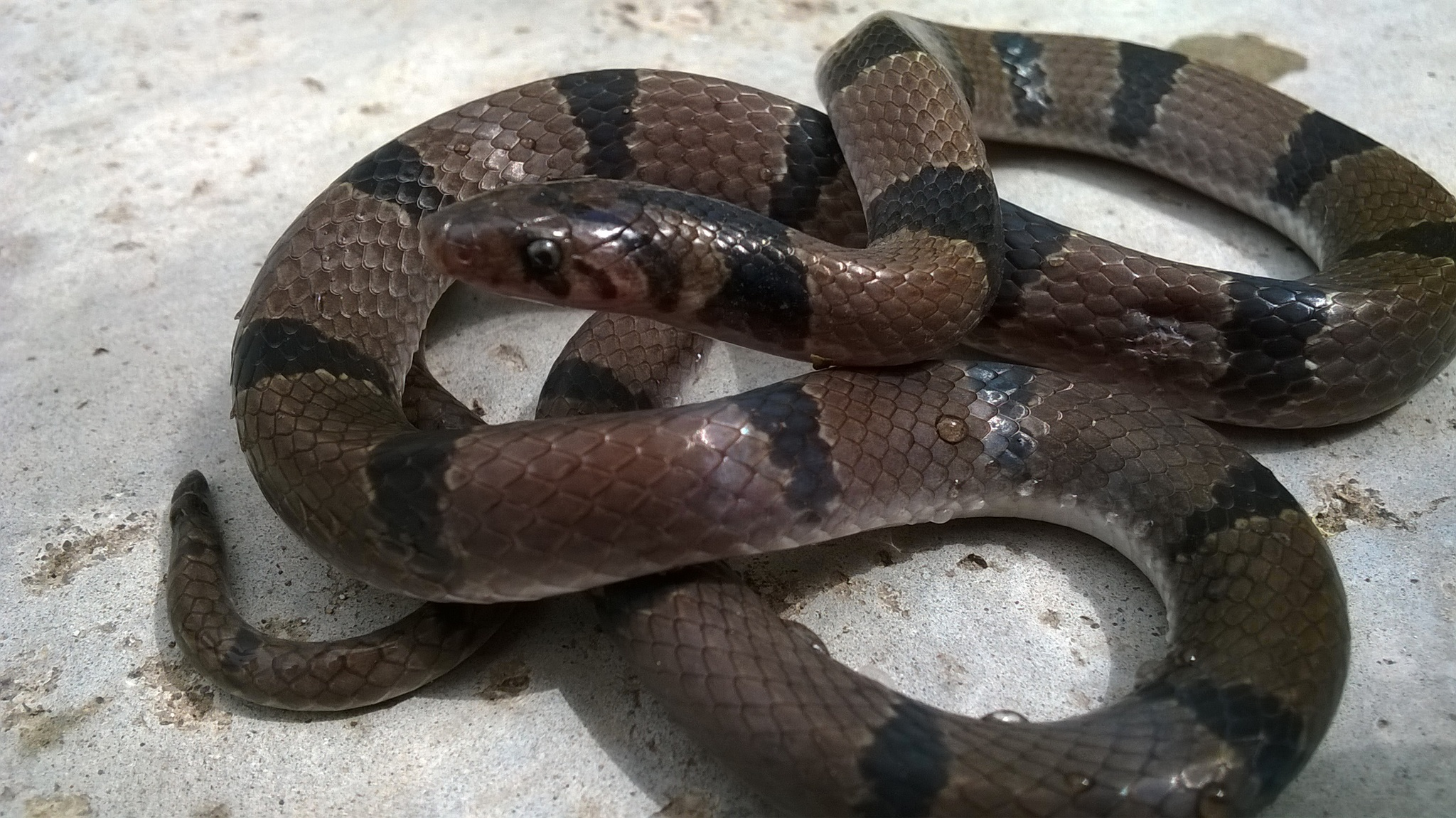
- From Gujarat

Scientific classification
- Kingdom: Animalia
- Phylum: Chordata
- Class: Reptilia
- Order: Squamata
- Suborder: Serpentes
- Family: Colubridae
- Genus: Oligodon
- Species: O. tillacki

Binomial name
- Oligodon tillacki Bandara, Ganesh, Kanishka, Danushka, Sharma, P. Campbell, Ineich, G. Vogel, & Amarasinghe, 2022

= Oligodon tillacki =

Species of snake

Oligodon tillacki, Tillack's kukri snake, is a species of snake of the family Colubridae. The snake is endemic to India and is widely distributed in the western parts of the country.

Oligodon tillacki can grow to 650 mm (25.6 in) in snout–vent length.
