= Dendrelaphis walli =

Conservation status
- Least Concern (IUCN 3.1)

Scientific classification
- Kingdom: Animalia
- Phylum: Chordata
- Class: Reptilia
- Order: Squamata
- Suborder: Serpentes
- Family: Colubridae
- Subfamily: Ahaetuliinae
- Genus: Dendrelaphis
- Species: D. walli

Binomial name
- Dendrelaphis walli Vogel & van Rooijen, 2011

Species of snake

Dendrelaphis walli is a species of snake in the family Colubridae. The species is endemic to Myanmar.
