= Lycodon liuchengchaoi =

Scientific classification
- Kingdom: Animalia
- Phylum: Chordata
- Class: Reptilia
- Order: Squamata
- Suborder: Serpentes
- Family: Colubridae
- Genus: Lycodon
- Species: L. liuchengchaoi

Binomial name
- Lycodon liuchengchaoi Zhang, Jiang, Vogel, & Rao, 2011

Species of snake

Lycodon liuchengchaoi is a species of snake in the family colubridae. It is found in China.
