= Macrocalamus emas =

Scientific classification
- Kingdom: Animalia
- Phylum: Chordata
- Class: Reptilia
- Order: Squamata
- Suborder: Serpentes
- Family: Colubridae
- Genus: Macrocalamus
- Species: M. emas

Binomial name
- Macrocalamus emas Quah, Anuar, Grismer, Wood, & Nor, 2019

Species of snake

Macrocalamus emas, the golden-bellied reed snake, is a species of snake in the family Colubridae. The species is endemic to Malaysia.
