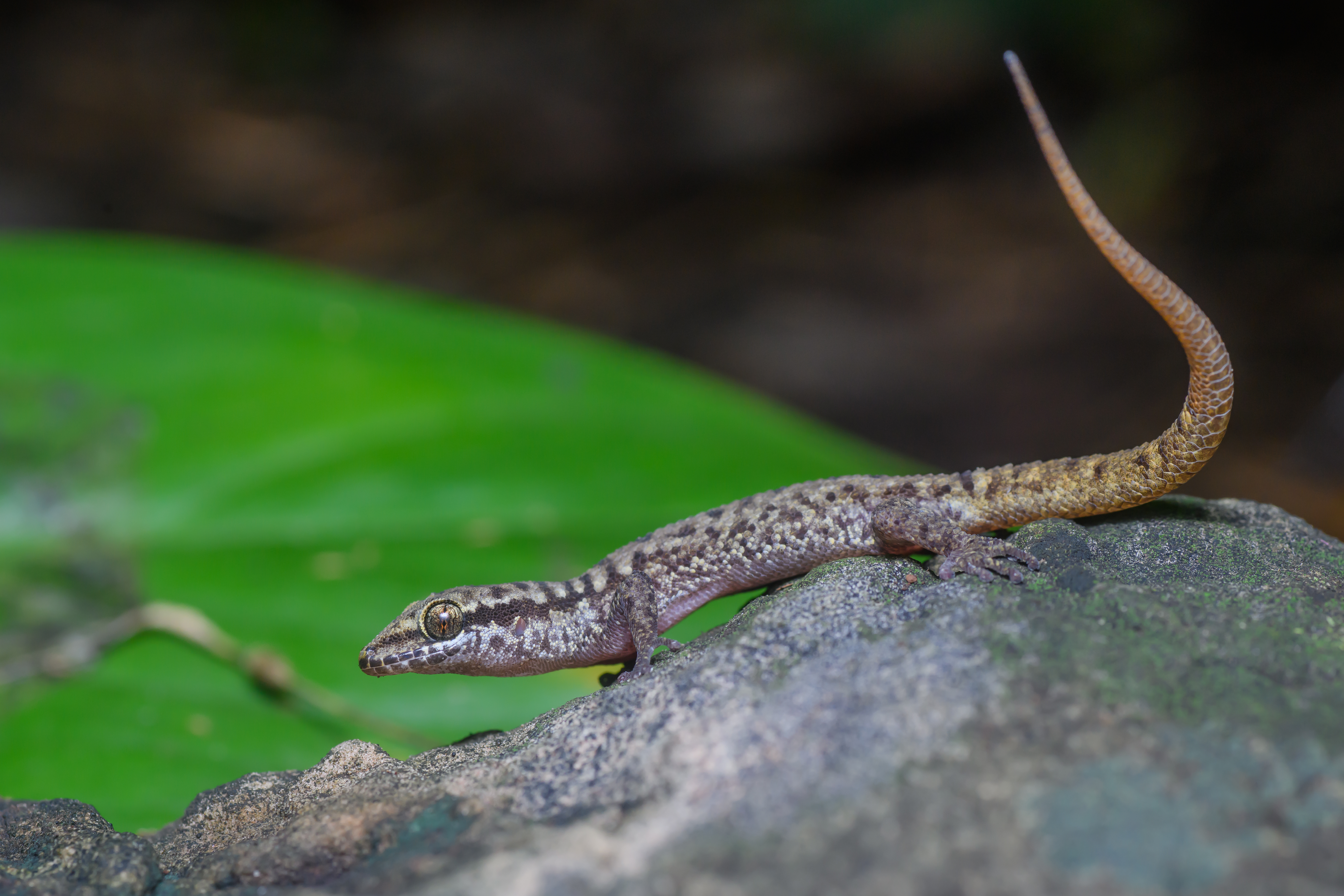

Scientific classification
- Kingdom: Animalia
- Phylum: Chordata
- Class: Reptilia
- Order: Squamata
- Suborder: Gekkota
- Family: Gekkonidae
- Genus: Dixonius
- Species: D. hangseesom

Binomial name
- Dixonius hangseesom Bauer, Sumontha, Grossmann, Pauwels, & Vogel, 2004

= Dixonius hangseesom =

Species of lizard

Dixonius hangseesom is a species of lizard in the family Gekkonidae. It is endemic to Thailand.
