= Oligodon moricei =

Conservation status
- Data Deficient (IUCN 3.1)

Scientific classification
- Kingdom: Animalia
- Phylum: Chordata
- Class: Reptilia
- Order: Squamata
- Suborder: Serpentes
- Family: Colubridae
- Genus: Oligodon
- Species: O. moricei

Binomial name
- Oligodon moricei David, G. Vogel & van Rooijen, 2008

Species of snake

Oligodon moricei, commonly known as Morice's kukri snake, is a species of snake in the subfamily Colubrinae of the family Colubridae. The species is native to southern Vietnam.

== Etymology ==
The specific name, moricei, is in honor of French naturalist Jean Claude Albert Morice.

== Description ==
The species Oligodon moricei differs from its cogenerates by the combination of a "rusty brown" vertebral stripe edged by two black stripes, 12 maxillary teeth, 17 dorsal scale rows, a large number of ventral scales, seven supralabials, and a dark belly.
