= Macrocalamus lateralis =

Conservation status
- Least Concern (IUCN 3.1)

Scientific classification
- Kingdom: Animalia
- Phylum: Chordata
- Class: Reptilia
- Order: Squamata
- Suborder: Serpentes
- Family: Colubridae
- Genus: Macrocalamus
- Species: M. lateralis

Binomial name
- Macrocalamus lateralis Günther, 1864

Species of snake

Macrocalamus lateralis, the side-blotched reed snake, Malayan mountain reed snake, or striped reed snake, is a species of snake in the family Colubridae. The species is endemic to southern Thailand and Peninsular Malaysia.
