= Dixonius pawangkhananti =

Scientific classification
- Kingdom: Animalia
- Phylum: Chordata
- Class: Reptilia
- Order: Squamata
- Suborder: Gekkota
- Family: Gekkonidae
- Genus: Dixonius
- Species: D. pawangkhananti

Binomial name
- Dixonius pawangkhananti Pauwels, Chomngam, Larsen & Sumontha, 2020

Species of lizard

Dixonius pawangkhananti is a species of lizard in the family Gekkonidae. The species is endemic to Thailand.

== Etymology ==
The specific name, pawangkhananti, is in honor of Thai herpetologist Parinya Pawangkhanant.

== Geographic range ==
D. pawangkhananti is found in Phetchaburi Province, peninsular Thailand.

== Description ==
Large for its genus, D. pawangkhananti may attain a snout-to-vent length (SVL) of 4.26 cm (1.68 in).

== Reproduction ==
The mode of reproduction of D. pawangkhananti is unknown.
