= Macrocalamus jasoni =

Conservation status
- Least Concern (IUCN 3.1)

Scientific classification
- Kingdom: Animalia
- Phylum: Chordata
- Class: Reptilia
- Order: Squamata
- Suborder: Serpentes
- Family: Colubridae
- Genus: Macrocalamus
- Species: M. jasoni

Binomial name
- Macrocalamus jasoni Grandison, 1972

Species of snake

Macrocalamus jasoni, also known commonly as Jason's mountain reed snake and Jason's reed snake, is a species of snake in the subfamily Calamariinae of the family Colubridae. The species is endemic to Malaysia.

== Etymology ==
The specific name, jasoni, is in honor of John Jason Gathorne-Hardy, who is a British zoologist and artist.

== Geographic range ==
M. jasoni is found in Pahang, Peninsular Malaysia, Malaysia.

== Habitat ==
The preferred natural habitat of M. jasoni is forest, at altitudes of 1,768–1,981 m (5,801–6,499 ft).

== Description ==
M. jasoni may attain a total length (including tail) of 75.2 cm (29.6 in). It has smooth dorsal scales, which are arranged in 15 rows at midbody. The ventral scales number 131–133. Dorsally it is black with two orange stripes, and ventrally it is bright yellow (Vogel & David, 1999).

== Behavior ==
M. jasoni is terrestrial and semi-fossorial.

== Reproduction ==
M. jasoni is oviparous.
