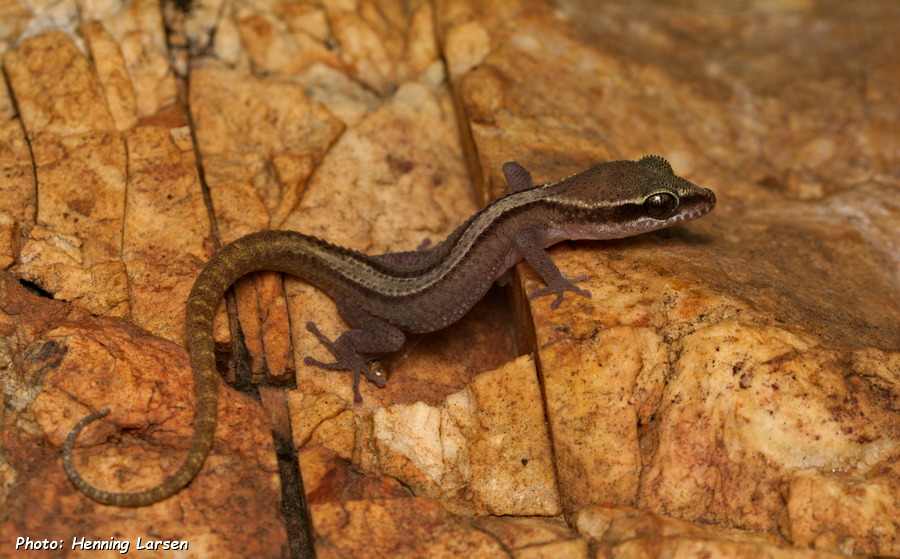
- Dixonius kaweesaki

Conservation status
- Critically Endangered (IUCN 3.1)

Scientific classification
- Kingdom: Animalia
- Phylum: Chordata
- Class: Reptilia
- Order: Squamata
- Suborder: Gekkota
- Family: Gekkonidae
- Genus: Dixonius
- Species: D. kaweesaki

Binomial name
- Dixonius kaweesaki Sumontha, Chomngam, Phanamphon, Pawangkhanant, Viriyapanon, Thanaprayotsak & Pauwels, 2017

= Sam Roi Yot leaf-toed gecko =

Species of lizard

The Sam Roi Yot leaf-toed gecko (Dixonius kaweesaki) is a species of lizard in the family Gekkonidae. The species is endemic to Thailand.

== Etymology ==
The specific name, kaweesaki, is in honor of Thai naturalist Kaweesak Keeratikiat.

== Geographic range ==
D. kaweesaki is found in Prachuap Khiri Khan Province, Thailand.

== Habitat ==
The preferred natural habitat of D. kaweesaki is rocky areas in shrubland, at altitudes of 5–300 m (16–984 ft).

== Reproduction ==
The mode of reproduction of D. kaweesaki is unknown.

== Gallery ==
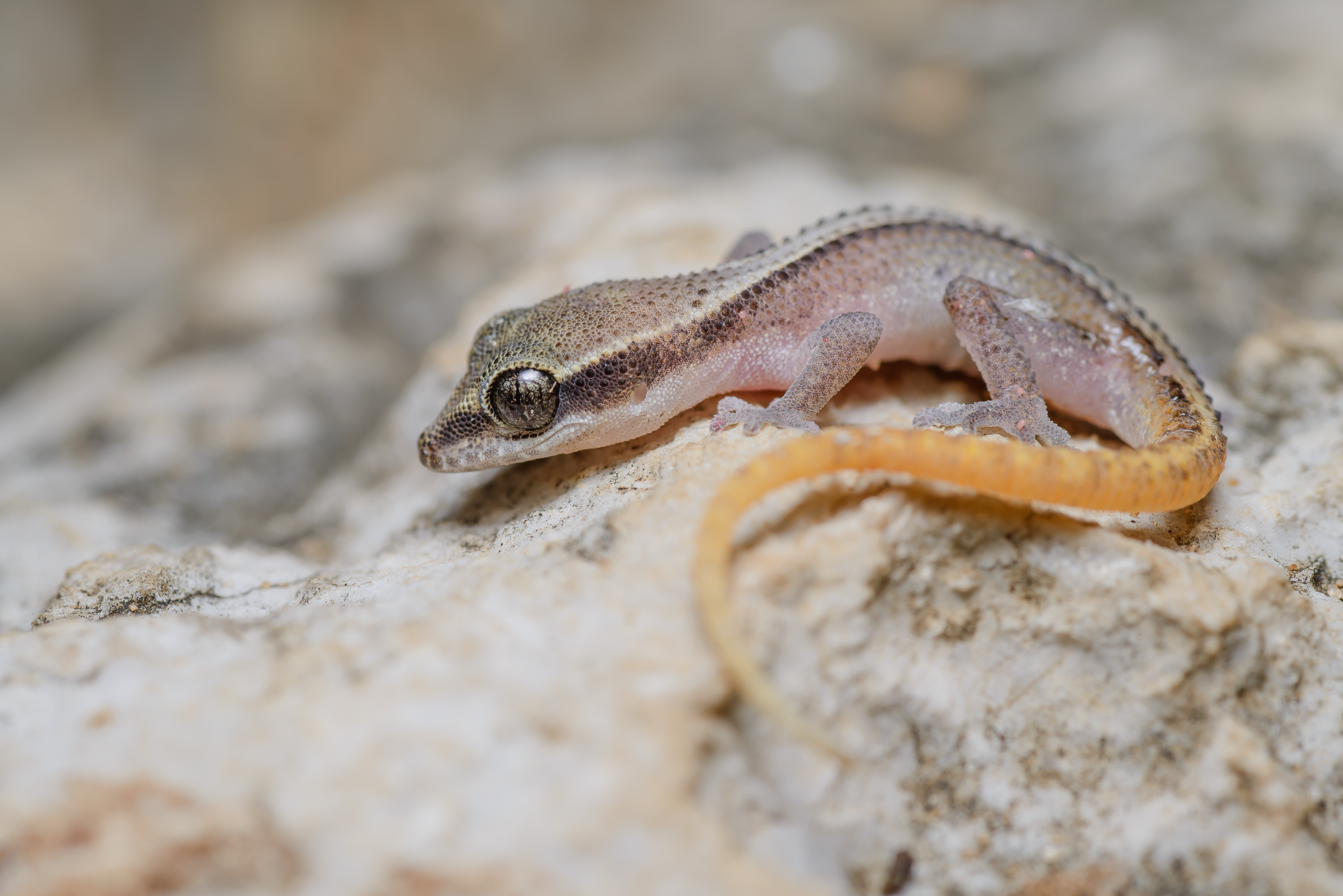
Dixonius kaweesaki

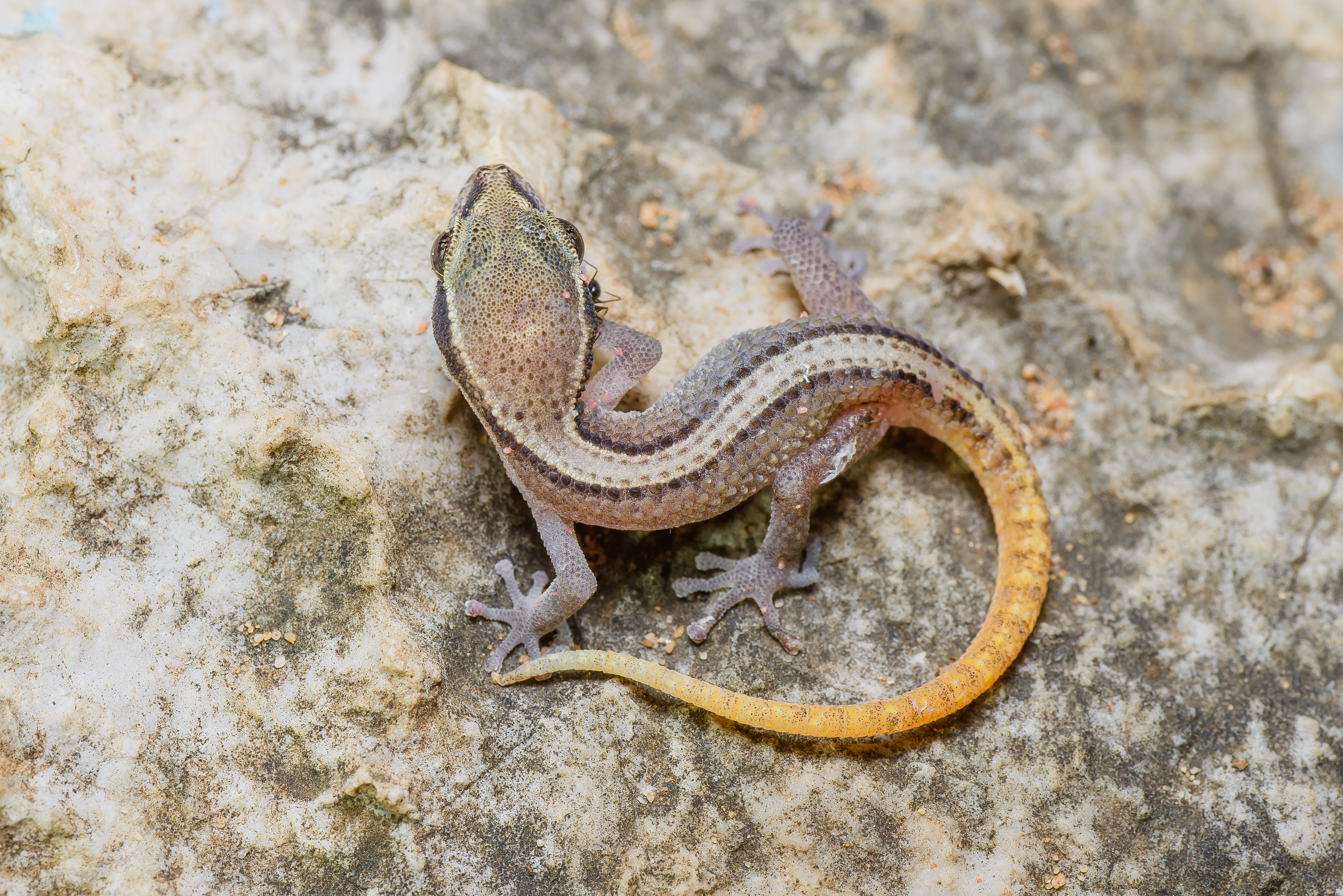
Dixonius kaweesaki
