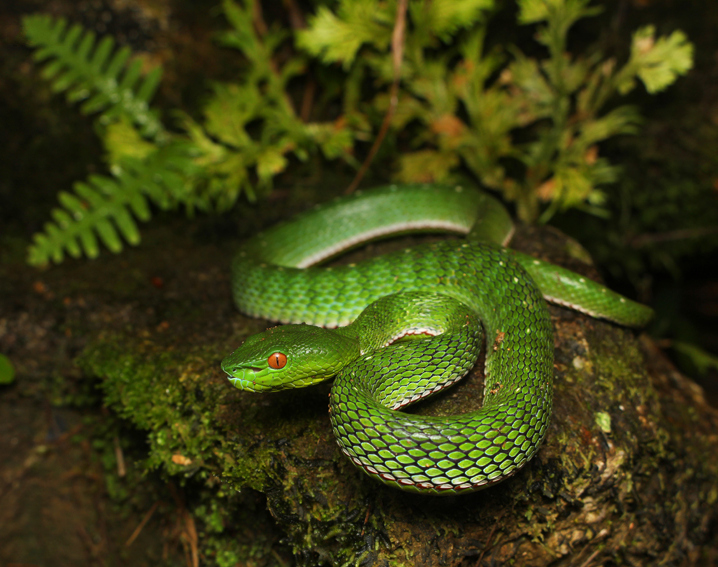

Conservation status
- Least Concern (IUCN 3.1)

Scientific classification
- Kingdom: Animalia
- Phylum: Chordata
- Class: Reptilia
- Order: Squamata
- Suborder: Serpentes
- Family: Viperidae
- Genus: Trimeresurus
- Species: T. vogeli

Binomial name
- Trimeresurus vogeli David, Vidal & Pauwels, 2001

Synonyms
- Trimeresurus vogeli David, Vidal & Pauwels, 2001; Viridovipera vogeli — Malhotra & Thorpe, 2004; Trimeresurus (Viridovipera) vogeli — David, G. Vogel & Dubois, 2011; Trimeresurus vogeli — Li Vigni, 2013

= Trimeresurus vogeli =

Species of snake

Trimeresurus vogeli, commonly known as the Vogel's pit viper, is a venomous pitviper species native to Southeast Asia.

== Etymology ==
The specific name, vogeli, is in honor of German herpetologist Gernot Vogel.

== Geographic range ==
Trimeresurus vogeli is found in Cambodia, Laos, Thailand, and Vietnam.

== Habitat ==
The preferred natural habitats of Trimeresurus vogeli are forest and savanna, at altitudes of 200–1,200 m (660–3,940 ft).

== Description ==
Trimeresurus vogeli is large for its genus, and exhibits definite sexual dimorphism. Males may attain a snout-to-vent length (SVL) of 0.8 m (2.6 ft). Females are longer, and may exceed 1.1 m (3.6 ft) in SVL.

== Reproduction ==
Trimeresurus vogeli is viviparous.
