= Oligodon wagneri =

Conservation status
- Data Deficient (IUCN 3.1)

Scientific classification
- Kingdom: Animalia
- Phylum: Chordata
- Class: Reptilia
- Order: Squamata
- Suborder: Serpentes
- Family: Colubridae
- Genus: Oligodon
- Species: O. wagneri

Binomial name
- Oligodon wagneri David & G. Vogel, 2012

Species of snake

Oligodon wagneri, Wagner's kukri snake, is a species of snake of the family Colubridae.

The snake is found in Indonesia.
