= Dixonius lao =

Scientific classification
- Kingdom: Animalia
- Phylum: Chordata
- Class: Reptilia
- Order: Squamata
- Suborder: Gekkota
- Family: Gekkonidae
- Genus: Dixonius
- Species: D. lao

Binomial name
- Dixonius lao Nguyen, Sitthivong, Ngo, Luu, Nguyen, Le & Ziegler, 2020

Species of lizard

Dixonius lao is a species of lizard in the family Gekkonidae. It is endemic to Laos.
