= Lycodon davidi =

Scientific classification
- Kingdom: Animalia
- Phylum: Chordata
- Class: Reptilia
- Order: Squamata
- Suborder: Serpentes
- Family: Colubridae
- Genus: Lycodon
- Species: L. davidi

Binomial name
- Lycodon davidi Vogel, Nguyen, Kingsada &, & Ziegler, 2012

Species of lizard

Lycodon davidi, David's wolf snake, is a species of snake found in Laos.
