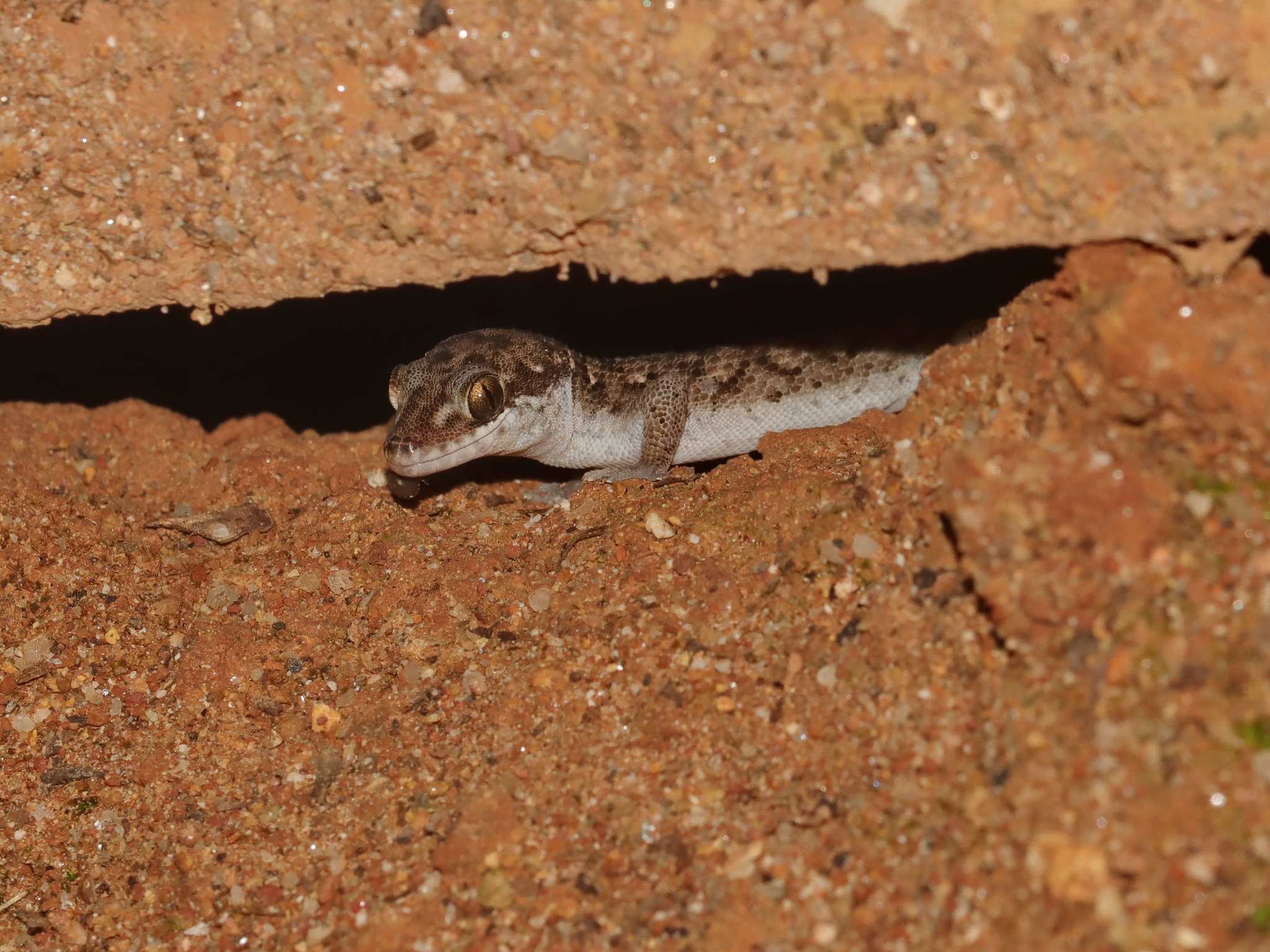

Scientific classification
- Kingdom: Animalia
- Phylum: Chordata
- Class: Reptilia
- Order: Squamata
- Suborder: Gekkota
- Family: Gekkonidae
- Genus: Dixonius
- Species: D. dulayaphitakorum

Binomial name
- Dixonius dulayaphitakorum Sumontha & Pauwels, 2020

= Dixonius dulayaphitakorum =

Species of lizard

Dixonius dulayaphitakorum is a species of lizard in the family Gekkonidae. It is endemic to Thailand.
