= Black-spotted leaf-toed gecko =

Conservation status
- Least Concern (IUCN 3.1)

Scientific classification
- Kingdom: Animalia
- Phylum: Chordata
- Class: Reptilia
- Order: Squamata
- Suborder: Gekkota
- Family: Gekkonidae
- Genus: Dixonius
- Species: D. melanostictus

Binomial name
- Dixonius melanostictus (Taylor, 1962)

Synonyms
- Phyllodactylus melanostictus Taylor, 1962

Species of lizard

The black-spotted leaf-toed gecko or scarce ground gecko (Dixonius melanostictus) is a species of lizard in the family Gekkonidae. It is endemic to Thailand.
