= Oligodon teyniei =

Scientific classification
- Kingdom: Animalia
- Phylum: Chordata
- Class: Reptilia
- Order: Squamata
- Suborder: Serpentes
- Family: Colubridae
- Genus: Oligodon
- Species: O. teyniei

Binomial name
- Oligodon teyniei David, Hauser, & G. Vogel, 2022

Species of snake

Oligodon teyniei, Teynié's kukri snake, is a species of snake of the family Colubridae.

The snake is found in Laos.
