= Lycodon gongshan =

Conservation status
- Data Deficient (IUCN 3.1)

Scientific classification
- Kingdom: Animalia
- Phylum: Chordata
- Class: Reptilia
- Order: Squamata
- Suborder: Serpentes
- Family: Colubridae
- Genus: Lycodon
- Species: L. gongshan

Binomial name
- Lycodon gongshan G. Vogel & Luo, 2011

Species of snake

The Gongshan wolf snake, (Lycodon gongshan) is a species of snake in the family colubridae. It is found in China.
