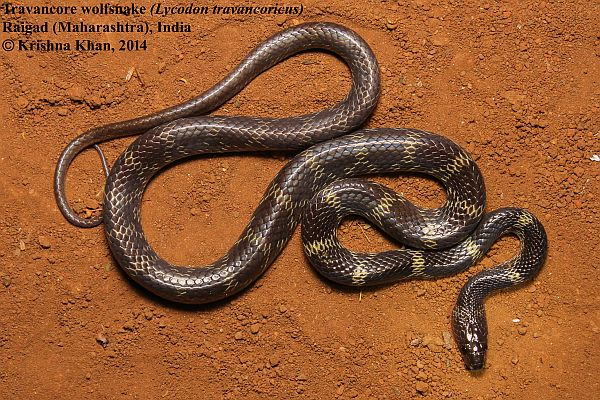

Conservation status
- Least Concern (IUCN 3.1)

Scientific classification
- Kingdom: Animalia
- Phylum: Chordata
- Class: Reptilia
- Order: Squamata
- Suborder: Serpentes
- Family: Colubridae
- Genus: Lycodon
- Species: L. travancoricus

Binomial name
- Lycodon travancoricus (Beddome, 1870)

Synonyms
- Cercaspis travancoricus Beddome, 1870; Lycodon travancoricus – Boulenger, 1890; Lycodon aulicus travancoricus – Constable, 1940; Lycodon travancoricus – M.A. Smith, 1943

= Lycodon travancoricus =

Species of snake

Lycodon travancoricus, commonly known as the Travancore wolf snake, is a species of colubrid snake endemic to south India.

== Description ==
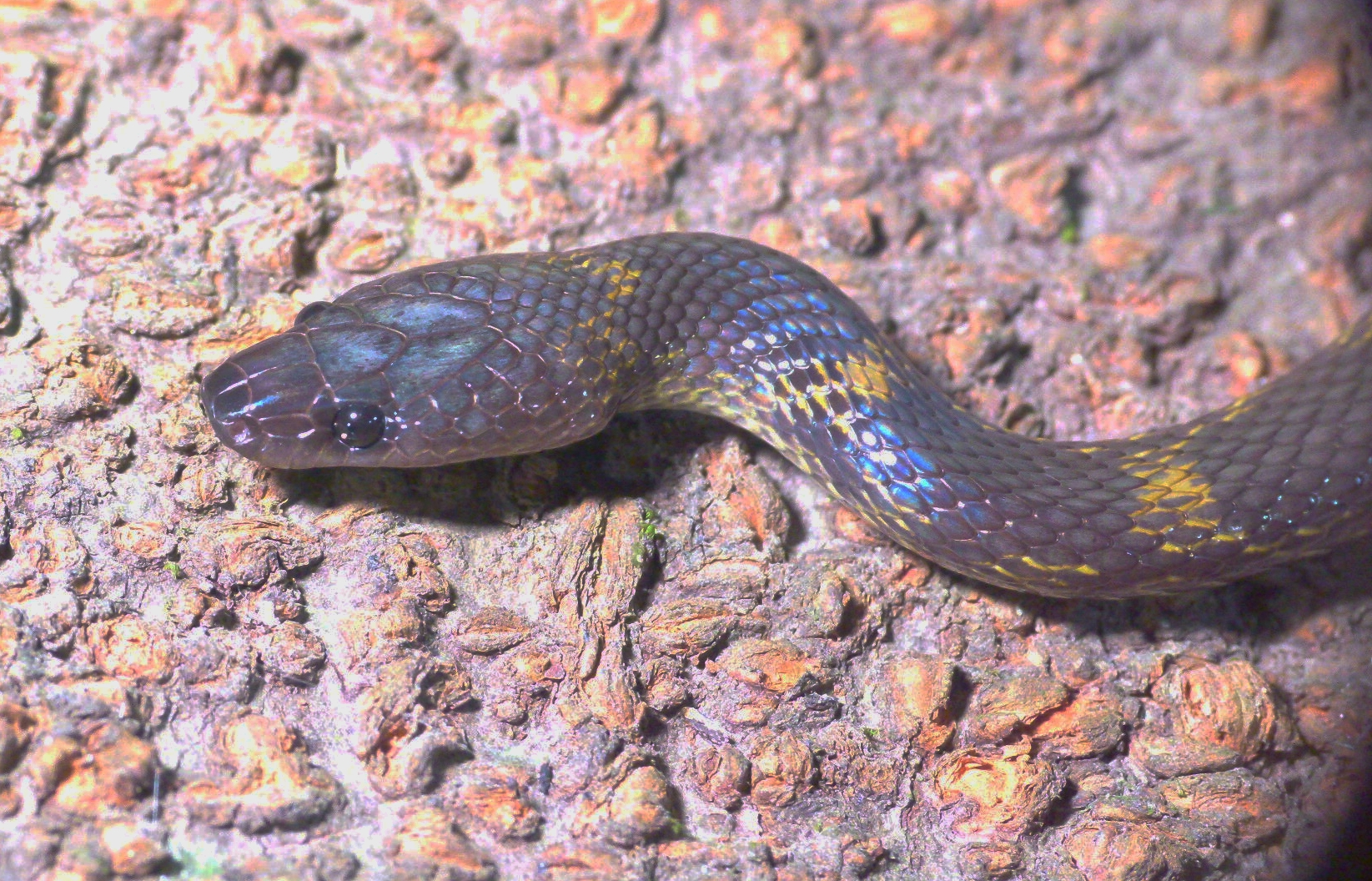
Head

Lycodon travancoricus is dark brown or black dorsally, with white crossbands and white lineolations on the sides. Ventrally it is uniform white. It is very similar to Lycodon striatus, but the upper lip is brown, or white spotted with brown.

The dorsal scales are smooth, in 17 rows. The ventrals number 175-202; the anal is entire; and the subcaudals are 56–76, usually double, but sometimes single.

Adults may attain 60 cm (23 1/2 inches) in total length, with a tail 12.5 cm (4 7/8 inches) long Maximum 742mm (29 in).

== Geographic range ==
It is endemic to Peninsular India. It is a hill-dwelling species, preferring high-elevation wet forests. It occurs in the Western Ghats across Kerala, Tamil Nadu, Karnataka, Goa, southern Gujarat and southern parts of the Eastern Ghats in Tamil Nadu. and also in the Maldives.

Populations from the Eastern Ghats and Deccan Plateau in Andhra Pradesh and Karnataka previously mistaken to be this species, have now been classified as a distinct species Lycodon deccanensis.

== Habits and Habitat ==
It is a nocturnal, oviparous, non-venomous snake. It prefers forests, both evergreen and deciduous, on windward plains and hills.
