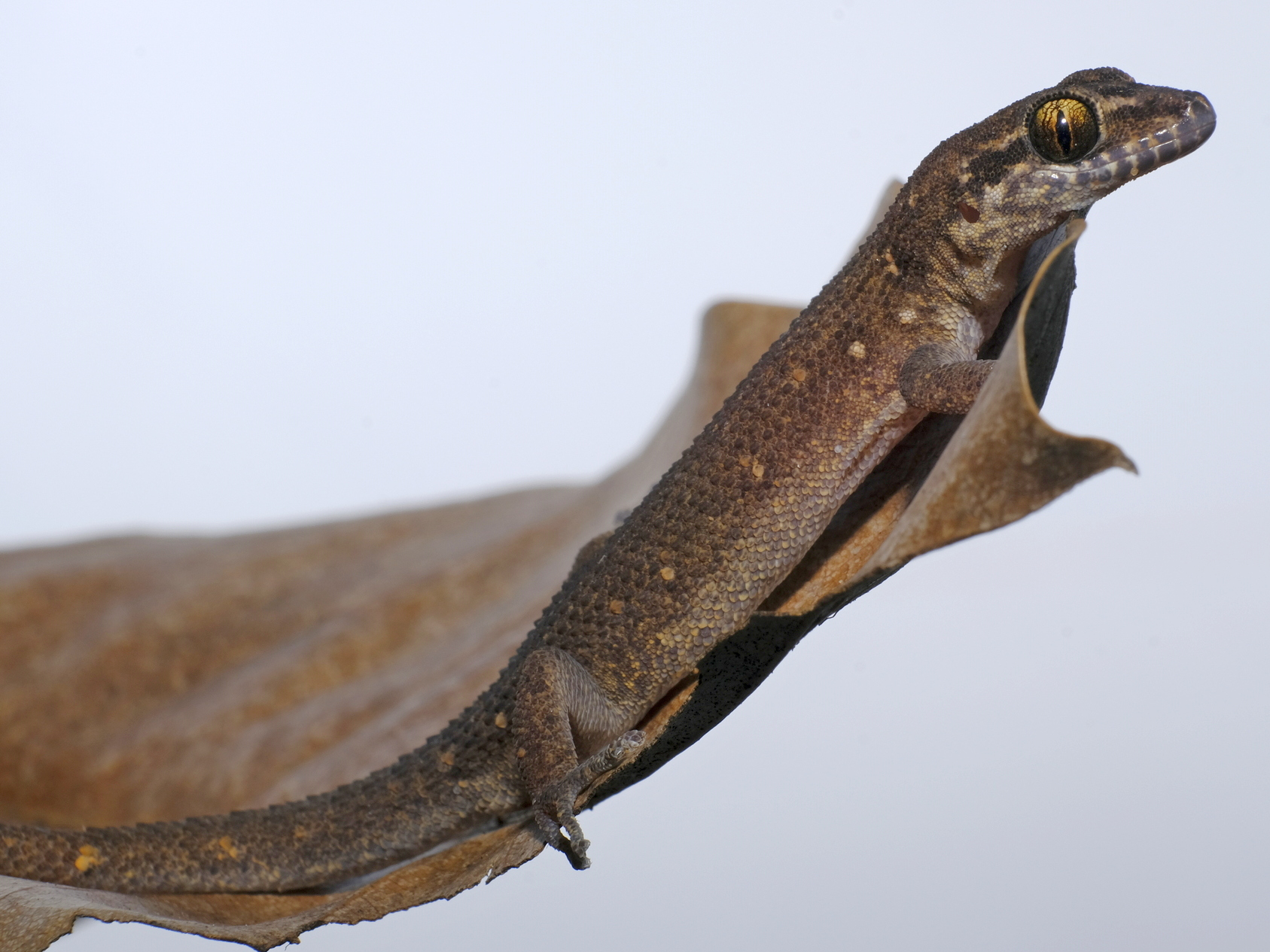

Conservation status
- Least Concern (IUCN 3.1)

Scientific classification
- Kingdom: Animalia
- Phylum: Chordata
- Class: Reptilia
- Order: Squamata
- Suborder: Gekkota
- Family: Gekkonidae
- Genus: Dixonius
- Species: D. aaronbaueri

Binomial name
- Dixonius aaronbaueri Ngo & Ziegler, 2009

= Bauer's leaf-toed gecko =

Species of lizard

Bauer's leaf-toed gecko (Dixonius aaronbaueri) is a species of lizard in the family Gekkonidae. The species is endemic to Vietnam.

== Etymology ==
The specific name, aaronbaueri, is in honor of American herpetologist Aaron M. Bauer.

== Geographic range ==
D. aaronbaueri is found in southern Vietnam, in Binh Thuan Province and Ninh Thuan Province.

== Habitat ==
The preferred natural habitats of D. aaronbaueri are forest and sand dunes, at altitudes from sea level to 5 m (16 ft), but it has also been found in plantations.

== Description ==
D. aaronbaueri may attain a snout-to-vent length (SVL) of almost 4 cm (1.6 in).

== Reproduction ==
The mode of reproduction of D. aaronbaueri has not been ascertained.
