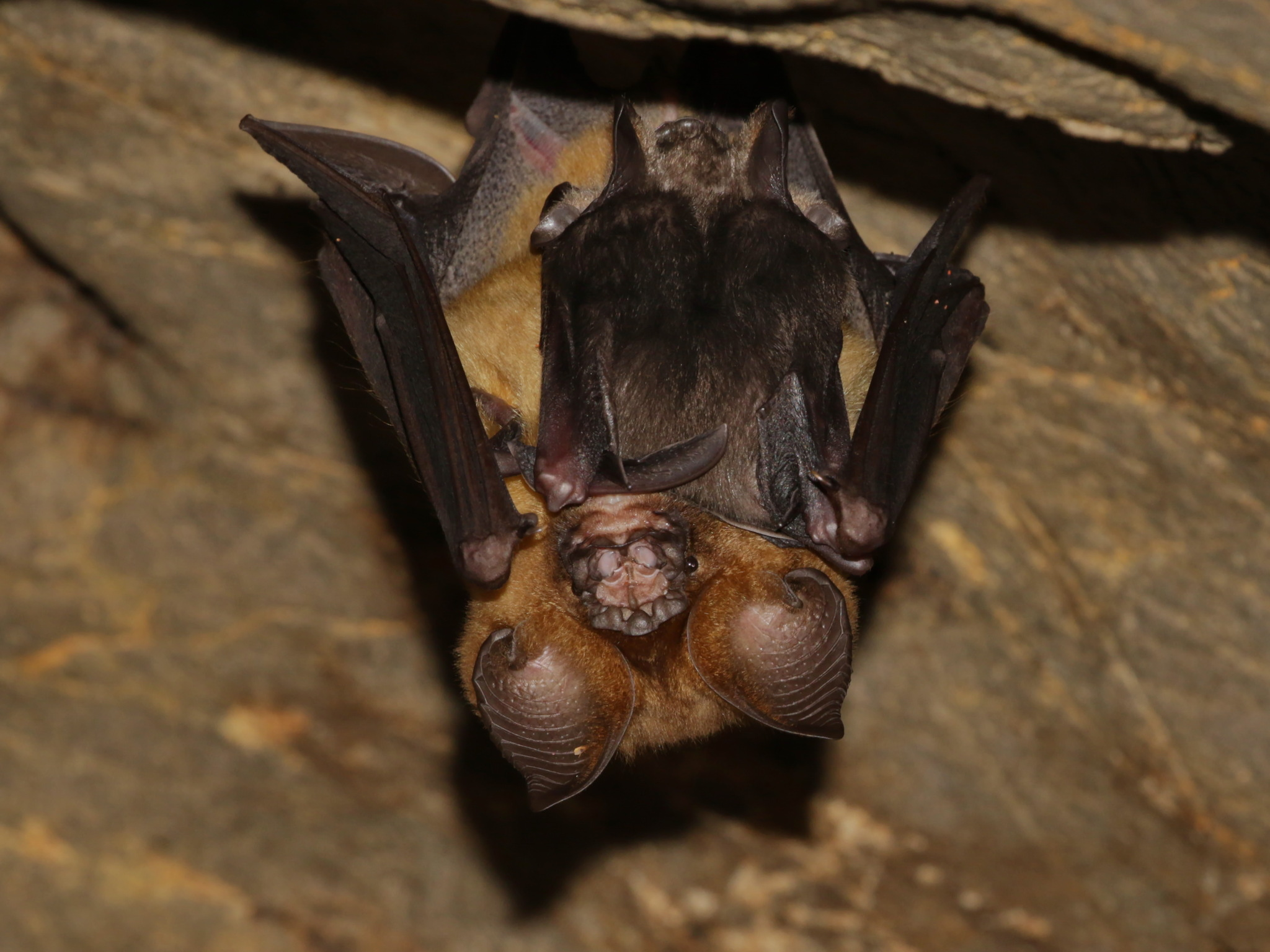

Conservation status
- Near Threatened (IUCN 3.1)

Scientific classification
- Kingdom: Animalia
- Phylum: Chordata
- Class: Mammalia
- Order: Chiroptera
- Family: Hipposideridae
- Genus: Hipposideros
- Species: H. lekaguli

Binomial name
- Hipposideros lekaguli Thonglongya & Hill, 1974
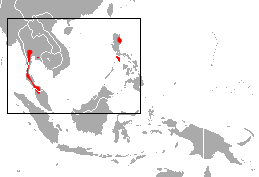
- Large Asian roundleaf bat range

= Large Asian roundleaf bat =

Species of bat

The large Asian roundleaf bat (Hipposideros lekaguli) is a species of bat in the family Hipposideridae. It is found in Malaysia, the Philippines, and Thailand. The specific name commemorates Thai zoologist and conservationist Boonsong Lekagul.

== Taxonomy and etymology ==
It was described as a new species in 1974 by Thonglongya and Hill. The holotype had been collected in the Kaeng Khoi District of Thailand in 1972 by Boonsong Lekagul. Lekagul is the eponym for the species name "lekaguli."

== Description ==
Its forearm length is 66.5–79.3 mm (2.62–3.12 in). Its ears are broad, large, and triangular. Its nose-leaf is complexly foliated with intermediate, anterior, and posterior leaflets.

== Range and habitat ==
It was first documented in Thailand in 1972. In 1992, it was additionally documented in the Philippines. It is also found in Peninsular Malaysia. It has been documented at a range of elevations from 50–400 m (160–1,310 ft).

== Conservation ==
The large Asian roundleaf bat is listed as a near-threatened species by the IUCN as of 2019. It is experiencing widespread habitat loss.
