= Trimeresurus nebularis =

Conservation status
- Vulnerable (IUCN 3.1)

Scientific classification
- Kingdom: Animalia
- Phylum: Chordata
- Class: Reptilia
- Order: Squamata
- Suborder: Serpentes
- Family: Viperidae
- Genus: Trimeresurus
- Species: T. nebularis

Binomial name
- Trimeresurus nebularis Vogel, David and Pauwels, 2004

Species of snake

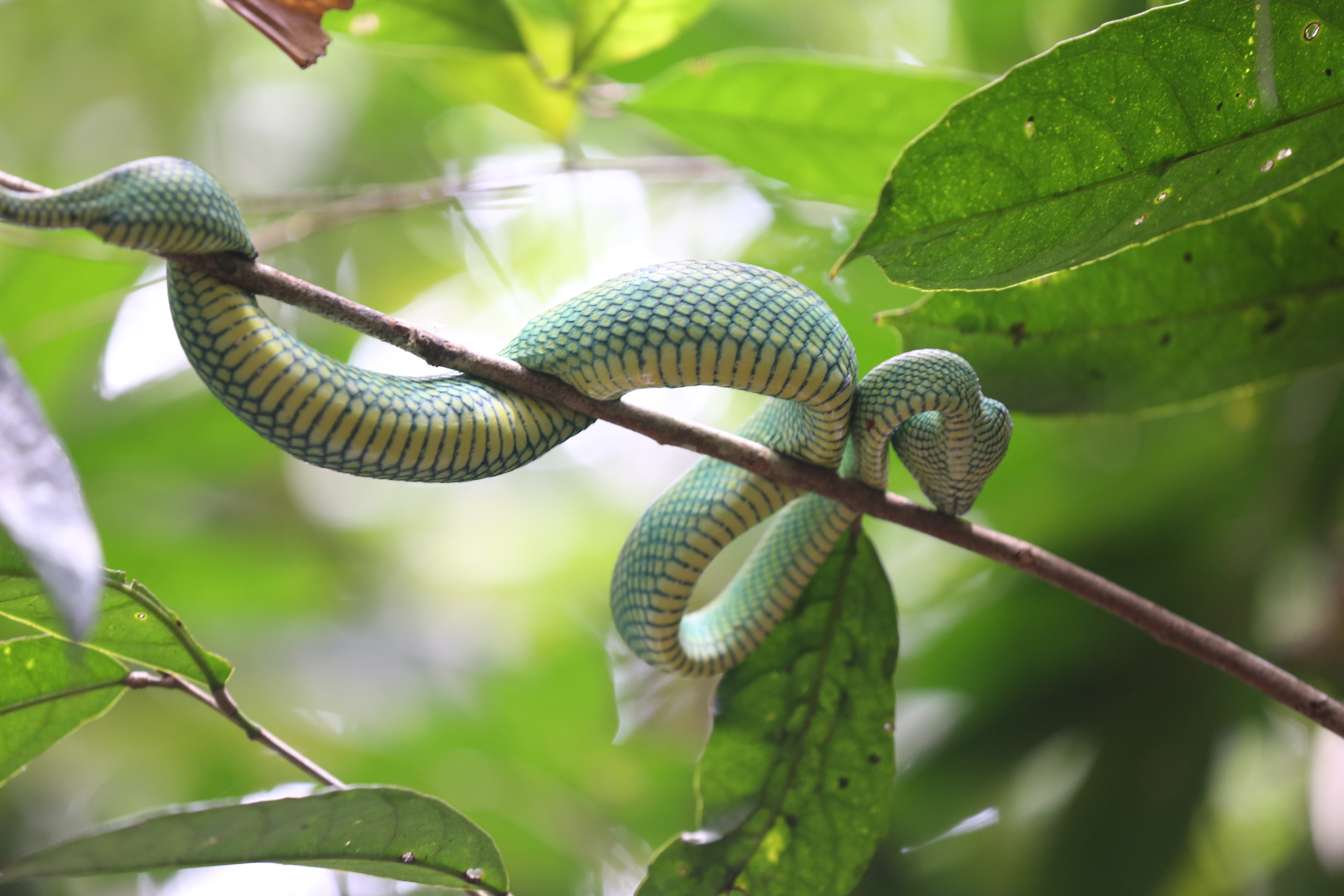

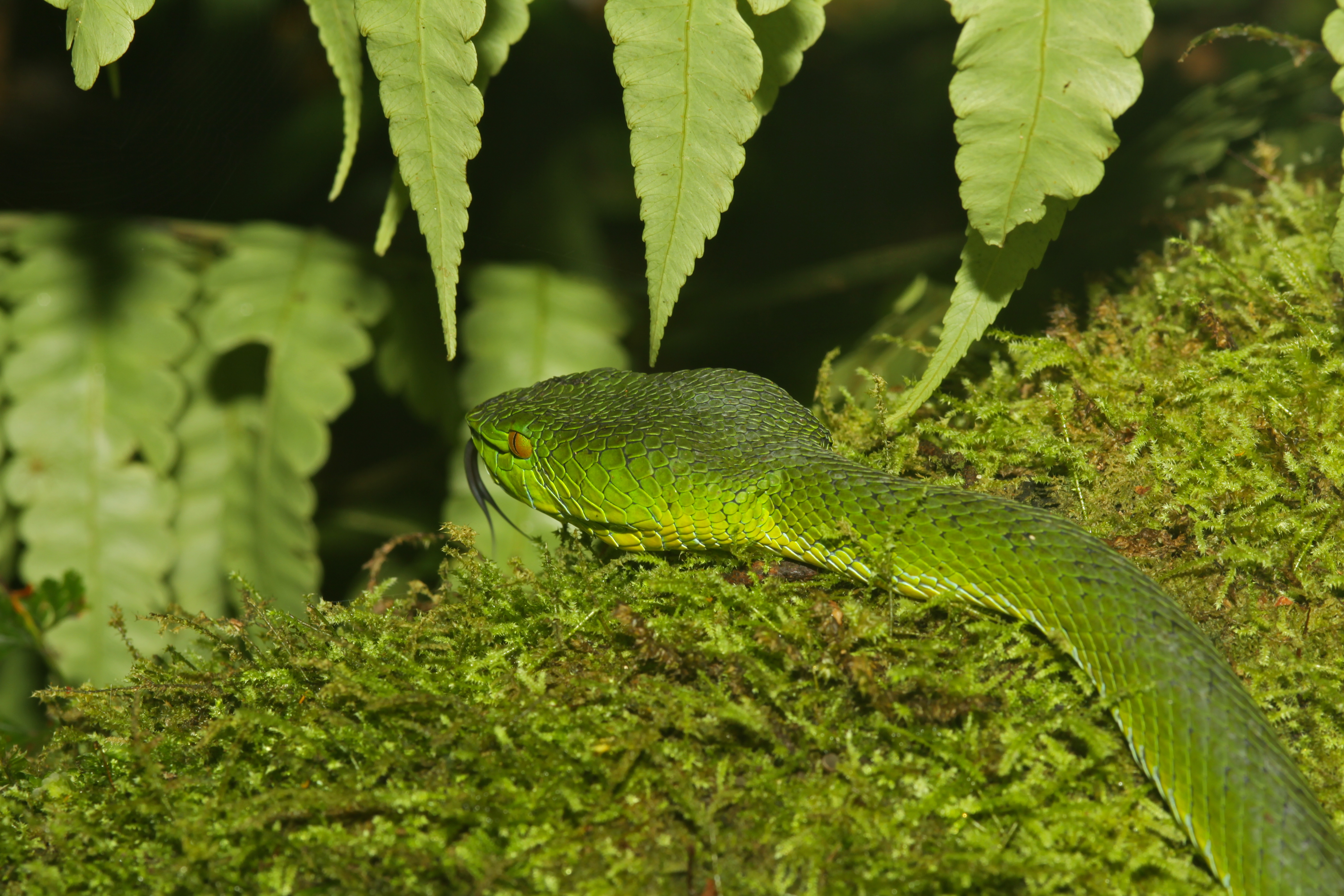

Trimeresurus nebularis (also known as the Cameron Highlands pit viper or the clouded pit viper) is a species of pit viper found in the Cameron Highlands District of west Malaysia and Thailand.

== Taxonomy ==
Trimeresurus nebularis was described in 2004. Previously, Trimeresurus from this area were considered part of Trimeresurus gramineus or Trimeresurus popeiorum. Trimeresurus nebularis is part of the subgenus Popeia.

=== Etymology ===
The name Trimeresurus nebularis comes from the Latin word nebularis which means "from the clouds". This refers to the cloud forests that the species inhabits.

== Description ==
Males can be around 100 cm (39 in) in length and females can reach around 95 cm (37 in) in total length. The body of T. nebularis is cylindrical and bright green. Males have a white or blue ventro-lateral stripe. The pupils are vertical and usually have a yellowish-green iris. Both males and females usually have blue upper lips. The scales around the throat/chin area are yellowish green while the upper scales are greenish-blue. The tail is a brown rust color on its vertebral region and has a distinct line in between. The rust color and the green lateral color makes it distinguishable from other pit vipers.

== Reproduction ==
Like other Trimeresurus, this species is ovoviviparous. Males have long hemipenes with no spines.

== Distribution and habitat ==
T. nebularis is restricted to high elevations above 1,000 m (3,300 ft). T. nebularis resides in both Thailand and Malaysia in the central part of the Titiwangsa Range in the Cameron Highlands. It has also been seen in Fraser’s Hill along with the Genting Highlands in the Pahang State in Malaysia.

== Venom ==
The venom of T. nebularis under sodium dodecyl sulfate-polyacrylamide gel electrophoresis showed a complex mixture that consisted of a wide range of proteins. Some of the proteins include metalloproteinase, C-type lectin/lectin-like proteins and serine proteases. A total of 44 proteins were identified in the venom, forty of those proteins were grouped into 9 different families of toxins. The venom can potentially cause coagulopathy if they bite a human, impairing the coagulation process of blood and causing bleeding. Although epidemiological data are absent, T. nebularis is one of the leading causes of snakebite envenomation within its range.

== Vulnerability ==
This species is listed as vulnerable by the IUCN. If threats against the animal continue, it may progress to a more severe rating on the list.
