= Lycodon gibsonae =

Scientific classification
- Kingdom: Animalia
- Phylum: Chordata
- Class: Reptilia
- Order: Squamata
- Suborder: Serpentes
- Family: Colubridae
- Genus: Lycodon
- Species: L. gibsonae

Binomial name
- Lycodon gibsonae G. Vogel & David, 2019

Species of snake

Gibson's wolf snake (Lycodon gibsonae) is a species of snake in the family colubridae. It is found in Thailand.
