= Macrocalamus schulzi =

Conservation status
- Least Concern (IUCN 3.1)

Scientific classification
- Kingdom: Animalia
- Phylum: Chordata
- Class: Reptilia
- Order: Squamata
- Suborder: Serpentes
- Family: Colubridae
- Genus: Macrocalamus
- Species: M. schulzi

Binomial name
- Macrocalamus schulzi Vogel & David, 1999

Species of snake

Macrocalamus schulzi, Schulz's reed snake, is a species of snake in the family Colubridae. The species is endemic to Malaysia.
