= Macrocalamus =

- M. chanardi

Scientific classification
- Kingdom: Animalia
- Phylum: Chordata
- Class: Reptilia
- Order: Squamata
- Suborder: Serpentes
- Family: Colubridae
- Subfamily: Calamariinae
- Genus: Macrocalamus; Günther, 1864

Genus of snakes

Macrocalamus is a genus of snakes of the family Colubridae.

== Geographic range ==
The genus Macrocalamus is endemic to the Malay Peninsula.

== Species ==
The following eight species are recognized as being valid.

- Macrocalamus chanardi David & Pauwels, 2005 – Chanard’s reed snake
- Macrocalamus emas Quah, Anuar, L. Grismer, Wood & Nor, 2019 – golden-bellied reed snake
- Macrocalamus gentingensis Yaakob & Lim, 2002 – Genting Highlands reed snake
- Macrocalamus jasoni Grandison, 1972 – Jason's reed snake, Jason's mountain reed snake
- Macrocalamus lateralis Günther, 1864 – side-blotched reed snake, Malayan mountain reed snake, striped reed snake
- Macrocalamus schulzi G. Vogel & David, 1999 – Schulz's reed snake
- Macrocalamus tweediei Lim, 1963 – Tweedie's reed snake, Tweedie's mountain reed snake
- Macrocalamus vogeli David & Pauwels, 2005 – Vogel's reed snake
