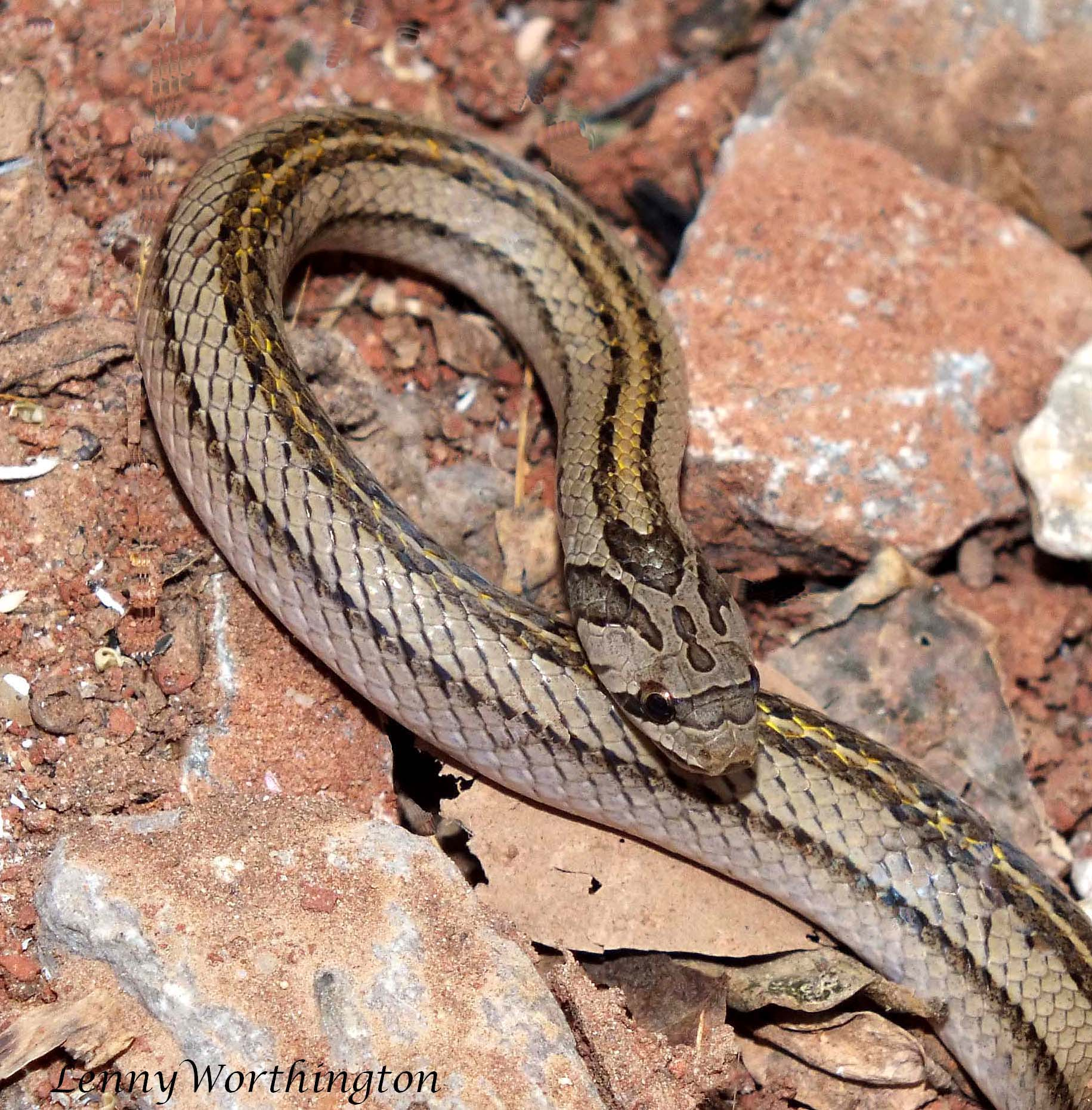

Conservation status
- Least Concern (IUCN 3.1)

Scientific classification
- Kingdom: Animalia
- Phylum: Chordata
- Class: Reptilia
- Order: Squamata
- Suborder: Serpentes
- Family: Colubridae
- Genus: Oligodon
- Species: O. taeniatus

Binomial name
- Oligodon taeniatus (Günther, 1861)

= Oligodon taeniatus =

Species of snake

The striped kukri snake (Oligodon taeniatus) is a species of snake of the family Colubridae.

== Geographic range ==
The snake is found in Thailand, Laos, Cambodia, and Vietnam.
