= Johan van Rooijen =

Dutch herpetologist and statistician

- Born: 1 September 1971
- Known for: Taxonomy of Asian snakes
- Scientific career
- Fields: Herpetology; statistics
- Workplaces: Utrecht University; Statistics Netherlands; Naturalis Biodiversity Center

Johan van Rooijen (born 1 September 1971) is a Dutch herpetologist and statistical researcher whose scientific work focuses on snakes, particularly the taxonomy and diversity of the genera Dendrelaphis and Oligodon.

== Biography ==
Van Rooijen studied biology at Utrecht University beginning in 1993 and earned his master’s degree in 1997. Since 1998, he has worked as a statistical researcher at Statistics Netherlands in The Hague, where he focuses on social statistics.

Between 2008 and 2013, he studied project management, mathematics, and computer networking at the Open Universiteit in Heerlen.

Since January 2008, van Rooijen has been a research associate in the Department of Terrestrial Zoology at the Naturalis Biodiversity Center in Leiden, where his research concentrates on snake taxonomy and species diversity.

== Biography ==
Van Rooijen is the author or co-author of numerous snake species descriptions, primarily within the genus Dendrelaphis, including:

- Dendrelaphis haasi (2008)
- Dendrelaphis grismeri, Dendrelaphis kopsteini, Dendrelaphis marenae, Dendrelaphis walli, Dendrelaphis girii, and Dendrelaphis ashoki (2007–2011)
- Dendrelaphis levitoni (2012)

He also co-described several species of the genus Oligodon, including Oligodon deuvei, Oligodon moricei, and Oligodon pseudotaeniatus.

== Selected publications ==
- Van Rooijen, J.; Scheele, D.; van Gaalen, R. (2008). Werk en inkomsten na massaontslag: de zekerheid is niet van de baan. Statistics Netherlands, Amsterdam University Press.
