= List of species native to Thailand =

The wildlife of Thailand includes its flora and fauna and their natural habitats.

== Fauna ==
=== Mammals ===
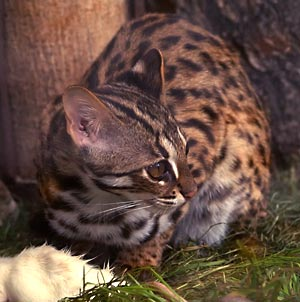
A leopard cat

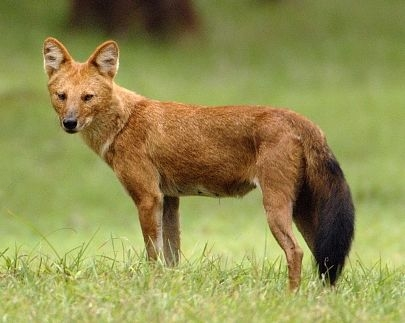
A dhole, an Asiatic wild dog

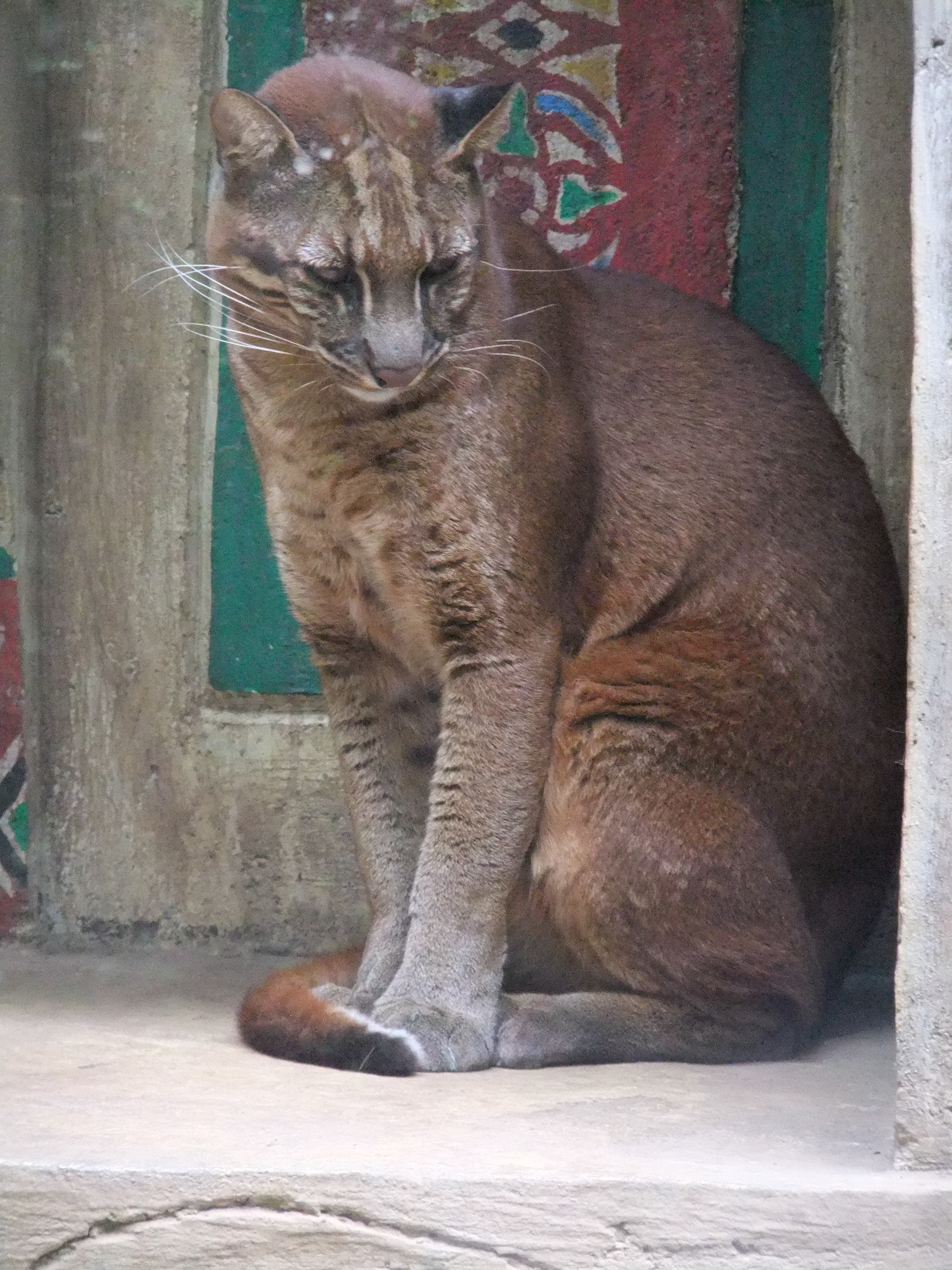
An Asiatic golden cat

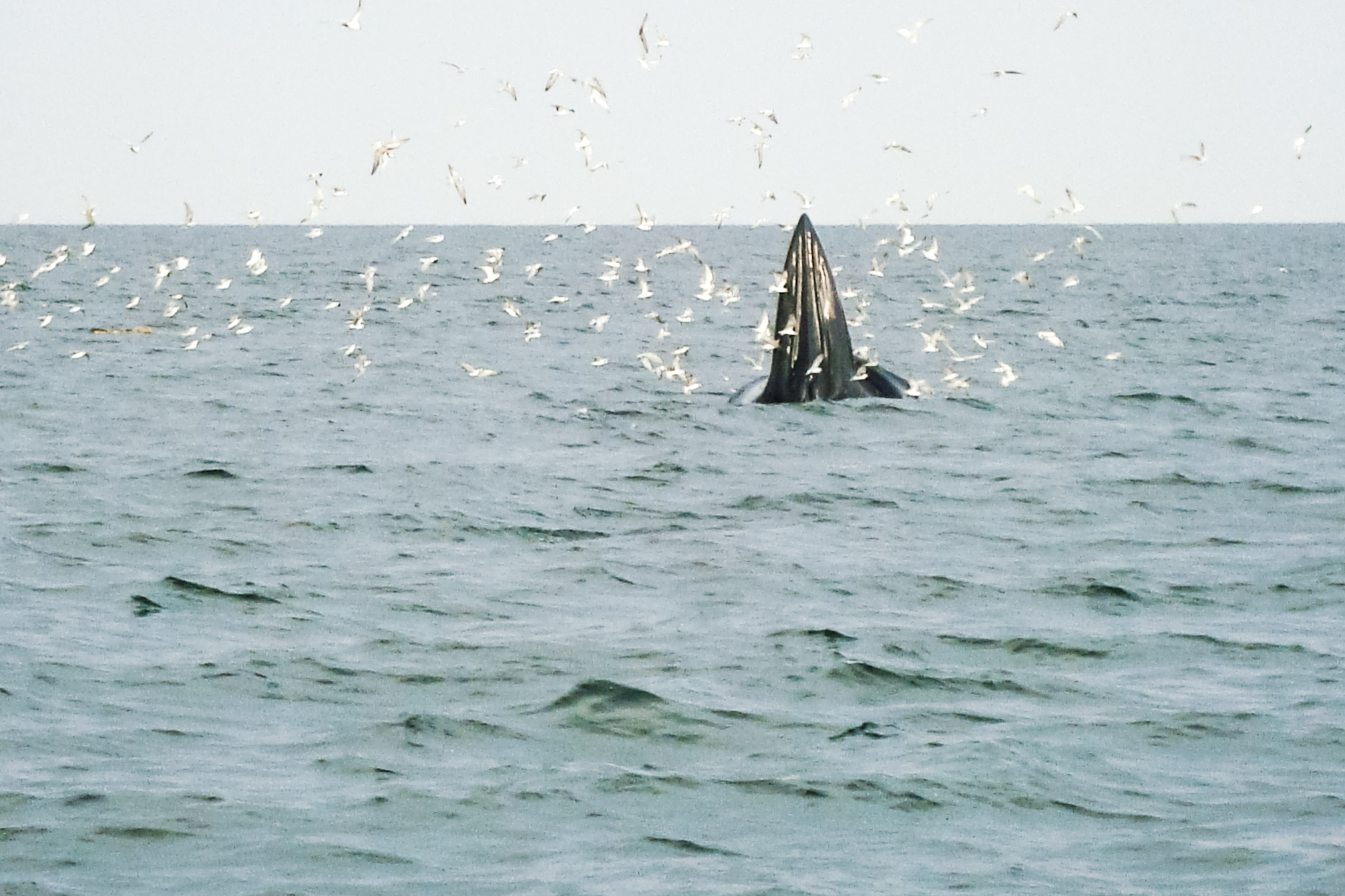
Bryde's whale in the Gulf of Thailand

There are 264 mammal species in Thailand on the IUCN Red List. Of these species, three are critically endangered, 24 are vulnerable, and two are near-threatened. One of the species listed for Thailand is considered to be extinct.

- Agile gibbon
- Asian golden cat
- Asiatic black bear
- Back-striped weasel
- Banded linsang
- Banded palm civet
- Banteng
- Binturong
- Bumblebee bat
- Clouded leopard
- Colugo
- Common dolphin
- Common treeshrew
- Crab-eating mongoose
- Cuvier's beaked whale
- Dwarf sperm whale
- European otter
- False killer whale
- Fea's muntjac
- Finless porpoise
- Fishing cat
- Flat-headed cat
- Fraser's dolphin
- Gaur
- Ginkgo-toothed beaked whale
- Gray goral
- Hairy-nosed otter
- Hog badger
- Hog deer
- Humpback dolphin
- Indian elephant
- Indian muntjac
- Indochinese leopard
- Indochinese tiger
- Irrawaddy dolphin
- Jungle cat
- Kouprey
- Lar gibbon
- Large Indian civet
- Large-spotted civet
- Leopard cat
- Lesser false vampire bat
- Malayan tapir
- Malayan tiger
- Marbled cat
- Masked palm civet
- Melon-headed whale
- Northern short-tailed gymnure
- Northern Sumatran rhinoceros
- Northern treeshrew
- Oriental small-clawed otter
- Otter civet
- Pantropical spotted dolphin
- Pileated gibbon
- Pilot whale
- Pteropus
- Pygmy killer whale
- Pygmy sperm whale
- Rice-field rat
- Rough-toothed dolphin
- Sambar deer
- Schomburgk's deer
- Siamang
- Siamese jackal
- Siberian weasel
- Small Asian mongoose
- Small Indian civet
- Small-toothed palm civet
- Spinner dolphin
- Spotted linsang
- Spotted-winged fruit bat
- Striped dolphin
- Sun bear
- Sunda pangolin
- Ussuri dhole
- Vietnamese Javan rhinoceros
- Water buffalo

=== Fish ===
Fish of Thailand

- Asian arowana
- Blackline rasbora
- Channa lucius
- Channa striata
- Climbing gourami
- Croaking gourami
- Devario laoensis
- Dwarf gourami
- Fire bar danio
- Fiveband barb
- Giant barb
- Giant freshwater stingray
- Giant gourami
- Harlequin rasbora
- Himantura kittipong
- Kissing gourami
- Pearl gourami
- Penang betta
- Puntius partipentazona
- Pygmy gourami
- Red-tailed black shark
- Siamese algae eater
- Siamese fighting fish
- Six-banded tiger barb
- Spotted barb
- Three spot gourami
- Walking catfish

=== Reptiles ===
- Ashy kukri snake
- Asian forest tortoise
- Asian giant softshell turtle
- Asian giant toad
- Asian grass lizard
- Asian water monitor
- Bengal monitor
- Blood python
- Boiga dendrophila
- Boiga drapiezii
- Boiga jaspidea
- Boiga multomaculata
- Boiga nigriceps
- Brahminy blind snake
- Buff striped keelback
- Burmese python
- Calotes emma
- Cantoria violacea
- Cat-eyed water snake
- Cerberus rynchops
- Chinese water dragon
- Chrysopelea ornata
- Cnemaspis kandiana
- Cuora amboinensis
- Dendrelaphis caudolineatus
- Draco blanfordii
- Duttaphrynus melanostictus
- Elaphe porphyracea
- Elongated tortoise
- False gharial
- Fejervarya limnocharis
- Fordonia leucobalia
- Gekko smithii
- Giant Asian pond turtle
- Gonyosoma oxycephalum
- Green cat snake
- Green sea turtle
- Hawksbill turtle
- Hemidactylus brookii
- Homalopsis buccata
- House gecko
- Hydrophis klossi
- Indian python
- Indian wolf snake
- Indo-Pacific gecko
- Keeled box turtle
- King cobra
- Leatherback sea turtle
- Little file snake
- Long-nosed whip snake
- Lycodon fasciatus
- Malagasay rainbow frog
- Microhyla berdmorei
- Microhyla ornata
- Microhyla pulchra
- Monocled cobra
- Northern river terrapin
- Oligodon cyclurus
- Oligodon dorsalis
- Ptychozoon kuhli
- Ptychozoon lionotum
- Rainbow water snake
- Reticulated python
- Saltwater crocodile
- Sand snake
- Siamese crocodile (Critically endangered and on the IUCN Red List)
- Siamese leaf-toed gecko
- Smith’s litter frog
- Spiny turtle
- Spotted flying dragon
- Tokay gecko
- Trimeresurus gramineus
- Trimeresurus popeiorum
- Trimeresurus purpureomaculatus
- Trimeresurus stejnegeri
- Tropidolaemus wagleri
- White-banded wolf snake
- Yellow sea snake

=== Birds ===
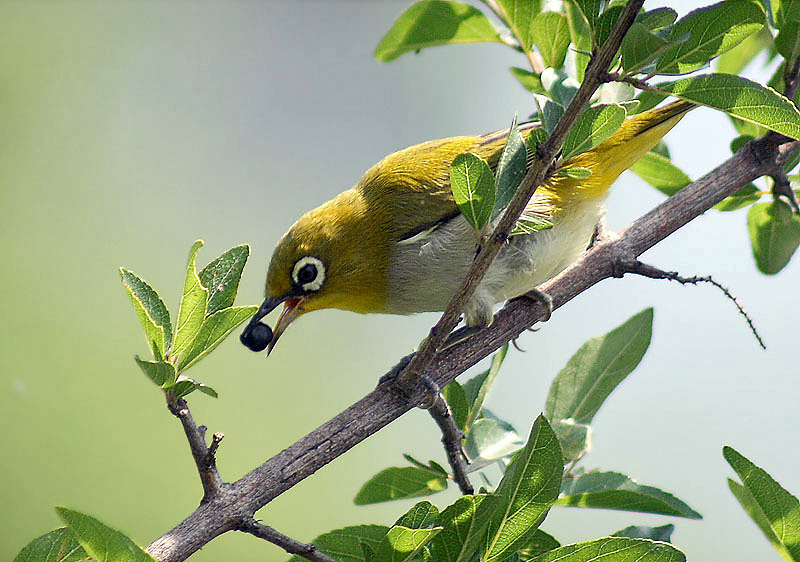
The Oriental white-eye is a very common resident of Thailand.

The birds of Thailand number nearly one thousand species, of which approximately 45 are rare or accidental. At least seven bird species previously found in Thailand have since been made locally extinct, and approximately fifty of Thailand's bird species are globally threatened.

In 1991, it was estimated that 159 resident and 23 migratory species were endangered or vulnerable due to forest clearance, illegal logging, hunting and habitat degradation, especially in the lowlands. The species most affected are large water birds whose wetland habitat has been largely lost to agriculture, and forest species, as deforestation for agriculture and logging have removed and degraded portions of the woodlands.

=== Insects ===
- Cicada

==== Butterflies ====
There are about 1,100 known butterfly species from Thailand.

- Bhutanitis lidderdalii
- Papilio clytia
- Papilio paradoxus
- Parantica aglea
- Parantica melaneus
- Tirumala limniace
- Tirumala septentrionis

=== Molluscs ===
There are at least 23 known families, 57 genera and 125 species of land gastropods from Eastern Thailand.

There are at least 8 known species of freshwater gastropods and at least 2 species of freshwater bivalves from the Sakaeo Province in the Eastern Thailand.

== Flora ==
- Flora of Thailand
- Garden angelica
- Luculia gratissima
- Meconopsis villosa
- Persicaria affinis
- Ruellia capitata

== See also ==
- Wildlife of Phitsanulok Province
- Environmental issues in Thailand
