= Betta siamorientalis =

Scientific classification
- Kingdom: Animalia
- Phylum: Chordata
- Class: Actinopterygii
- Order: Anabantiformes
- Family: Osphronemidae
- Genus: Betta
- Species: B. siamorientalis

Binomial name
- Betta siamorientalis Kowasupat, Panijpan, Ruenwongsa & Jeenthong, 2012

Species of fish

Betta siamorientalis is a species of gourami in genus Betta. It is a freshwater fish native to Asia, where it occurs in shallow marshes, grass fields, and paddy fields in some provinces in eastern Thailand (Chacheongsao, Sa Kaeo, Prachin Buri, some part of Chon Buri) and Cambodia and southern Vietnam. It is typically found in still, vegetated environments at the water's edge and is known to use aquatic plants as shelter for building and guarding bubble nests. It is known to occur alongside the species Anabas testudineus, Lepidocephalichthys hasselti, Macrognathus siamensis, Monopterus albus, Pangio anguillaris, Trichopodus trichopterus, Trichopsis pumila, Trichopsis schalleri, and Trichopsis vittata. The species reaches 3.6 cm (1.4 inches) in standard length and is known to be a facultative air-breather.

Betta siamorientalis was described in 2012 next to Betta mahachaiensis on December in the same year by a team of biologists from Thailand led by Dr. Bhinyo Panijpan's Mahidol University research group (with PhD candidate Mr. Chanon Kowasupat) in Vertebrate Zoology journal.
