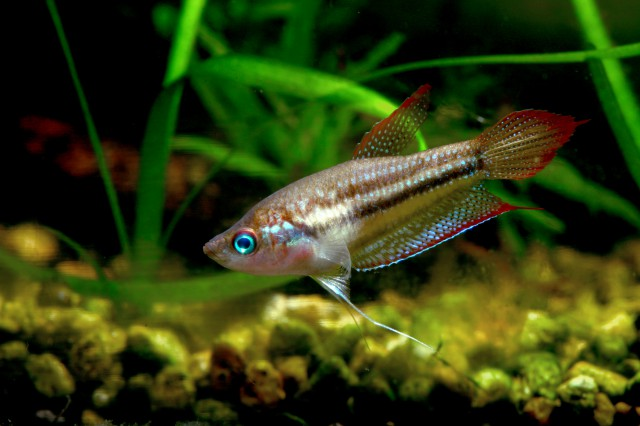

Conservation status
- Least Concern (IUCN 3.1)

Scientific classification
- Kingdom: Animalia
- Phylum: Chordata
- Class: Actinopterygii
- Order: Anabantiformes
- Family: Osphronemidae
- Genus: Trichopsis
- Species: T. schalleri

Binomial name
- Trichopsis schalleri Ladiges, 1962
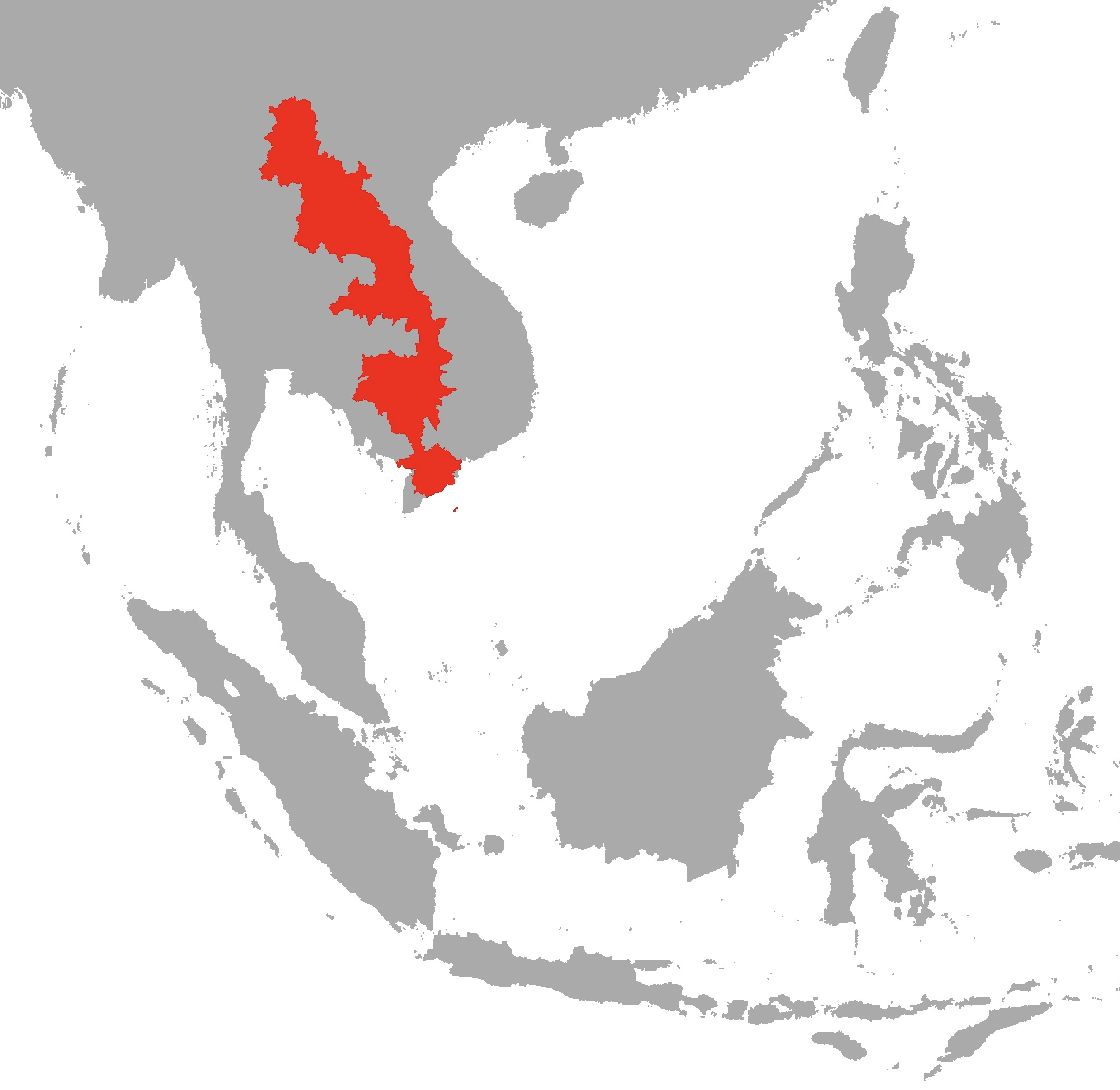

= Threestripe gourami =

Species of fish

The threestripe gourami (Trichopsis schalleri), also known as the Mekong croaking gourami, is a species of freshwater ray-finned fish from the subfamily Macropodusinae which is part of the gourami family Osphronemidae. It is native to south-east Asia.

== Description ==
The threestripe gourami normally shows one or two, almost never three, dark stripes running the length of its body but there it lacks any strip along the base of the anal fin. The elongated rear anal fin rays do not reach beyond the middle of the caudal fin which is lanceolate in shape. The dorsal, anal and caudal fin have red margins and are marked with many blue spots. Males are larger than the females and have elongated rays in the pelvic, dorsal, anal, and caudal fins. It can attain a length of 4 centimetres (1.6 in) with the largest males measured at 5 centimetres (2.0 in). It is intermediate in size between its congeners, being smaller than the croaking gourami (Trichopsis vittata) and larger than the pygmy gourami (T. pumila).

== Distribution ==
The threestripe gourami is found throughout the Mekong basin from Laos, through Thailand and Cambodia, including the Tonle Sap to the Mekong Delta in Vietnam. In Thailand it is also found throughoutin the Chao Praya river system.

== Habitat and biology ==
The threestripe gourami occurs in still to slow-moving, lowland waters. It can be found in a variety of habitats among which are swamp forest, peat swamps, floodplains, river tributaries, irrigation canals, paddy fields, and roadside ditches. It appears to prefer very slow flowing or still waters where there is a dense growth of aquatic vegetation or thick plant cover along the shores.

The breeding male creates a bubblenest among floating plants and when that is complete he will display to the female. When the female is ready to mate she will move to directly beneath the bubblenestand the male will wrap his body around hers. As she spawns the male simultaneously fertilises the eggs. The female normally produces about ten eggs per mating and after fertilisation these float up into the bubblenest with any stray eggs being collected by the male and placed in the nest. Spawning may be repeated several times until the female runs out of eggs. After spawning is complete the male guards the nest, the eggs usually hatching after 48 hours.

The species in the genus Trichopsis make audible sounds using a specialised pectoral mechanism which is unique within the gouramis. The structure is made up of modified tendons of the pectoral fin with muscles which are stretched and plucked by the bottom of the front fin rays of the pectoral fin in like the strings of a guitar. Each pectoral fin can be beaten in turn, and can produce short or long bursts of sound which are produced by both sexes. Sound is mainly produced when the fish are interacting antagonistically or courting. Each species of Trichopsis has its own patterns of producing sounds. These fishes may be able to settle antagonistic interactions as they can use the sounds produced to assess the condition and fitness of nearby fishes. Females produce a 'purring' sounds when initiating spawning, and in this aspect they are unique among fishes.

== Species description and etymology ==
The threestripe gourami was formally described in 1962 by Werner Ladiges. The type locality is given as Nam-Mun at Korat, 135 miles northeast of Bangkok. The species was first discovered and imported to Europe by the German aquarist Dietrich Schaller, who is honoured with its specific name.

== Human use ==
The threestripe gourami is uncommon in the aquarium trade and is said to be infrequently available. Live specimens taken from the wild are normally used for breeding to provide fish for the aquarium trade. It is discarded if caught among foodfish.
