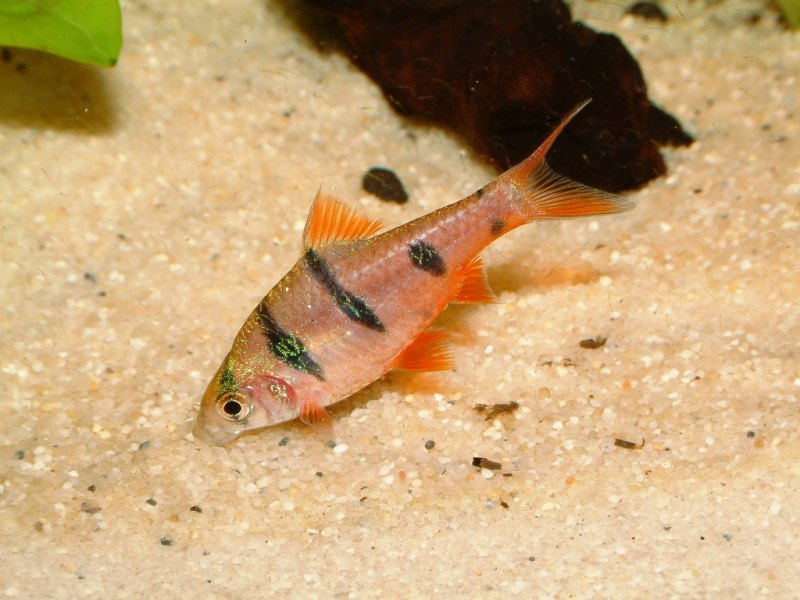
- Six-banded tiger barb, Desmopuntius hexazona

Scientific classification
- Kingdom: Animalia
- Phylum: Chordata
- Class: Actinopterygii
- Order: Cypriniformes
- Family: Cyprinidae
- Subfamily: Smiliogastrinae
- Genus: Desmopuntius; Kottelat, 2013

Type species
- Barbus hexazona M. C. W. Weber & de Beaufort, 1912

Species
- See list

= Desmopuntius =

Genus of fishes

Desmopuntius is a genus of small freshwater cyprinids native to Southeast Asia. They were formerly included in Puntius.

== Etymology ==
The name Desmopuntius is derived from the Greek language δεσμψτης ("desmotes") meaning 'prisoner' and genus name "Puntius", a reference to the striped outfits commonly attributed to prison wear.

== Species ==
According to FishBase, there are currently eight recognized species in this genus. Another species recognized as Systomus endecanalis by FishBase is placed in the genus Desmopuntius by Catalog of Fishes, following a taxonomic review by Maurice Kottelat in 2013.

- Desmopuntius endecanalis (T. R. Roberts, 1989)
- Desmopuntius foerschi (Kottelat, 1982)
- Desmopuntius gemellus (Kottelat, 1996)
- Desmopuntius hexazona (M. C. W. Weber & de Beaufort, 1912) (Six-banded tiger barb)
- Desmopuntius johorensis (Duncker, 1904) (Striped barb)
- Desmopuntius mahakamensis (Harefa, 2025) (Mahakam striped barb)
- Desmopuntius pentazona (Boulenger, 1894) (Fiveband barb)
- Desmopuntius rhomboocellatus (Koumans, 1940) (Snakeskin barb)
- Desmopuntius trifasciatus (Kottelat, 1996)
