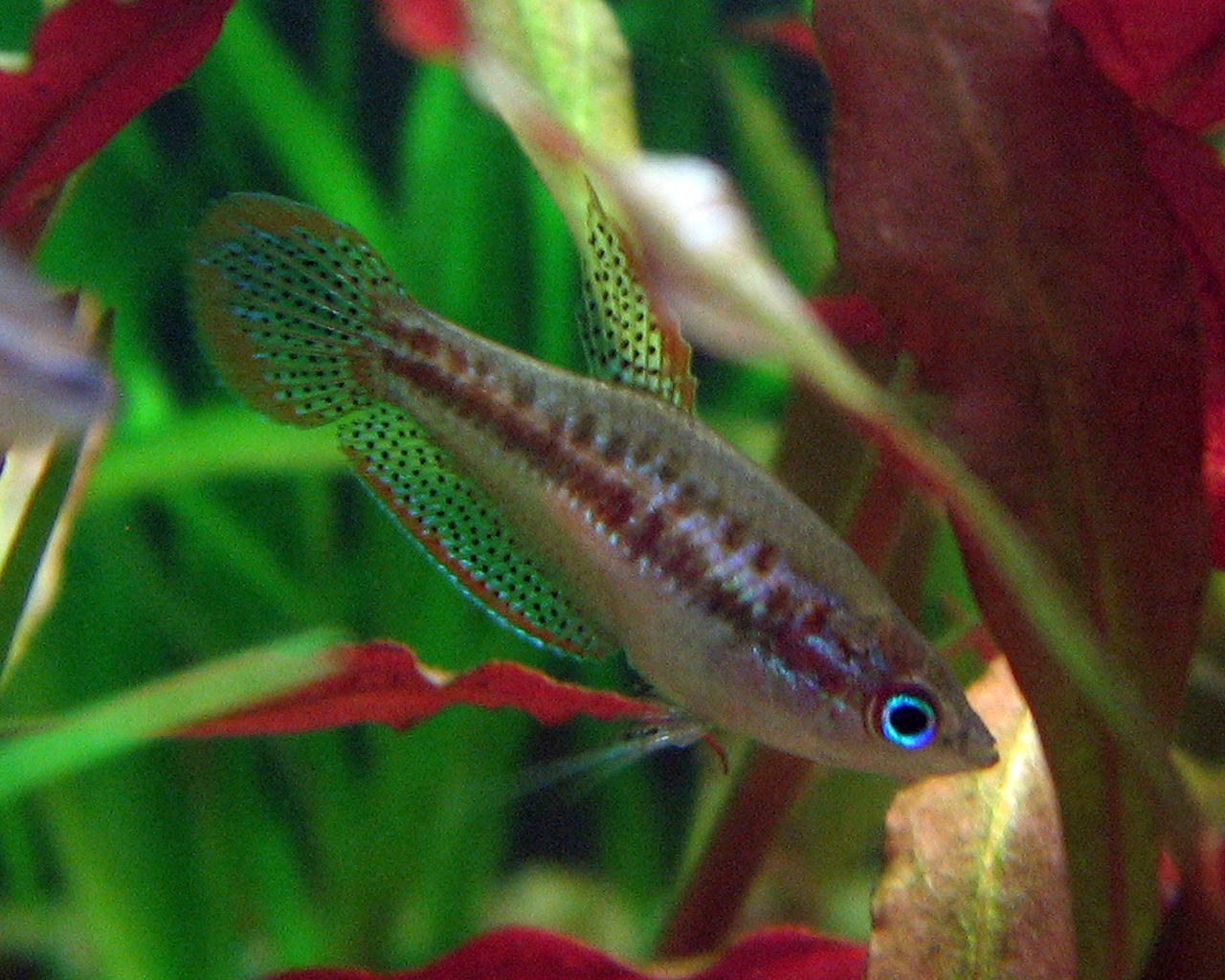
- Pygmy gourami (T. pumila)

Scientific classification
- Domain: Eukaryota
- Kingdom: Animalia
- Phylum: Chordata
- Class: Actinopterygii
- Order: Anabantiformes
- Family: Osphronemidae
- Subfamily: Macropodusinae
- Genus: Trichopsis; Canestrini, 1860

Type species
- Trichopus striatus Bleeker, 1850
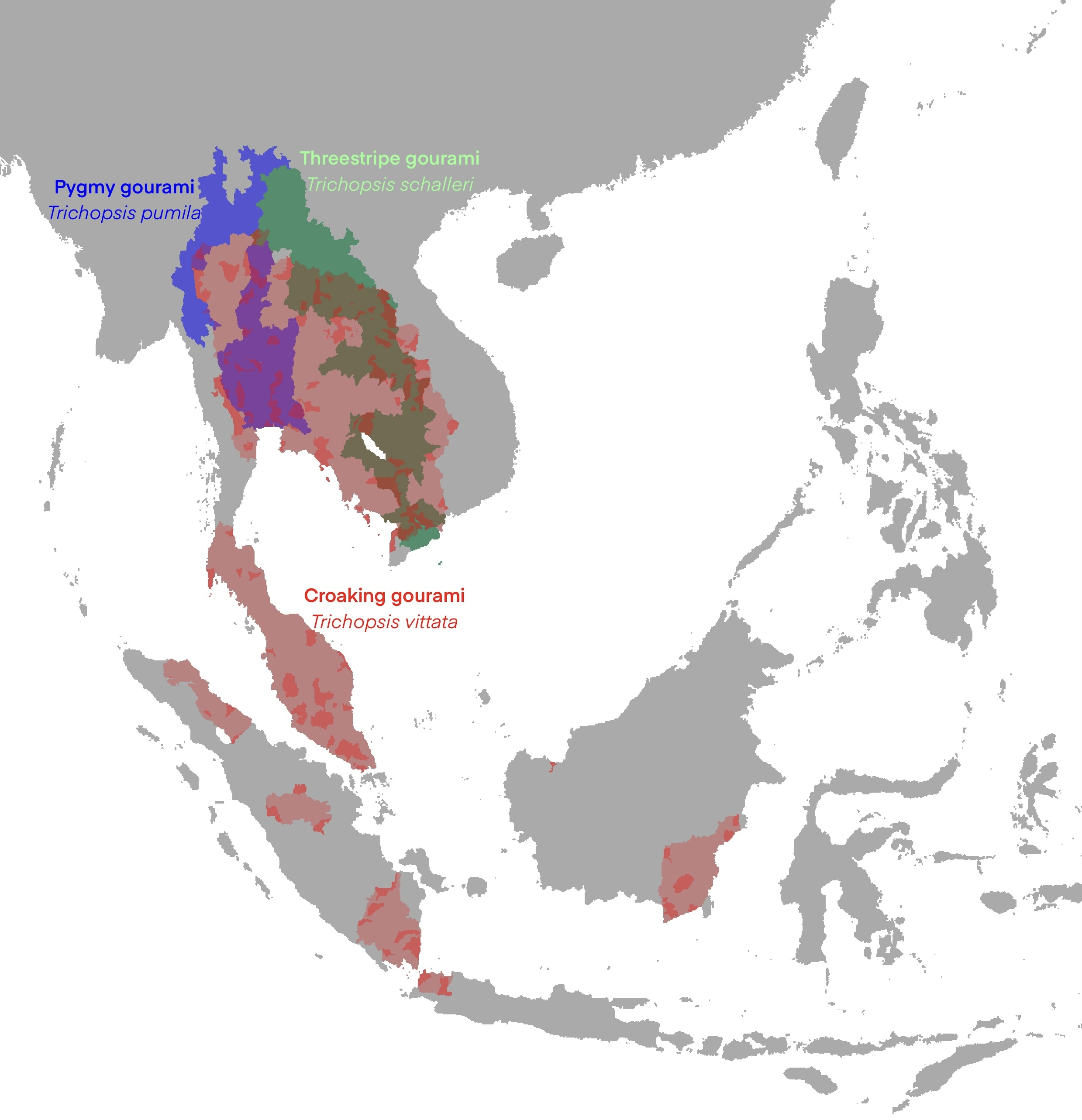

= Trichopsis =

Genus of fishes

Trichopsis is a genus of gouramies native to Southeast Asia.

== Species ==
There are currently three recognized species in this genus:

- Trichopsis pumila (J. P. Arnold, 1936) (Pygmy gourami)
- Trichopsis schalleri Ladiges, 1962 (Threestripe gourami)
- Trichopsis vittata (G. Cuvier, 1831) (Croaking gourami)

== Relation to humans ==
Gouramis of the genus Trichopsis are very popular in the aquarium trade.
