= Desmopuntius trifasciatus =

Scientific classification
- Domain: Eukaryota
- Kingdom: Animalia
- Phylum: Chordata
- Class: Actinopterygii
- Order: Cypriniformes
- Family: Cyprinidae
- Subfamily: Smiliogastrinae
- Genus: Desmopuntius
- Species: D. trifasciatus

Binomial name
- Desmopuntius trifasciatus (Kottelat, 1996)

Synonyms
- Puntius trifasciatus Kottelat, 1996

Species of fish

Desmopuntius trifasciatus is a species of cyprinid fish endemic to Indonesia where it can be found in dark, slowly flowing blackwater rivers. This species can reach a length of 9.6 centimetres (3.8 in) SL.
