= Desmopuntius gemellus =

Scientific classification
- Kingdom: Animalia
- Phylum: Chordata
- Class: Actinopterygii
- Order: Cypriniformes
- Family: Cyprinidae
- Subfamily: Smiliogastrinae
- Genus: Desmopuntius
- Species: D. gemellus

Binomial name
- Desmopuntius gemellus (Kottelat, 1996)

Synonyms
- Puntius gemellus Kottelat, 1996

Species of fish

Desmopuntius gemellus is a species of cyprinid fish endemic to Sumatra. This species can reach a length of 6.5 centimetres (2.6 in) SL.
