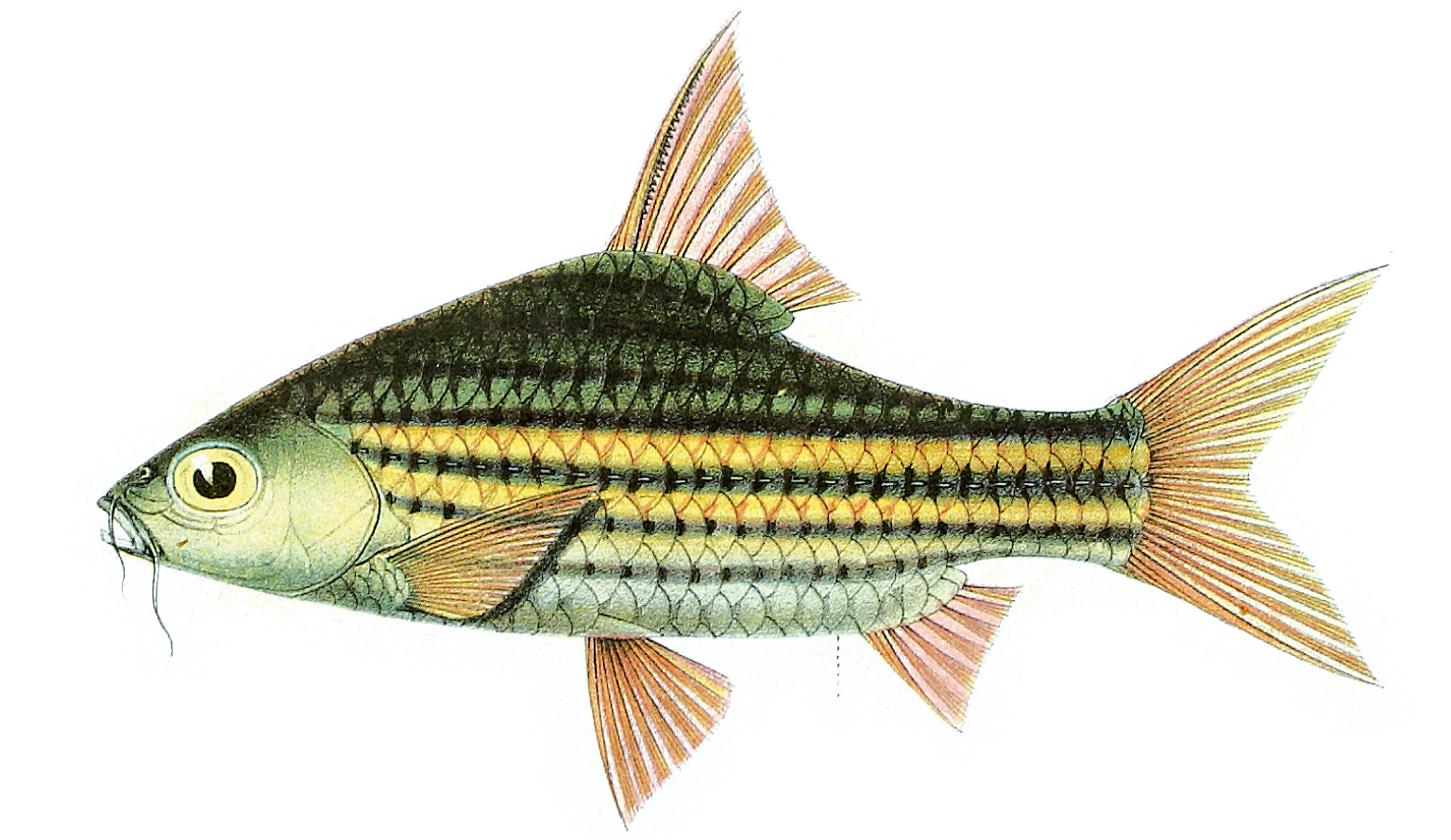

Scientific classification
- Kingdom: Animalia
- Phylum: Chordata
- Class: Actinopterygii
- Order: Cypriniformes
- Family: Cyprinidae
- Subfamily: Smiliogastrinae
- Genus: Desmopuntius
- Species: D. johorensis

Binomial name
- Desmopuntius johorensis (Duncker, 1904)

Synonyms
- Barbus tetrazona johorensis Duncker, 1904; Puntius johorensis (Duncker, 1904); Systomus johorensis (Duncker, 1904); Barbus fasciatus Bleeker, 1853; Puntius fasciatus (Bleeker, 1853); Puntius eugrammus Silas, 1956; Barbus eugrammus (Silas, 1956)

= Striped barb =

Species of fish

The striped barb (Desmopuntius johorensis), is a species of cyprinid fish Cyprinidae native to the Malay Peninsula, Borneo, and Sumatra where it is found in the shallows of rivers, streams and ditches. This species can reach a length of 12 centimetres (4.7 in) TL. It is commercially important to local fisheries and can also be found in the aquarium trade.
