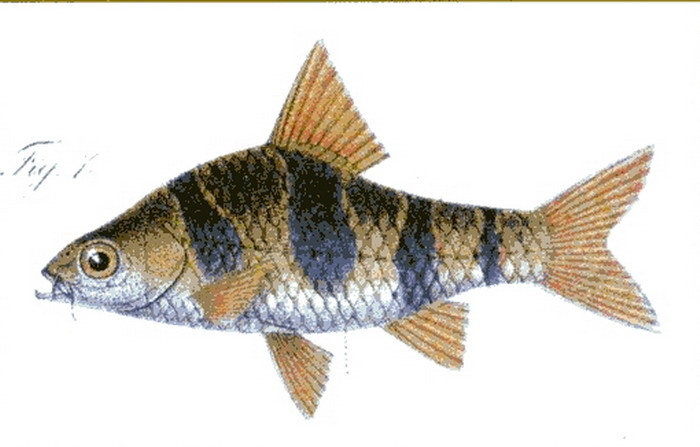

Scientific classification
- Domain: Eukaryota
- Kingdom: Animalia
- Phylum: Chordata
- Class: Actinopterygii
- Order: Cypriniformes
- Family: Cyprinidae
- Subfamily: Smiliogastrinae
- Genus: Desmopuntius
- Species: D. rhomboocellatus

Binomial name
- Desmopuntius rhomboocellatus (Koumans, 1940)

Synonyms
- Puntius rhomboocellatus Koumans, 1940; Barbus rhomboocellatus (Koumans, 1940); Systomus rhomboocellatus (Koumans, 1940); Barbus tetrazona Bleeker, 1856 (ambiguous name); Barbus kahajani Hoedeman, 1956

= Desmopuntius rhomboocellatus =

Species of fish

Desmopuntius rhomboocellatus, the snakeskin barb, is a species of cyprinid fish endemic to Borneo where it is found in western and central Kalimantan. This species reaches a length of 8.8 centimetres (3.5 in) TL. The specific rhomboocellatus refers to the rhomboid ocellus markings of the flanks, which sometimes gives rise to the common name "Snakeskin barb".
