= Wildlife of Phitsanulok province =

Flora and fauna of Phitsanulok Province

The Phitsanulok Province of Thailand is home to a plethora of animal and plant species, including a number of endangered, vulnerable and near threatened species. Indigenous animal species include a variety of mammals (including endangered tigers and the vulnerable Asiatic black bear), crabs, reptiles, amphibians, fish, insects, and over 190 species of birds.

Indigenous plant life include numerous species of flowering plants including the endangered phayom, Hopea ferrea and Dalbergia oliveri, the vulnerable Hopea odorata and Pinus latteri, and a variety of conifers and clubmosses. Near threatened birds include the Siamese fireback and Oriental darter. The Siamese fireback has been nominated to be the national bird of Thailand.

Wildlife conservation is just beginning to be realized in the province. Plans for sustainable development are being implemented, and over the last 30 years, more and more land has been set aside as protected areas. The protected areas in Phitsanulok include the province's five national parks.

== Animals ==
=== Mammals ===
Phitsanulok Province is the native habitat of a great number of mammals, including canines, felines, weasels, bears, civets, rodents, ungulates, elephants, monkeys, rabbits and hare. Included in the list of species is the endangered tiger and the vulnerable Asiatic black bear. A representative sampling of the province's mammals is as follows:

==== Canines ====
Order: Carnivora Family: Canidae

Wild canines of Phitsanulok Province include species of fox.

==== Felines ====
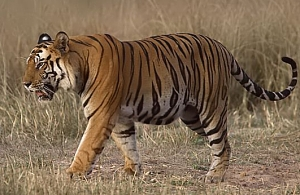
Tiger

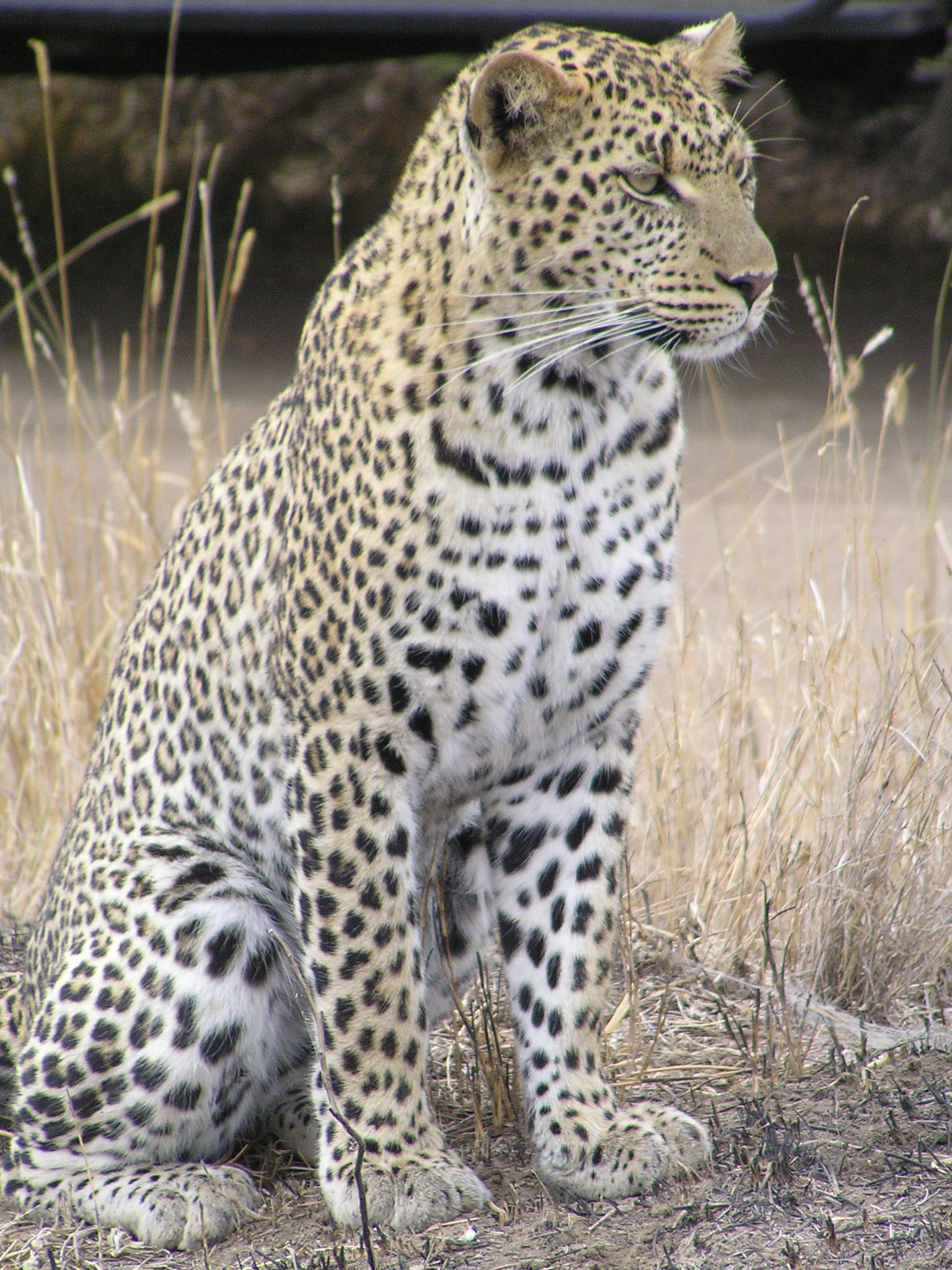
Leopard

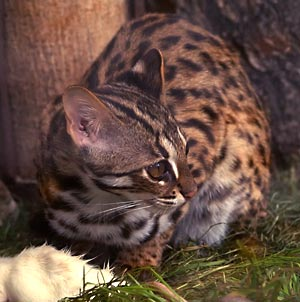
Leopard cat

Order: Carnivora Family: Felidae

There are 41 known species of felines in the world today which have all descended from a common ancestor about 10.8 million years ago. This taxa originated in Asia and spread across continents by crossing land bridges. The following feline species are reported by the Department of National Parks to be living in the wild in Phitsanulok Province:

- Tiger (Panthera tigris)
- Leopard (Panthera pardus)
- Leopard cat (Prionailurus bengalensis)

Of these three cats, the tiger is the only endangered species. The primary reason for the steady population decline of the tiger is human activity. Tigers are threatened by illegal trade of their skins and the destruction of forests. For years, it has been claimed that there are about 500 wild tigers in Thailand. Recent studies, however, indicate that the number is closer to 150. To make things worse, in Burma, hunting tigers in the wild is still legal.

==== Weasels ====
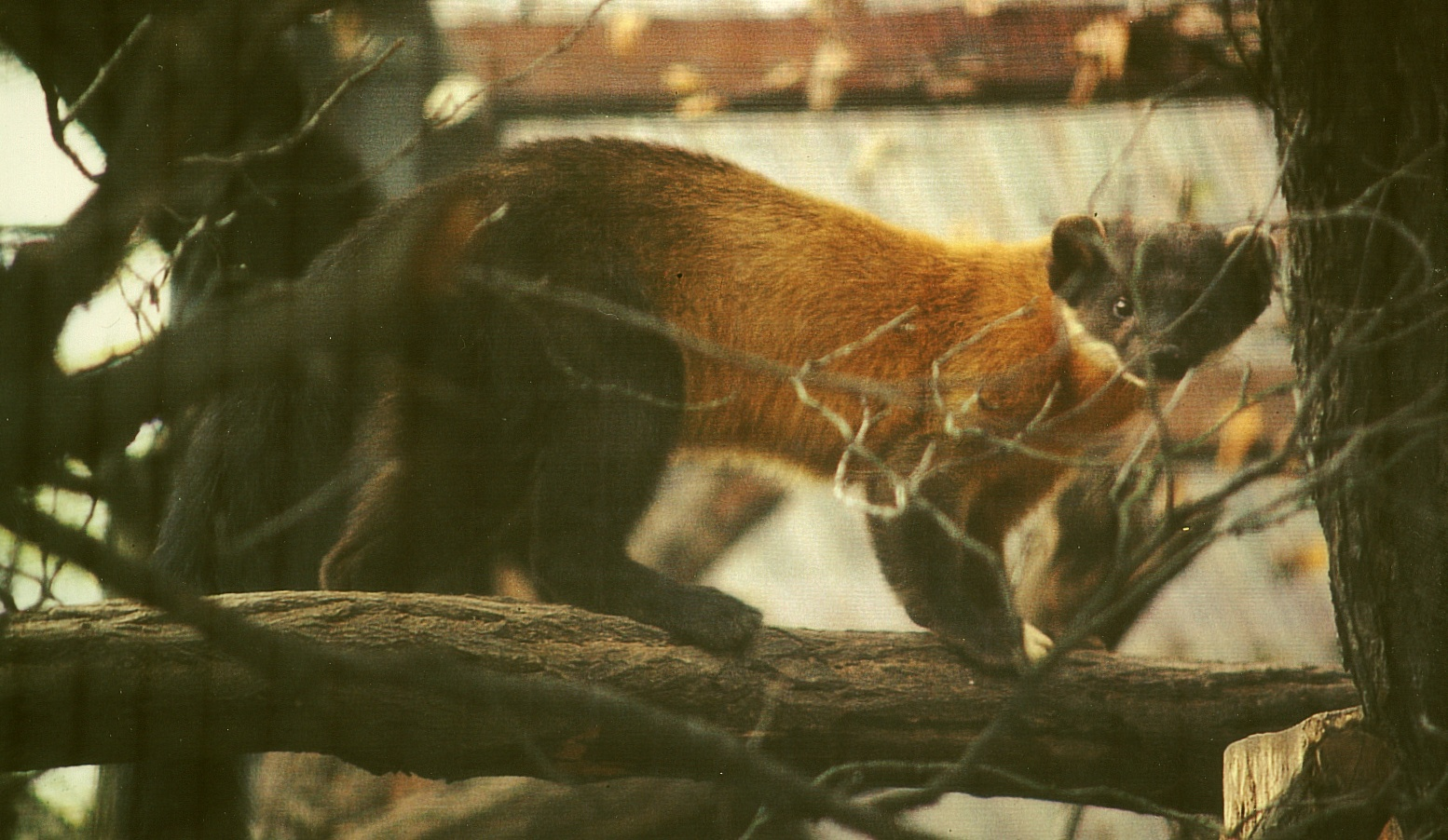
Yellow-throated marten

Order: Carnivora Family: Mustelidae

Weasels are typically small animals with short legs, short round ears, and thick fur. Some mustelids have exquisite furs which have been valuable for many centuries—the mink, the sable (a type of marten) and the ermine (stoat) are all members of the family. This has led to the hunting of these animals, especially in the past. The following weasels are reported by the Department of National Parks to be living in the wild in Phitsanulok Province:

- Yellow-throated marten (Martes flavigula)

==== Bears ====
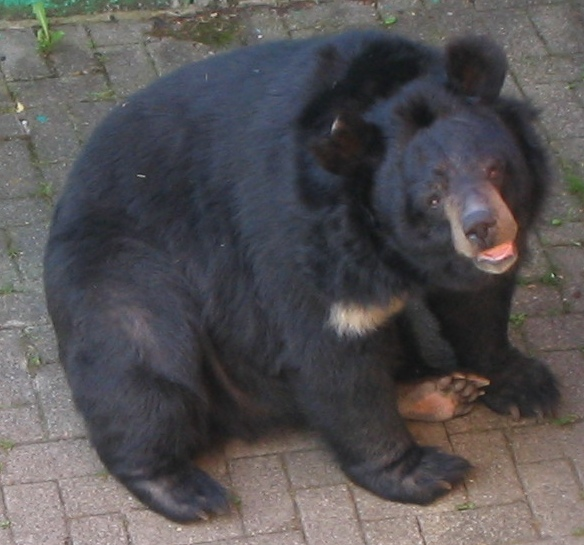
Asiatic bear

Order: Carnivora Family: Ursidae

Although there are only eight living species of bear, they are widespread, appearing in a wide variety of habitats throughout the Northern Hemisphere and partially in the Southern Hemisphere. Common characteristics of modern bears include a large body with stocky legs, a long snout, shaggy hair, paws with five nonretractile claws, and a short tail. The Department of National Parks reports that there are Asiatic black bears (Ursus thibetanus) living in the wild in Phitsanulok Province. This bear species has been classified as a vulnerable species, meaning likely to become endangered unless the circumstances threatening its survival and reproduction improve.

==== Civets and allies ====
Order: Carnivora Family: Viverridae

The family Viverridae is made up of 35 species, including all of the genets, the binturong, most of the civets, and the four linsangs. Favoured habitats include woodland, savanna, mountains and, above all, tropical rainforest. In consequence, many are faced with severe loss of habitat. The following Viverridae are reported by the Department of National Parks to be living in the wild in Phitsanulok Province:

- Masked palm civet (Paguma larvata)

==== Rodents ====
- Squirrel
- Chipmunk
- Porcupine
- Rat

==== Ungulates ====
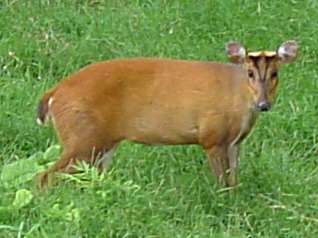
Indian barking deer

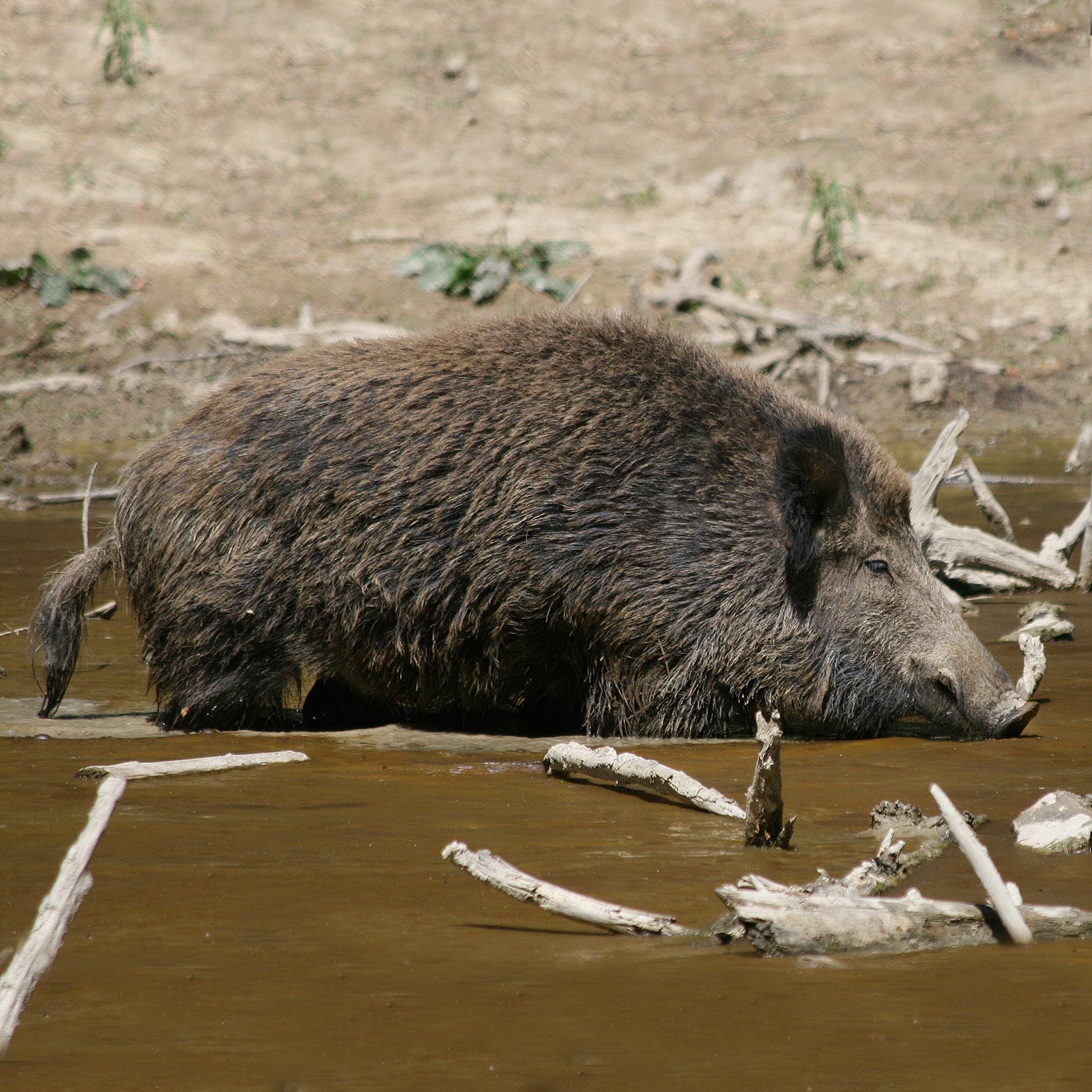
Wild boar

- Indian barking deer (Muntiacus muntjak)
- Mouse deer
- Wild boar (Sus scrofa)

==== Other mammals ====
- Elephant
- Colobine monkeys
- Rabbit
- Hare

=== Birds ===
According to the Department of National Parks, over 190 species of birds have been observed in Phitsanulok Province, including the near threatened Siamese fireback and Oriental darter. Of those 190 species (not individually named in the Department's literature), the ones which have been identified in the published journal of Thailand Bird Reports (covering the years 1997-2007) are listed as follows:

==== Swifts ====
Order: Apodiformes Family: Apodidae

Swifts are small birds which spend the majority of their lives flying. These birds have very short legs and never settle voluntarily on the ground, perching instead only on vertical surfaces. Many swifts have long swept-back wings which resemble a crescent or boomerang. There are 98 species worldwide and 14 species which occur in Thailand. Presence of swifts in Phitsanulok Province is confirmed by the Department of National Parks, but specific genera and species are not provided.

==== Plovers and lapwings ====
Order: Charadriiformes Family: Charadriidae

The family Charadriidae includes the plovers, dotterels and lapwings. They are small to medium-sized birds with compact bodies, short, thick necks and long, usually pointed, wings. They are found in open country worldwide, mostly in habitats near water. There are 66 species worldwide and 14 species which occur in Thailand. Among the lapwings sighted in Phitsanulok are:

- Grey-headed lapwing (Vanellus cinereus)

==== Sandpipers and allies ====
Order: Charadriiformes Family: Scolopacidae

Scolopacidae is a large diverse family of small to medium-sized shorebirds including the sandpipers, curlews, godwits, shanks, tattlers, woodcocks, snipes, dowitchers and phalaropes. The majority of these species eat small invertebrates picked out of the mud or soil. Variation in length of legs and bills enables multiple species to feed in the same habitat, particularly on the coast, without direct competition for food. There are 89 species worldwide and 39 species which occur in Thailand. Among the Scolopacidae sighted in Phitsanulok Province are:

- Eurasian woodcock (Scolopax rusticola)

==== Bitterns, herons and egrets ====
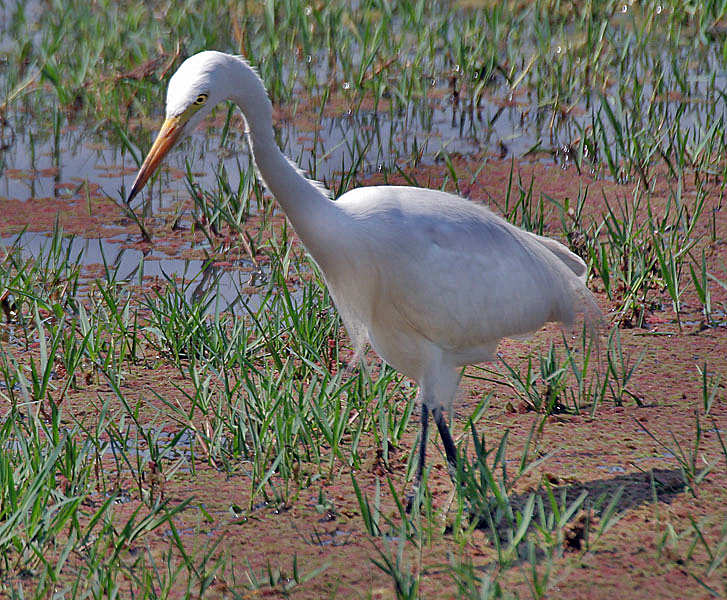
Intermediate egret

Order: Ciconiiformes Family: Ardeidae

The family Ardeidae contains the bitterns, herons and egrets. Herons and egrets are medium to large wading birds with long necks and legs. Bitterns tend to be shorter necked and more wary. Members of Ardeidae fly with their necks retracted, unlike other long-necked birds such as storks, ibises and spoonbills. There are 61 species worldwide and 20 species which occur in Thailand. Among the herons and egrets sighted in Phitsanulok Province are:

- Heron (genus and species not specified)
- Yellow-billed egret (Ardea intermedia)

==== Pigeons and doves ====
Order: Columbiformes Family: Columbidae

Pigeons and doves are stout-bodied birds with short necks and short slender bills with a fleshy cere. There are 308 species worldwide and 28 species which occur in Thailand. Among the species reported in Phitsanulok Province are:

- Ashy-headed green pigeon (Treron phayrei)

==== Hornbills ====
Order: Coraciiformes Family: Bucerotidae

Hornbills are a group of birds whose bill is shaped like a cow's horn, but without a twist, sometimes with a casque on the upper mandible. Frequently, the bill is brightly coloured. There are 57 species worldwide and 13 species which occur in Thailand. Presence of hornbills in Phitsanulok Province is confirmed by the Department of National Parks, but specific genera and species are not provided.

==== Kingfishers ====
Order: Coraciiformes Family: Halcyonidae

Kingfishers are medium-sized birds with large heads, long, pointed bills, short legs and stubby tails. There are 93 species worldwide and 16 species which occur in Thailand. Among the kingfishers sighted in Phitsanulok Province are:

- Ruddy kingfisher (Halcyon coromanda)

==== Hawks, kites and eagles ====
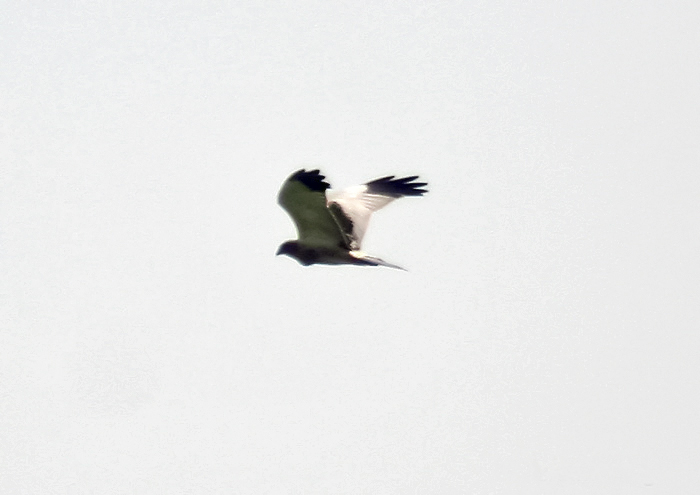
Pied harrier

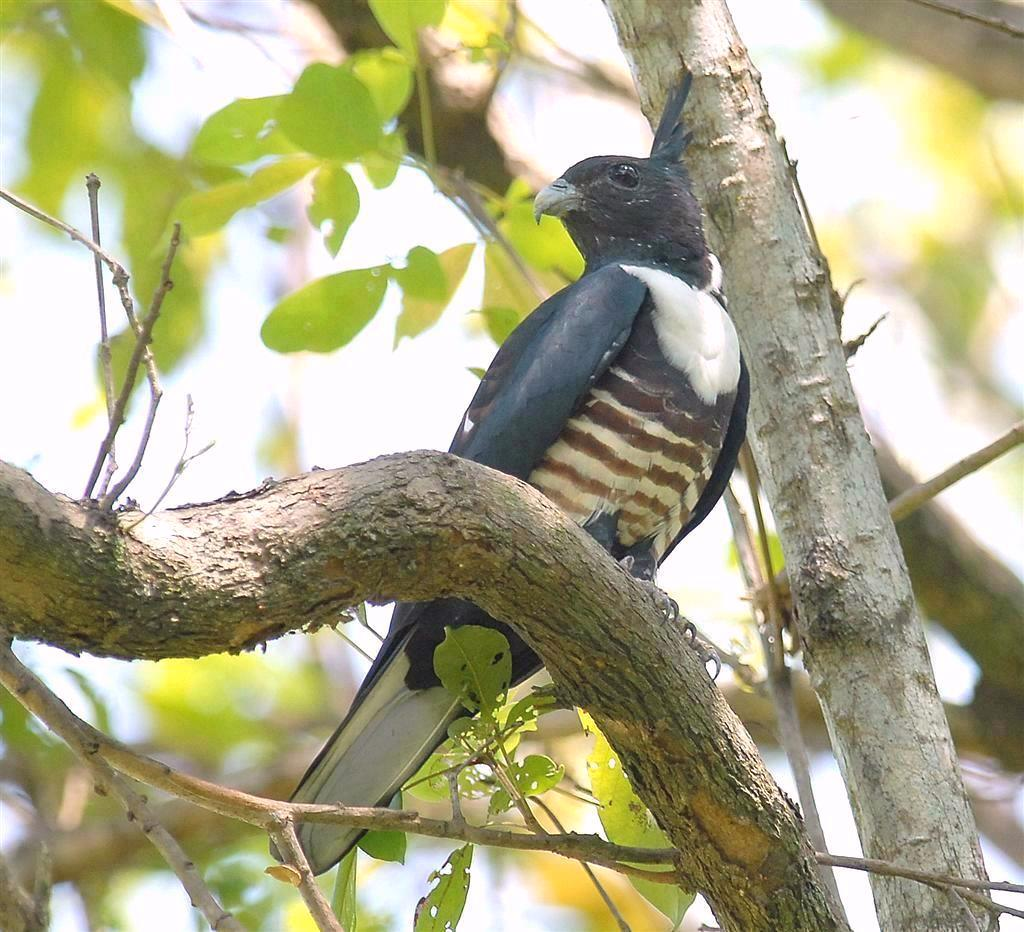
Black baza

Order: Falconiformes Family: Accipitridae

Accipitridae is a family of birds of prey, which includes hawks, eagles, kites, harriers and Old World vultures. These birds have powerful hooked beaks for tearing flesh from their prey, strong legs, powerful talons and keen eyesight. There are 233 species worldwide and 46 species which occur in Thailand. Among the Accipitridae sighted in Phitsanulok Province are:

- Chinese sparrowhawk (Accipiter soloensis)
- Black baza (Aviceda leuphotes)
- Rufous-winged buzzard (Butastur liventer)
- Pied harrier (Circus melanoleucos)

==== Caracaras and falcons ====
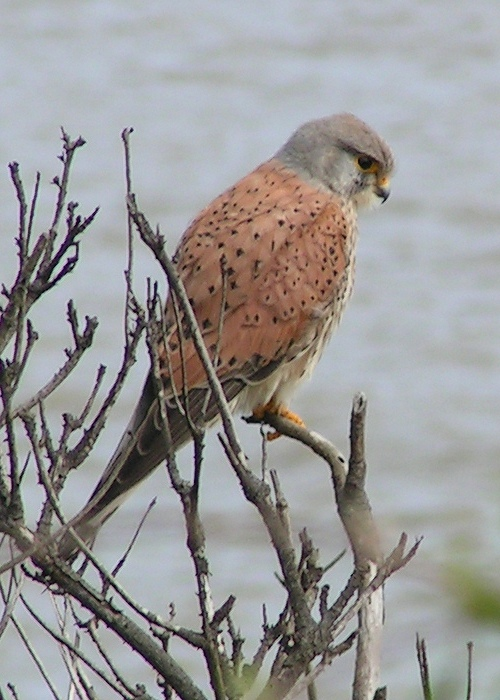
Eurasian kestrel

Order: Falconiformes Family: Falconidae

Falconidae is a family of diurnal birds of prey. They differ from hawks, eagles and kites in that they kill with their beaks instead of their talons. There are 62 species worldwide and 9 species which occur in Thailand. Among the Falconidae sighted in Phistanulok Province are:

- Peregrine falcon (Falco peregrinus)
- Eurasian kestral (Falco tinnunculus)

==== Pheasants and partridges ====
Order: Galliformes Family: Phasianidae

The Phasianidae are a family of terrestrial birds which consists of quails, partridges, snowcocks, francolins, spurfowls, tragopans, monals, pheasants, peafowls and jungle fowls. In general, they are plump (although they vary in size) and have broad, relatively short wings. There are 156 species worldwide and 26 species which occur in Thailand. The presence of the following species are reported in Phitsanulok Province by the Department of National Parks:

- The Siamese fireback (Lophura diardi), a near threatened species of pheasant, has been recently nominated as Thailand's national bird.
- Jungle fowl are believed to be the ancestors of the modern domesticated chicken. (specific species not provided)
- Partridge (specific genera and species not provided)

==== Flowerpeckers ====
Order: Passeriformes Family: Dicaeidae

The flowerpeckers are very small, stout, often brightly coloured birds, with short tails, short thick curved bills and tubular tongues. There are 44 species worldwide and 10 species which occur in Thailand. Presence of flowerpeckers in Phitsanulok Province is confirmed by the Department of National Parks, but specific genera and species are not provided.

==== Waxbills and allies ====
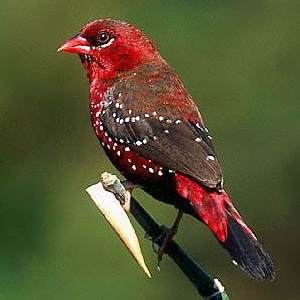
Strawberry finch

Order: Passeriformes Family: Estrildidae

The estrildid finches are small passerine birds of the Old World tropics and Australasia. They are gregarious and often colonial seed eaters with short thick but pointed bills. They are all similar in structure and habits, but have wide variation in plumage colours and patterns. There are 141 species worldwide and 8 species which occur in Thailand. Among the finch sighted in Phitsanulok Province are:

- Strawberry finch (Amandava amandava)

==== Swallows and martins ====
Order: Passeriformes Family: Hirundinidae

The family Hirundinidae is adapted to aerial feeding. They have a slender streamlined body, long pointed wings and a short bill with a wide gape. The feet are adapted to perching rather than walking, and the front toes are partially joined at the base. There are 75 species worldwide and 13 species which occur in Thailand. Among the martins sighted in Phitsanulok Province are:

- Nepal house martin (Delichon nipalensis)

==== Old World flycatchers ====
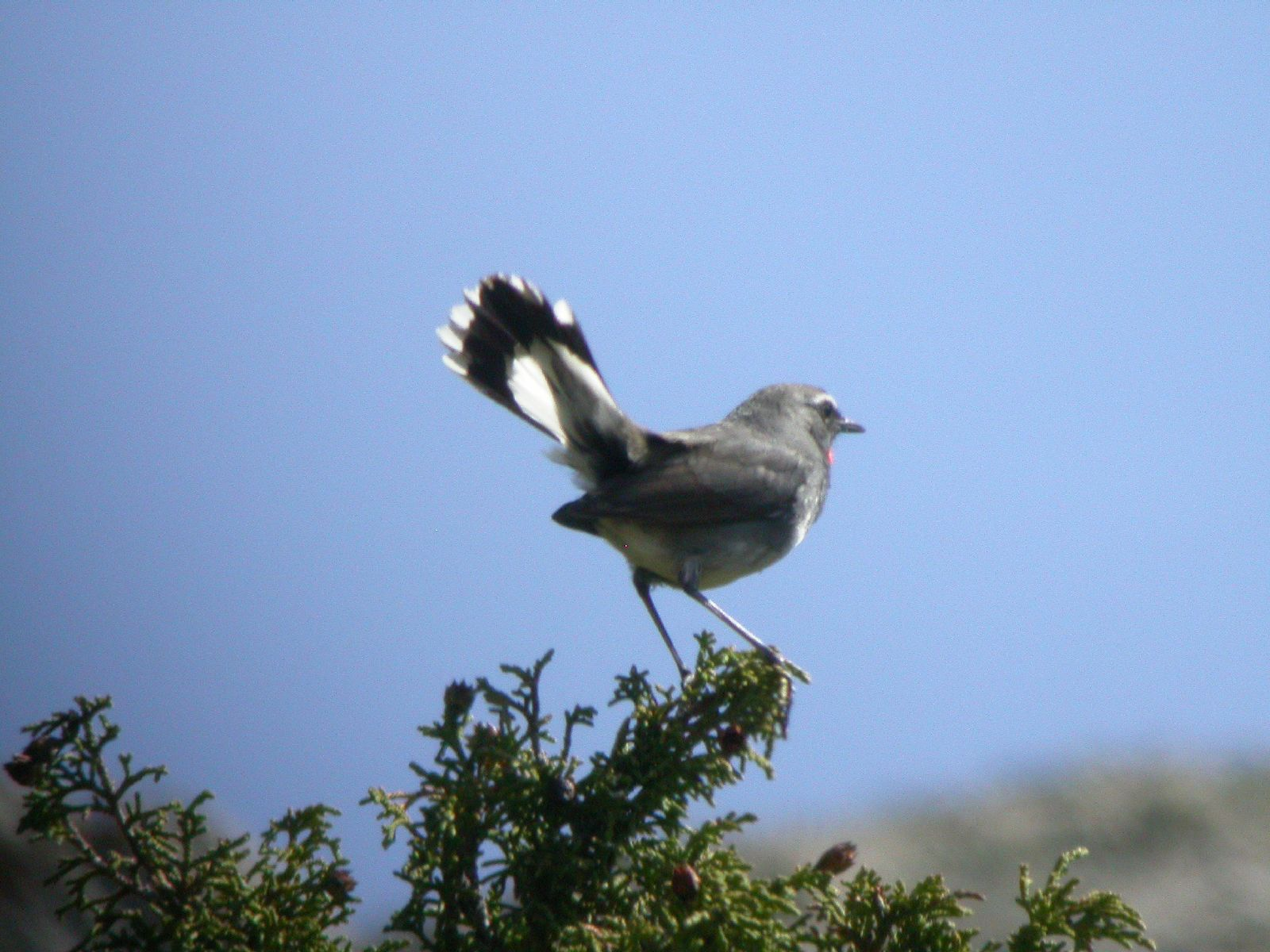
White-tailed rubythroat

Order: Passeriformes Family: Muscicapidae

Old World flycatchers are a large group of small passerine birds native to the Old World. They are mainly small arboreal insectivores. The appearance of these birds is highly varied, but they mostly have weak songs and harsh calls. There 274 species worldwide and 69 species which occur in Thailand. Among the flycatchers sighted in Phitsanulok Province are:

- Yellow-rumped flycatcher (Ficedula zanthopygia)
- White-tailed rubythroat (Luscinia pectoralis)
- Jerdon's bushchat (Saxicola jerdoni)

==== Bulbuls ====
Order: Passeriformes Family: Pycnonotidae

Bulbuls are medium-sized songbirds. Some are colourful with yellow, red or orange vents, cheeks, throats or supercilia, but most are drab, with uniform olive-brown to black plumage. Some species have distinct crests. There are 130 species worldwide and 36 species which occur in Thailand. Presence of bulbuls in Phitsanulok Province is confirmed by the Department of National Parks, but specific genera and species are not provided.

==== Babblers ====
Order: Passeriformes Family: Timaliidae

The babblers, or timaliids, are somewhat diverse in size and coloration, but are characterised by soft fluffy plumage. There are 270 species worldwide and 76 species which occur in Thailand. Presence of babblers in Phitsanulok Province is confirmed by the Department of National Parks, but specific genera and species are not provided.

==== Thrushes and allies ====
Order: Passeriformes Family: Turdidae

The thrushes are a group of passerine birds that occur mainly in the Old World. They are plump, soft plumaged, small to medium-sized insectivores or sometimes omnivores, often feeding on the ground. Many have attractive songs. There are 335 species worldwide and 21 species which occur in Thailand. Among the thrush sighted in Phitsanulok Province are:

- Dusky thrush (Turdus naumanni)

==== Darters ====
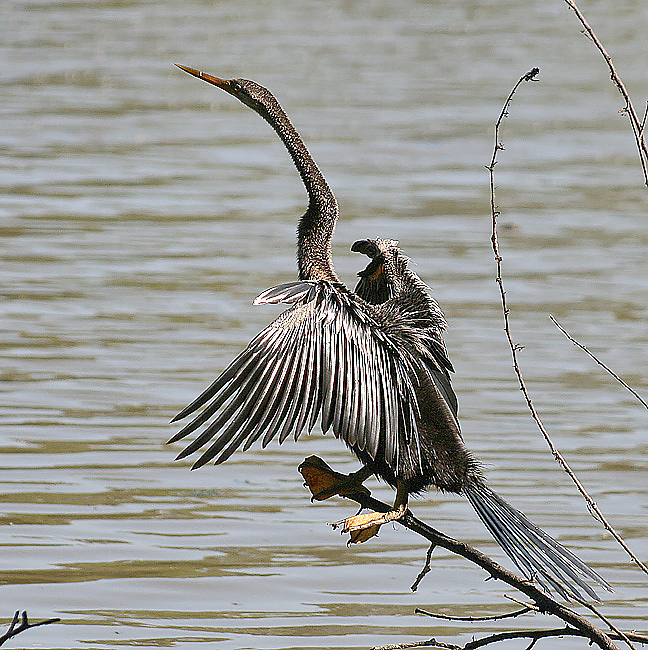
Oriental darter

Order: Pelecaniformes Family: Anhingidae

Darters are often called "snake-birds" because of their long thin neck, which gives a snake-like appearance when they swim with their bodies submerged. The males have black and dark-brown plumage, an erectile crest on the nape and a larger bill than the female. The females have much paler plumage especially on the neck and underparts. The darters have completely webbed feet and their legs are short and set far back on the body. Their plumage is somewhat permeable, like that of cormorants, and they spread their wings to dry after diving. There are 4 species worldwide and 1 species which occurs in Thailand, the Oriental darter (Anhinga melanogaster). This near threatened species was sighted in Phitsanulok in 2006 and 2007.

==== Woodpeckers and allies ====
Order: Piciformes Family: Picidae

Woodpeckers are small to medium-sized birds with chisel-like beaks, short legs, stiff tails and long tongues used for capturing insects. Some species have feet with two toes pointing forward and two backward, while several species have only three toes. Many woodpeckers have the habit of tapping noisily on tree trunks with their beaks. There are 218 species worldwide and 36 species which occur in Thailand. Among the woodpeckers observed in Phitsanulok Province include:

- Common flameback (Dinopium javanense)

==== Owl ====
- Asian barred owlet
- Brown boobook

==== Other birds ====
- Warbler (specific genera and species not provided)

=== Other animals ===
A sampling of some of the other wild animals in Phitsanulok Province include:

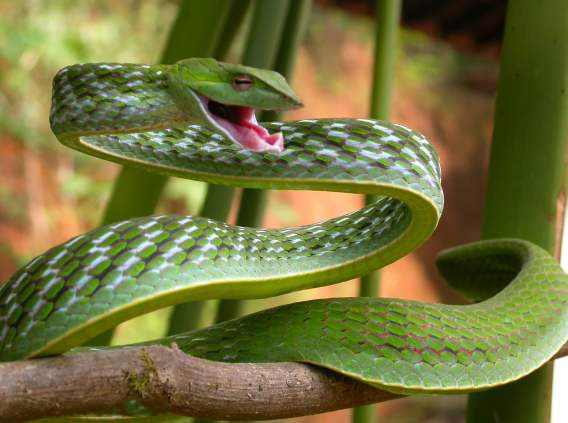
Green vine snake

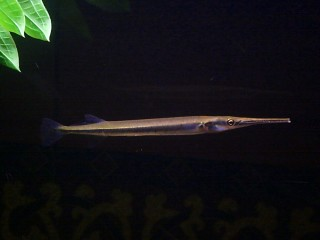
Freshwater garfish

- Crab
- Reptile
  - Lizard
    - Monitor lizard
    - Gecko
  - Snake
    - Green vine snake (Ahaetulla nasuta)
- Amphibians
- Fish
  - Betta
  - Nemacheilinae
  - Freshwater garfish (Xenentodon cancila)
  - Catfish
- Insect
  - Mosquito
  - Dragonfly
  - Butterfly

== Plants ==
Phitsanulok Province is the native habitat of a wide variety of plantlife, including flowering plants, conifers and clubmosses. Deforestation throughout Southeast Asia has caused a number of the represented species to be classified as endangered or vulnerable. The following plant species can presently be found in the nature areas of Phitsanulok Province, according to the Department of National Parks:

=== Flowering plants ===
==== Dipterocarpaceae ====
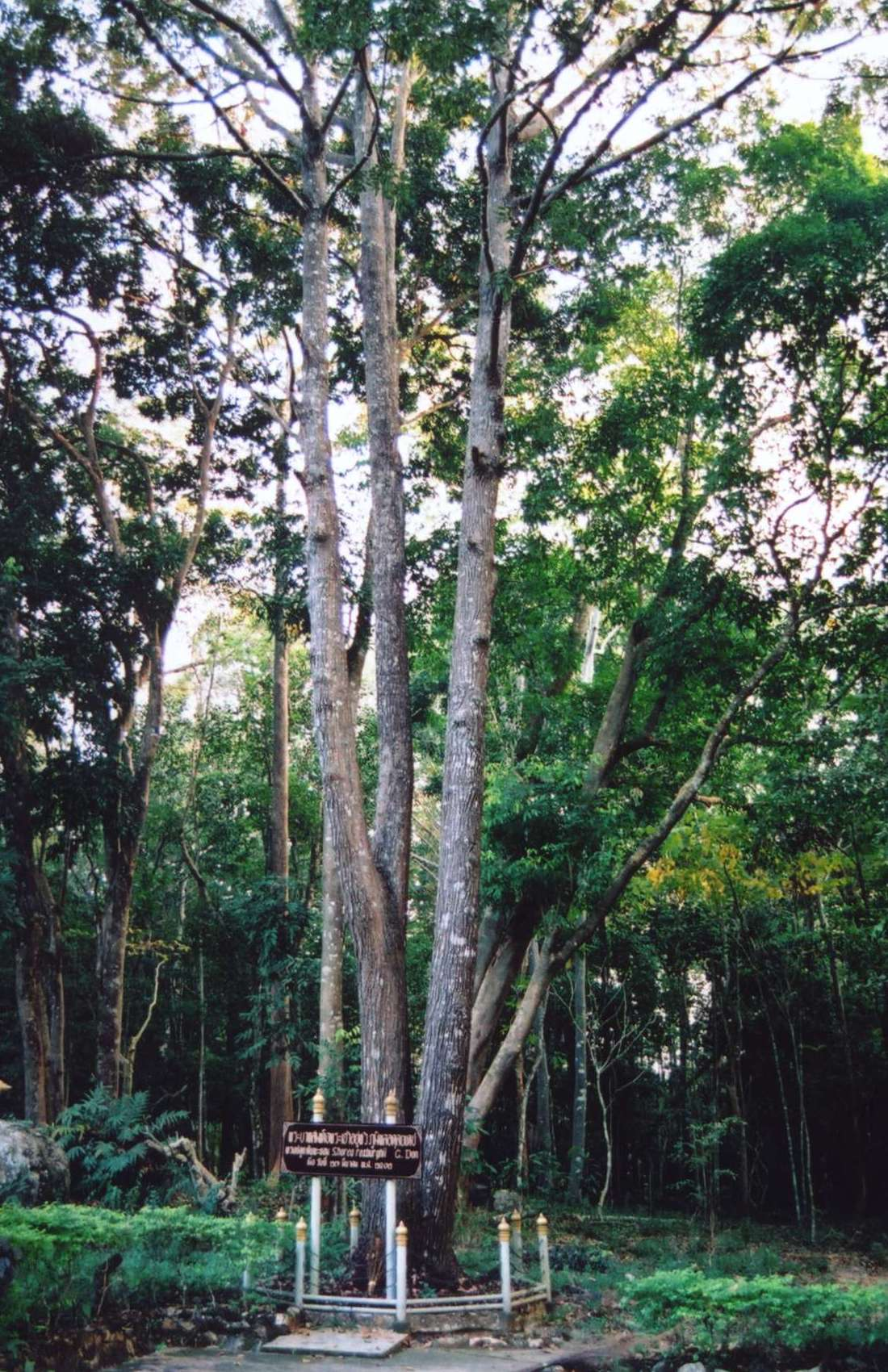
The phayom tree is among the endangered species found within Phitsanulok Province.

Dipterocarpaceae is a family of 17 genera and approximately 580–680 species of mainly tropical lowland rainforest trees with two-winged fruits. The largest genera are Shorea (360 species), Hopea (105 species), Dipterocarpus (70 species), and Vatica (60 species). Many are large forest emergent species, typically reaching heights of 40–70 metres (130–230 ft) tall, with the tallest known living specimen over 85 m (300 ft) tall. The species of this family are of major importance in the timber trade. Dipterocarpacae of Phitsanulok Province include:

- Dipterocarpus alatus
- Dipterocarpus obtusifolius
- Dipterocarpus tuberculatus
- Anisoptera costata
- Siamese sal (Shorea obtusa)
- Ingyin (Shorea siamensis)
- Phayom (Shorea roxburghii)
- Hopea ferrea
- Hopea odorata

Of these, phayom and Hopea ferrea are endangered species, while Hopea odorata is a vulnerable species.

==== Liliopsida ====
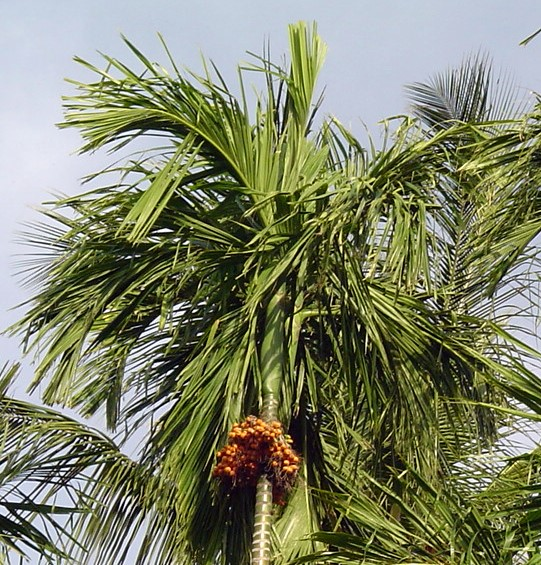
Betel palm

- Burmannia disticha
- Betel palm (Areca catechu)
- Rattan
- Bamboo

==== Fabales ====
- Dalbergia oliveri
- Buemese ebony (Pterocarpus macrocarpus)
- Makhaa-mong (Afzelia xylocarpa)
- Xylia xylocarpa

Of these, Dalbergia oliveri is an endangered species.

==== Other flowering plants ====
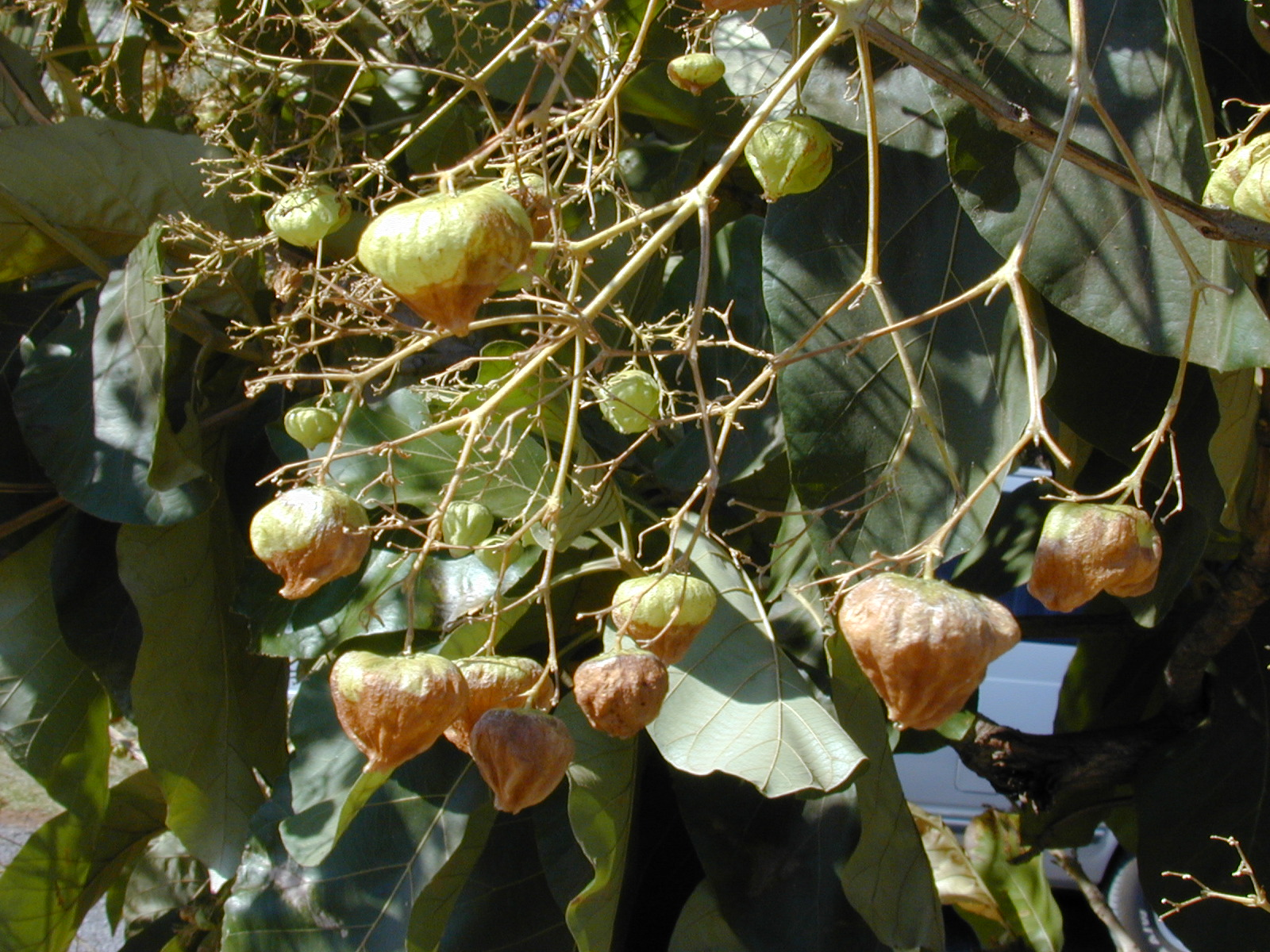
Teak

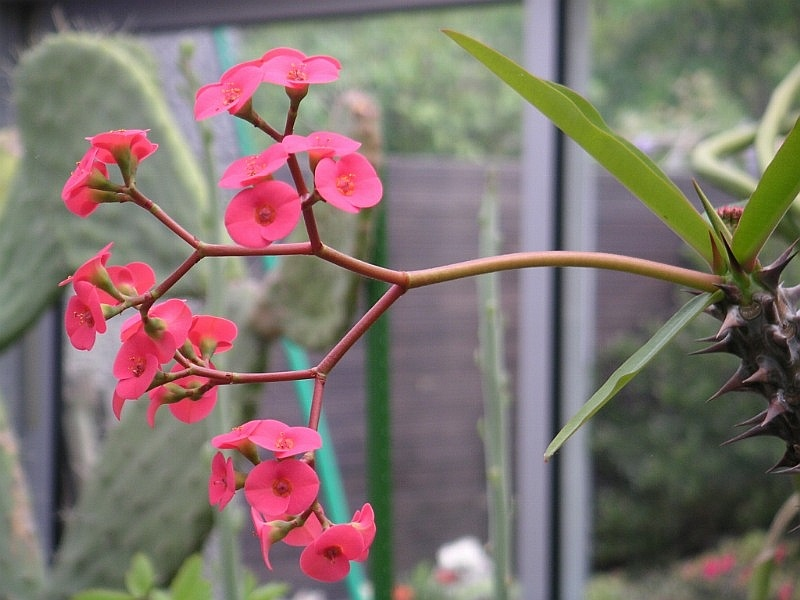
Crown-of-thorns

- Teak (Tectona grandis)
- Lagerstroemia
- Beech trees
- Wild mango
- Ironwood
- Eugenia cumini
- Alder-leaf birch (Betula alnoides)
- Osbeckia chinensis
- Rhododendron
- Chukrasia venlatina
- Anneslea fragrans
- Crown-of-thorns (Euphorbia milii)

=== Conifers ===
- Dacrydium elatum
- Podocarpus imbricatus
- Tenasserim pine (Pinus latteri)

Of these, the Sumatran pine is a vulnerable species.

=== Clubmosses ===
- Huperzia phlegmaria

== Conservation ==
Conservation of the region's natural wildlife is just beginning to be realized in the province. Plans for sustainable development are being implemented, and over the last 30 years, more and more land has been set aside as protected areas. The protected areas in Phitsanulok include the province's five national parks.

== See also ==
- List of species native to Thailand
- Environmental issues in Thailand

== Related links ==
Fish Species in Chao Praya River
