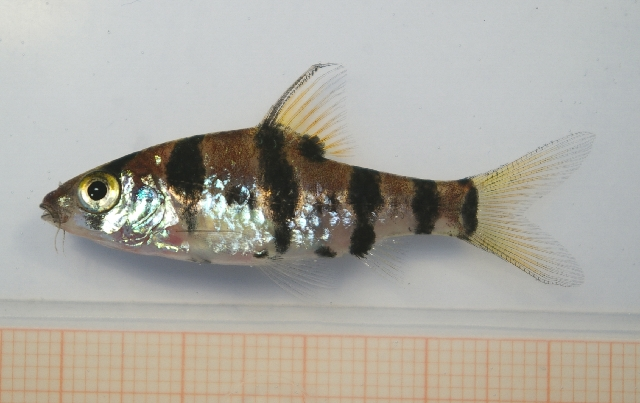

Scientific classification
- Kingdom: Animalia
- Phylum: Chordata
- Class: Actinopterygii
- Order: Cypriniformes
- Family: Cyprinidae
- Subfamily: Smiliogastrinae
- Genus: Desmopuntius
- Species: D. foerschi

Binomial name
- Desmopuntius foerschi (Kottelat, 1982)

Synonyms
- Barbus foerschi Kottelat, 1982; Puntius foerschi (Kottelat, 1982); Systomus foerschi (Kottelat, 1982)

= Desmopuntius foerschi =

Species of fish

Desmopuntius foerschi is a species of cyprinid endemic to southern Borneo. This species grows to a length of 5.3 centimetres (2.1 in) SL.
