= Desmopuntius endecanalis =

Scientific classification
- Kingdom: Animalia
- Phylum: Chordata
- Class: Actinopterygii
- Order: Cypriniformes
- Family: Cyprinidae
- Subfamily: Smiliogastrinae
- Genus: Desmopuntius
- Species: D. endecanalis

Binomial name
- Desmopuntius endecanalis (T. R. Roberts, 1989)

Synonyms
- Puntius endecanalis T. R. Roberts, 1989; Systomus endecanalis (T. R. Roberts, 1989)

Species of fish

Desmopuntius endecanalis is a species of cyprinid fish endemic to the Kapuas River basin in western Borneo. This species can reach a standard length of 4.8 cm (1.9 in). Although placed in the genus Systomus by FishBase, it has been moved to Desmopuntius by Catalog of Fishes, following a taxonomic review by Maurice Kottelat in 2013.
