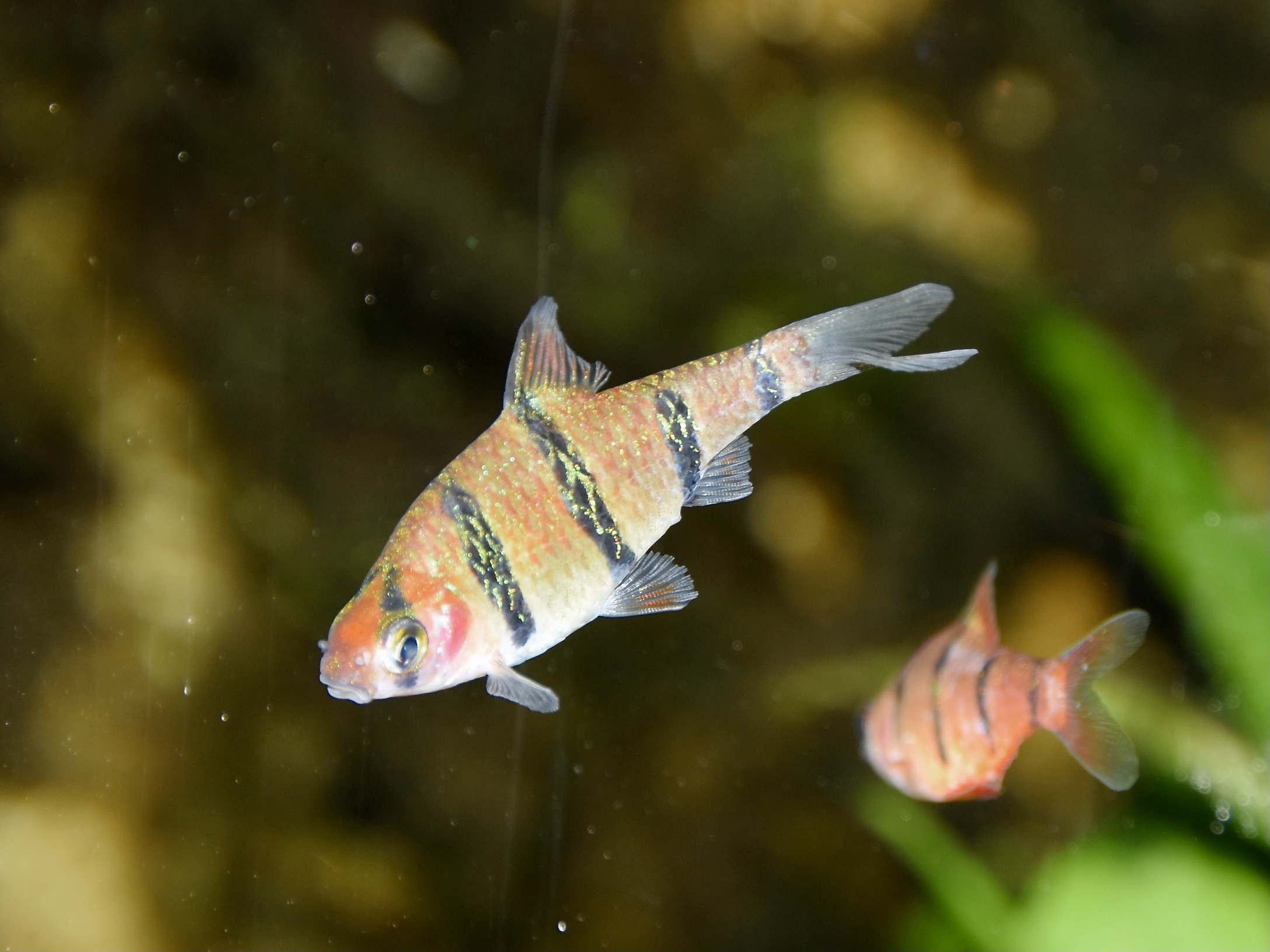

Conservation status
- Least Concern (IUCN 3.1)

Scientific classification
- Kingdom: Animalia
- Phylum: Chordata
- Class: Actinopterygii
- Order: Cypriniformes
- Family: Cyprinidae
- Subfamily: Smiliogastrinae
- Genus: Desmopuntius
- Species: D. pentazona

Binomial name
- Desmopuntius pentazona (Boulenger, 1894)

Synonyms
- Barbus pentazona Boulenger, 1894; Barbus pentazona pentazona Boulenger, 1894; Capoeta pentazona (Boulenger, 1894); Puntius pentazona (Boulenger, 1894); Systomus pentazona (Boulenger, 1894)

= Fiveband barb =

Species of fish

The fiveband barb (Desmopuntius pentazona) is a species of cyprinid freshwater fish from Southeast Asia. This species is restricted to blackwater streams and peat swamps in northwestern Borneo and possibly Peninsular Malaysia, but it has often been confused (especially in the aquarium trade) with the more widespread, closely related D. hexazona, which is similar except that it lacks the black spot at the rear base of the dorsal fin seen in D. pentazona.

The fish superficially resembles the tiger barb (Puntigrus tetrazona), except that there are five black vertical bands on an orange or gold body instead of four bands on the tiger barb. The fish will grow to a maximum length of 8.8 centimetres (3.5 in) TL.

The fish lives natively in calm tropical waters in the lowlands in water with a 5–6 pH, a water hardness of 5–12.0 dGH, and a temperature range of 74–84 °F (23–29 °C).

Fiveband barbs are egg-scatterers that spawn among a coarse gravel bed in open water. Once spawning is finished, they will usually eat any of the approximately 200 eggs that they find. It is usually necessary to separate the fish from the eggs after spawning in order to prevent the eggs from being eaten. The eggs will hatch in approximately 1 day.

== In the aquarium ==
The fiveband barb is a harmless, active schooling fish that is usually kept in groups of 5 or more. They prefer a well planted environment with rocks and driftwood but still need plenty of space to school. Also they are community fish meaning they can be in the tank with other fish such as guppies, mollies, harlequin rasboras and some types of tetra.

== See also ==
- List of freshwater aquarium fish species
