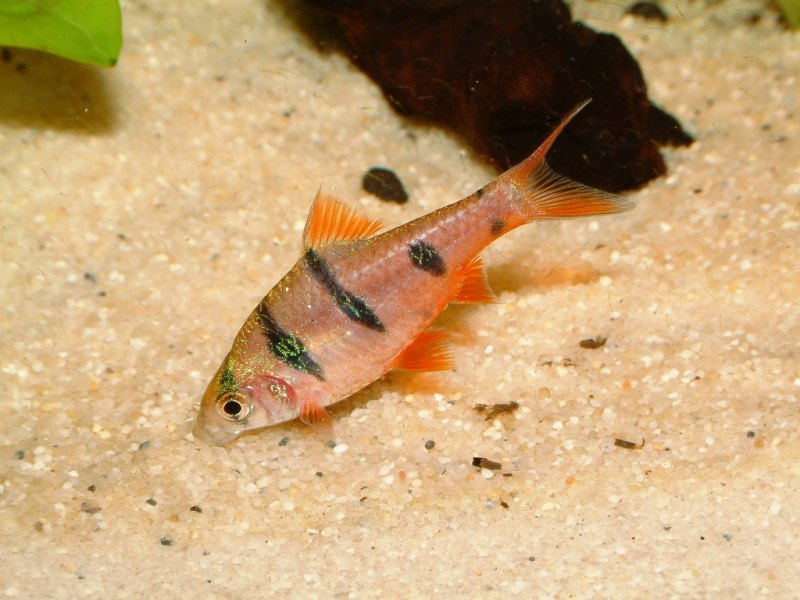

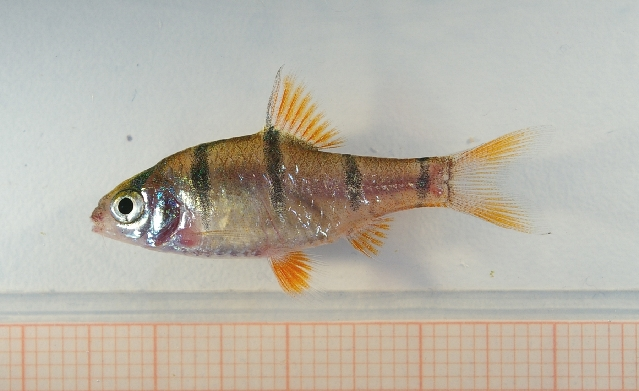

Scientific classification
- Kingdom: Animalia
- Phylum: Chordata
- Class: Actinopterygii
- Order: Cypriniformes
- Family: Cyprinidae
- Subfamily: Smiliogastrinae
- Genus: Desmopuntius
- Species: D. hexazona

Binomial name
- Desmopuntius hexazona (M. C. W. Weber & de Beaufort, 1912)

Synonyms
- Barbus hexazona M. C. W. Weber & de Beaufort, 1912; Puntius hexazona (M. C. W. Weber & de Beaufort, 1912); Systomus hexazona (M. C. W. Weber & de Beaufort, 1912)

= Six-banded tiger barb =

Species of fish

The six-banded tiger barb (Desmopuntius hexazona) is a Southeast Asian species of cyprinid fish native to blackwater streams, peat swamps and other freshwater habitats with little movement in the Malay Peninsula, Sumatra and Borneo. Although there are reports from the Mekong basin, this is generally consider to be outside the range of the genus Desmopuntius. D. hexazona has often been confused—especially in the aquarium trade—with the less widespread, closely related D. pentazona, which is similar except that it has a black spot at the rear base of its dorsal fin (something that D. hexazona lacks). Although overall relatively widespread, D. hexazona is considered threatened in Singapore. This species reaches a total length of 5.5 cm (2.2 in).
