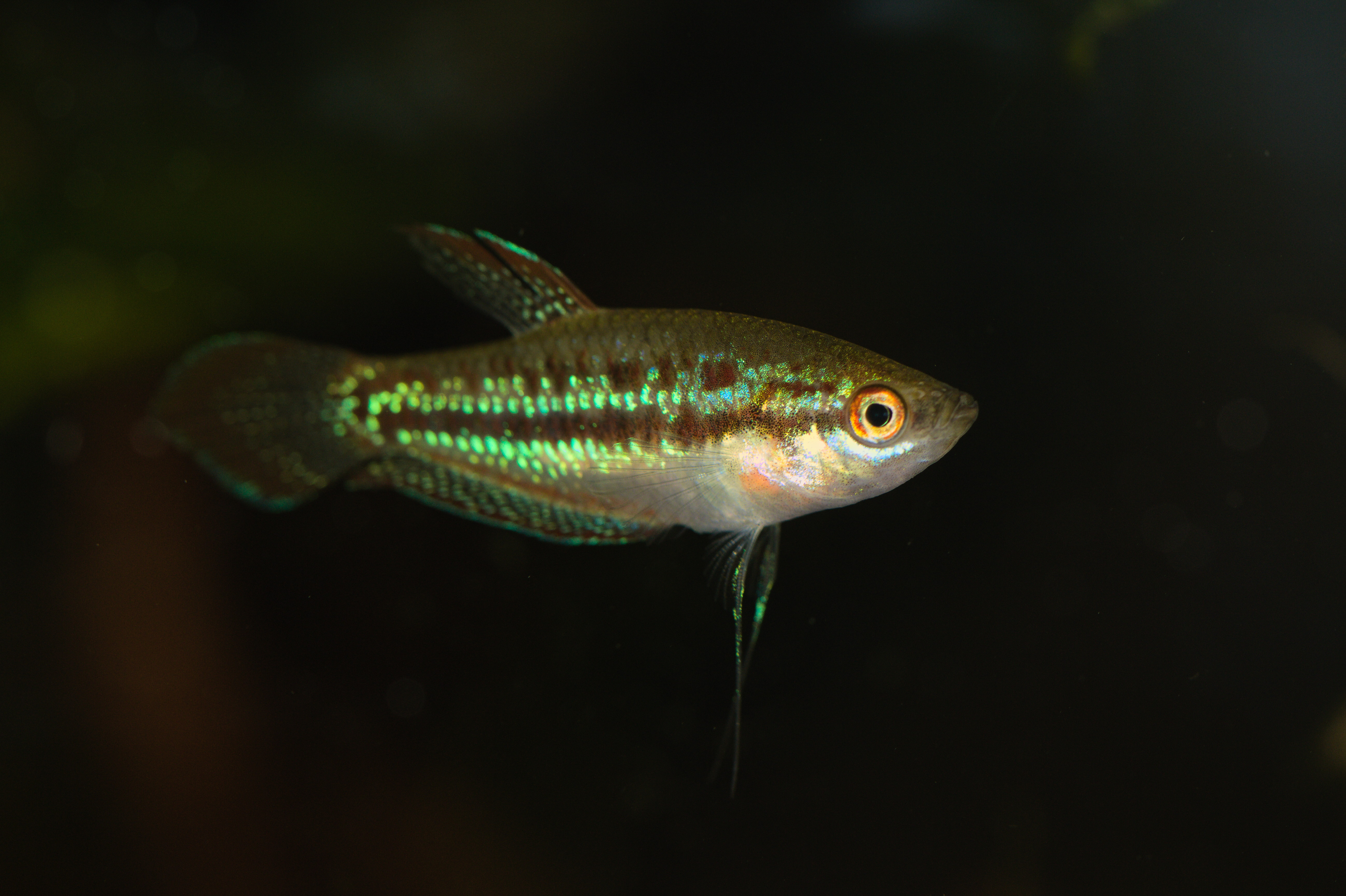

Conservation status
- Least Concern (IUCN 3.1)

Scientific classification
- Kingdom: Animalia
- Phylum: Chordata
- Class: Actinopterygii
- Division: Teleostei
- Order: Anabantiformes
- Family: Osphronemidae
- Genus: Trichopsis
- Species: T. pumila

Binomial name
- Trichopsis pumila (J.P. Arnold, 1936)
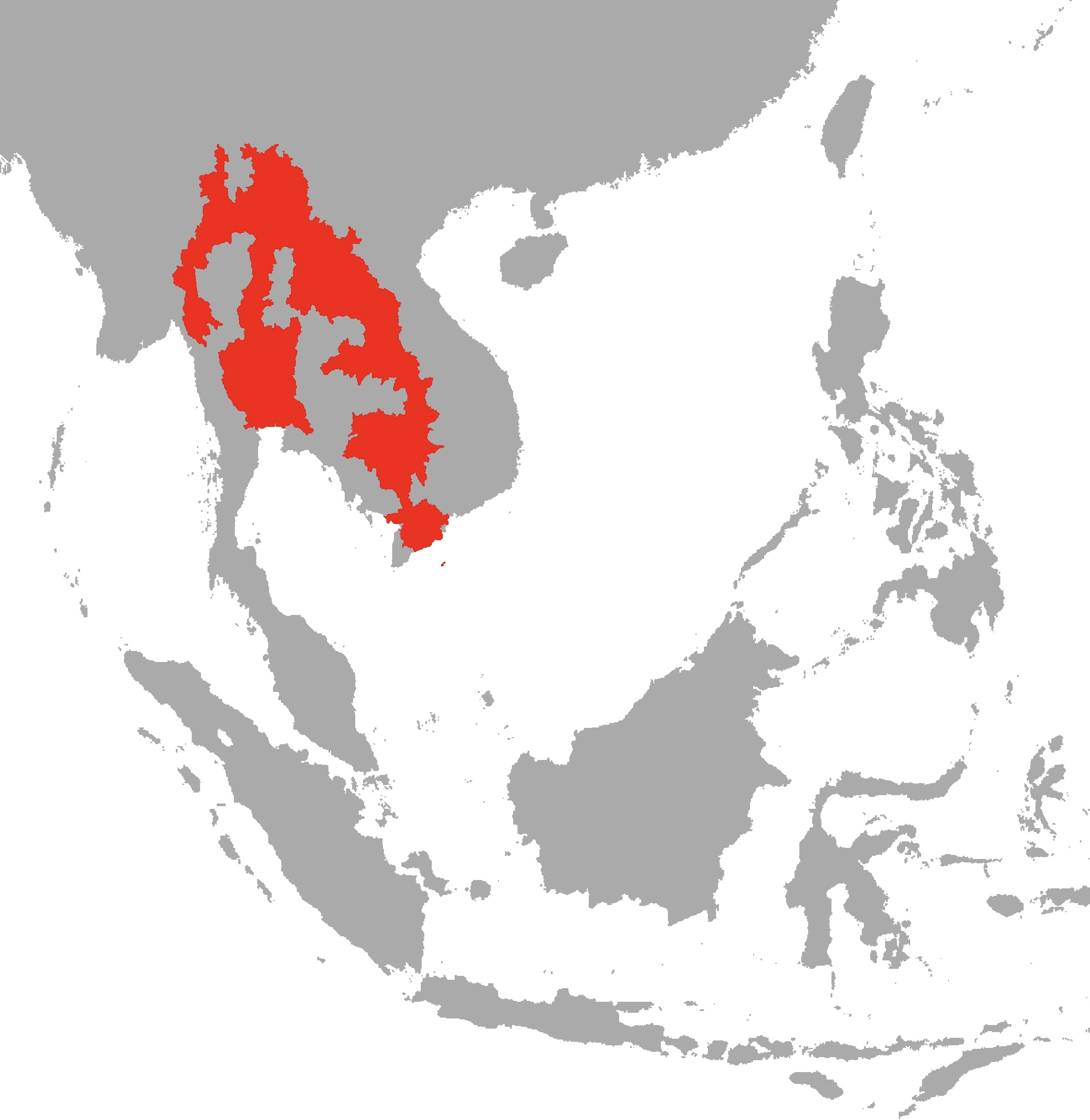
- Red: possibly extant

Synonyms
- Ctenops pumilus J.P. Arnold, 1936

= Pygmy gourami =

Species of fish

The pygmy gourami (Trichopsis pumila), also known as the sparkling gourami, dwarf croaking gourami or Jorge’s gourami is a freshwater species of gourami native to Southeast Asia.

== Description ==
Pygmy gouramis can reach a length of 4 centimetres (1.6 in) SL. In color, they sparkle with red, green, and blue hues, and can produce an audible croaking noise using a specialised pectoral mechanism. In the right light, its eyes appear bright blue, and its arrowhead-shaped body and caudal fins reflect a rainbow of colors as it swims. Sexing is difficult, but males have red spots above the "body line" or the stripe through their body, and females spots are duller.

== Habitat ==
Its native habitat is slow rivers, rice paddies, ditches and small ponds. It is most commonly found in standing not stagnant water (including waters with low oxygen levels) that has a dense cover of floating plants. The pygmy gourami can survive in these waters because of its labyrinth organ, which allows it to breathe air from the surface. Its native habitat has a pH of 6.0–7.5, dH of 5–19, and temperature 25 to 28 °C (77 to 82 °F). It feeds on zooplankton and aquatic insects.

== Biology ==
The sparkling gourami has the ability to produce a distinctive croaking or clicking sound. This sound, often associated with courtship rituals or territorial disputes, is produced by their pectoral muscles.

=== Reproduction ===
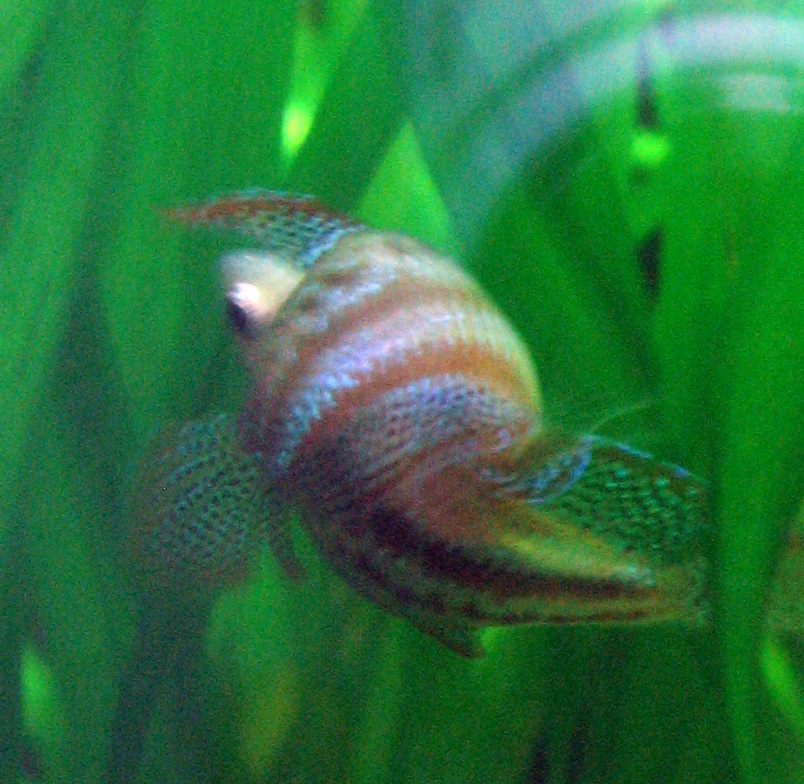
Pygmy gourami spawning

Pygmy gouramis can be induced to breed by raising the temperature and dropping the water level about 15 cm (5.9 in).

During mating, the male embraces the female, with their bodies intertwining tightly. The female releases a packet of eggs which is then collected and deposited into a bubble nest created earlier by the male. The nests are usually constructed under broad leaved plants or among the leaves of floating plants; however, in the aquarium this can include tubes and other filtering paraphernalia. Other tankmates should ideally be removed at this point, since the male vigorously guards the eggs and may attack other fish. The male can be left with the eggs until they hatch.

The eggs hatch in 1–2 days and remain in the nest for a further 2–3 days absorbing their yolk sac. The free-swimming fry are tiny and require microscopic infusoria until they are large enough to accept newly hatched brine shrimp or dry food. The water in the tank should be kept very clean with frequent small water changes.

== Importance to humans ==
The pygmy gourami can be found in the aquarium trade.

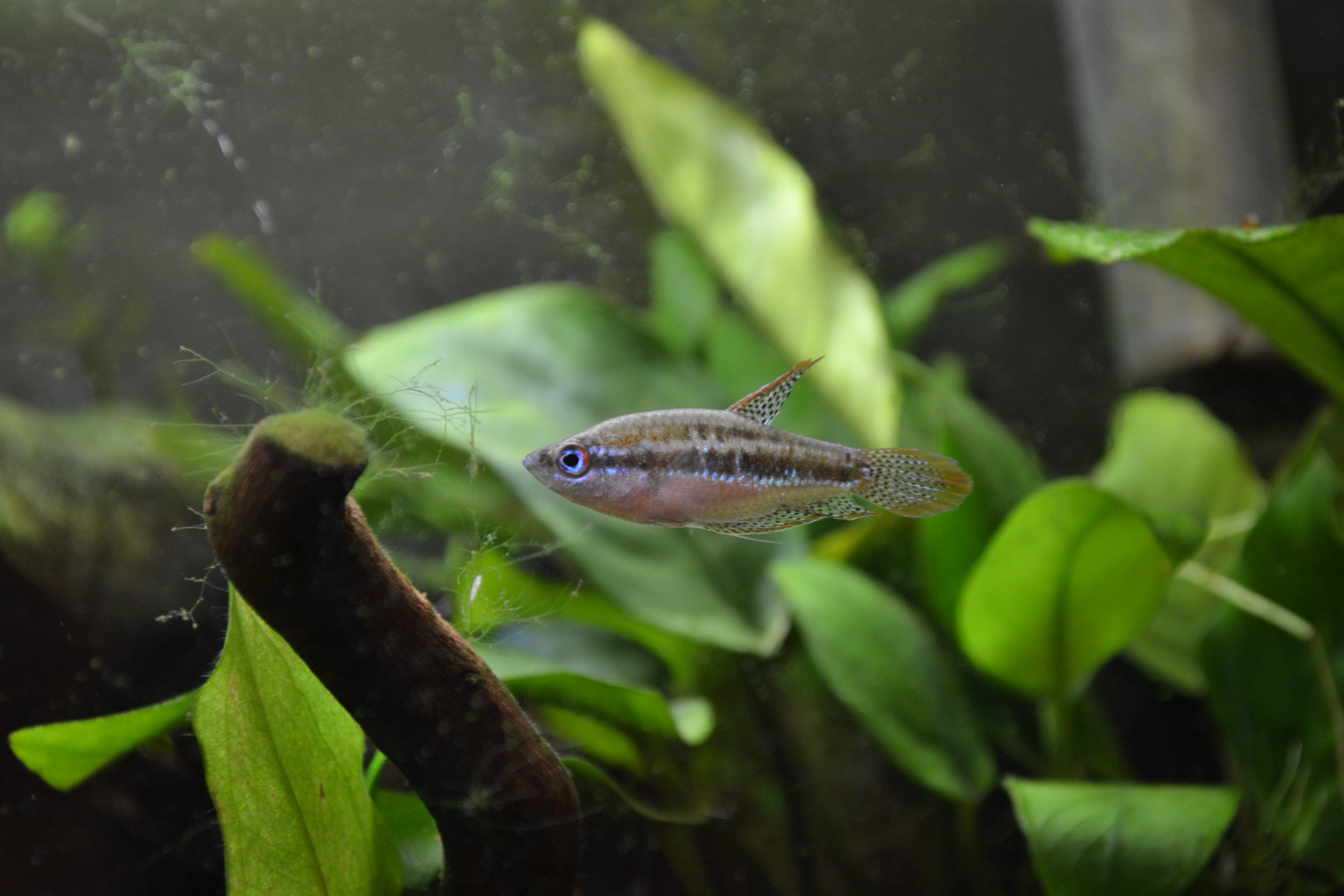
A pygmy gourami

The pygmy gourami is hardy and tolerant of less-than-ideal water conditions in the tank. It is important to avoid any strong currents in the aquarium and have plenty of hiding places; a heavily planted tank with subdued lighting is ideal. They require some space between the top of the water and the tank cover from which to gulp moist air. Preferred water conditions include a temperature of 25 °C (77 °F) or above, and a pH of less than 7.

While these are not schooling fish, they can usually be kept peacefully in small groups. They will not compete well for food with aggressive tank mates and will not cope well with constant harassment. Nippy fish such as tiger barbs or large danios are poor choices for tank companions. They will be targeted by male bettas so should not be kept with them. Because of their small size, pygmy gouramis are an ideal choice for smaller aquaria. A good size aquarium for a trio or pair would be a planted 10 gallon tank. While they can be single housed in smaller aquaria, they are better suited to larger groups with ample space.

Sparkling gouramis sometimes prey on smaller shrimp species such as those from genera Neocaridina and Caridina.

They are not finicky about food, and will readily accept flake foods, live foods, or frozen foods — once or twice every day.
