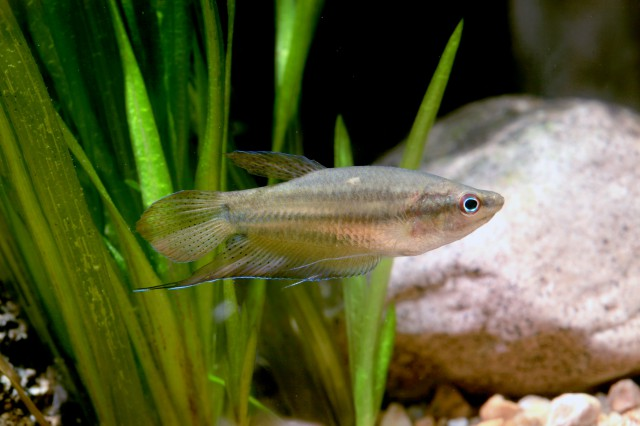

Conservation status
- Least Concern (IUCN 3.1)

Scientific classification
- Kingdom: Animalia
- Phylum: Chordata
- Class: Actinopterygii
- Order: Anabantiformes
- Family: Osphronemidae
- Genus: Trichopsis
- Species: T. vittata

Binomial name
- Trichopsis vittata (Cuvier, 1831)
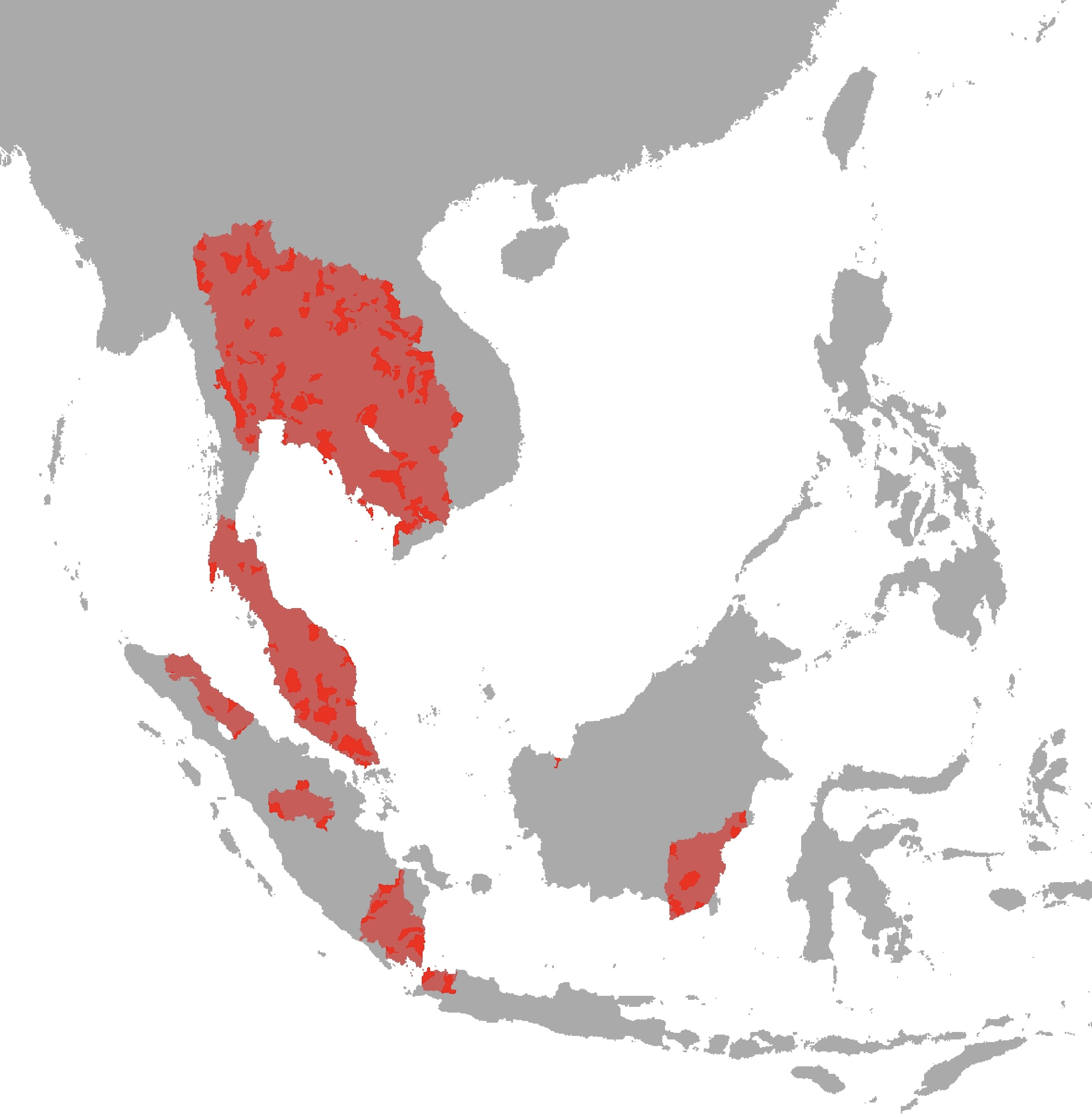
- Red: extant, Light red: possibly extant

Synonyms
- Osphromenus vittatus Cuvier, 1831; Ctenops vittatus (Cuvier, 1831); Trichopus striatus Bleeker, 1850; Trichopsis harrisi Fowler, 1934

= Croaking gourami =

Species of fish

The croaking gourami (Trichopsis vittata) is a species of freshwater labyrinth fish of the gourami family Osphronemidae. It is native to still waters in Southeast Asia such as Thailand, Borneo and parts of Java island, but due to the aquarium trade, the fish has spread to other parts of Southeast Asia (like East Malaysia) and to other parts of the world. As the common name suggests, this species is capable of producing a "croaking" noise using its pectoral fins.

== Description ==
The croaking gourami reaches an average size of about 5 cm (2.0 in), though some individuals can grow as long as 6 or 7 cm (2.4 or 2.8 in). Coloration is highly variable, ranging from pale brown and green to dark purple with black or red spots on the fins. 2 to 4 brown or black stripes or rows of spots are present on the flanks. Median fins have a thin iridescent blue coloration on their edges, and the iris is bright blue or purple. Females tend to be paler than males, with a slightly rounded dorsal fin (the dorsal fin of males is instead pointed) and a shorter anal fin.

== Distribution and habitat ==
The croaking gourami is native to stillwater habitats including ponds, canals and paddy fields in Java, Borneo, Sumatra, Malaya, Thailand, Laos, Cambodia, and Vietnam. A breeding population is known to exist in a series of drainage ditches in Florida; this population is almost certainly introduced there through the aquarium trade.

== Behavior ==
As the common name suggests, croaking gouramis are capable of producing an audible grunting or chirping noise, accomplished through the use of specialized adaptations of their pectoral fins. These noises are produced by both sexes during breeding displays and during the establishment of dominance hierarchies among males. A typical showdown between males consists of each fish circling the other, flaring fins, aggressively darting (though rarely making contact), and producing croaking noises. Well-matched individuals may continue this behavior for several hours at a time.

== In the aquarium ==
=== General ===
The croaking gourami is a fairly shy, peaceful fish that does well in most community aquaria, not causing problems with tankmates. Males can be fairly territorial and aggressive towards each other during breeding periods, but will not cause harm and can peacefully coexist given a large enough aquarium. This species requires a tank no smaller than 40 L (11 U.S. gal), preferably larger. The croaking gourami will prowl about all areas of the aquarium, preferring to lurk among reeds and under large leaves close to the water surface. At night, they might be found "sleeping" at the bottom, even resting on the substrate (which is not normally a cause for concern), or hovering motionless at the water surface.

Like all members of the suborder Anabantoidei, if necessary, the croaking gourami can breathe atmospheric oxygen from above the water surface using a specialized labyrinth organ. It is important, therefore, that the surface of the water be exposed to fresh air, usually accomplished by keeping them in an open-top tank or using a hood that allows air ventilation. If the tank has good air pumps, this is not always needed, since the air pumps will refresh the air above the water.

The aquarium should be heavily planted and have at least part of the surface shaded by broad leaves or floating plants, since the croaking gourami will become severely stressed in bare tanks without various hiding places. A darker substrate will make this fish feel comfortable and help show off its subtle colors. Like most gouramis, the croaking gourami is susceptible to diseases and infections (for instance, very cold air temperatures at the water surface may lead to infections of the labyrinth organ), so regular water changes and temperature maintenance (both in and above the tank) are a must. This species is tolerant of fairly high temperatures: temperatures of 29 °C (84 °F) are easily tolerated though 26 °C (79 °F) seems to be close to optimal. A pH of 6.8 is about right and peat filtration is recommended. Furthermore, this species is very sensitive to noise, so the tank should be in a quiet area.

=== Tankmates ===
The croaking gourami should not be kept with large, aggressive fish, and pairs wells with other small, peaceful fish, as well as with fellow gouramis. Male bettas are known to target this species, so bettas should not be kept as tankmates.

=== Diet ===
In the wild, the croaking gourami is mostly insectivorous, feeding on insects and insect larvae. However, other food types, such as zooplankton, crustaceans, shrimp meat and plant matter, are eaten as well. In aquaria, a varied diet is recommended: standard flake foods along with regular supplements of freeze-dried bloodworms, tubifex worms, brine shrimp, and some algae-based flakes will provide the fish with proper nutrition. Occasional feedings of live brine shrimp offer the aquarist an opportunity to observe the natural hunting behaviour of this species.

=== Breeding ===
Like many other gouramis, the male croaking gourami is a bubblenest builder, creating a small nest from air bubbles and mucus under a leaf. The water level should be reduced to 20 cm (7.9 in) during spawning, circulation kept minimal, and the temperature should be approximately 28 °C (82 °F). Spawning occurs under the nest, with the female responding to the male's dance by rolling over, followed by the typical gourami embrace. About 5 to 10 eggs are released in a quick burst. The male will grab the eggs and spit them into the nest, often adding a few more bubbles for good measure. This act may be repeated a dozen times or more until about 100 eggs are laid (some large females may lay more than 200).

After spawning, the female should be moved to a different tank (to prevent her from eating the eggs). The male will keep the bubblenest maintained and tend to the eggs and fry, but when the fry are 2 to 3 days old, the male should also be removed (for the same reason). When first hatched, the fry should be fed infusoria, and later, baby brine shrimp and fine ground flakes. Freeze-dried tablets may also be fed to older fry.
