= List of Liolaemus species =

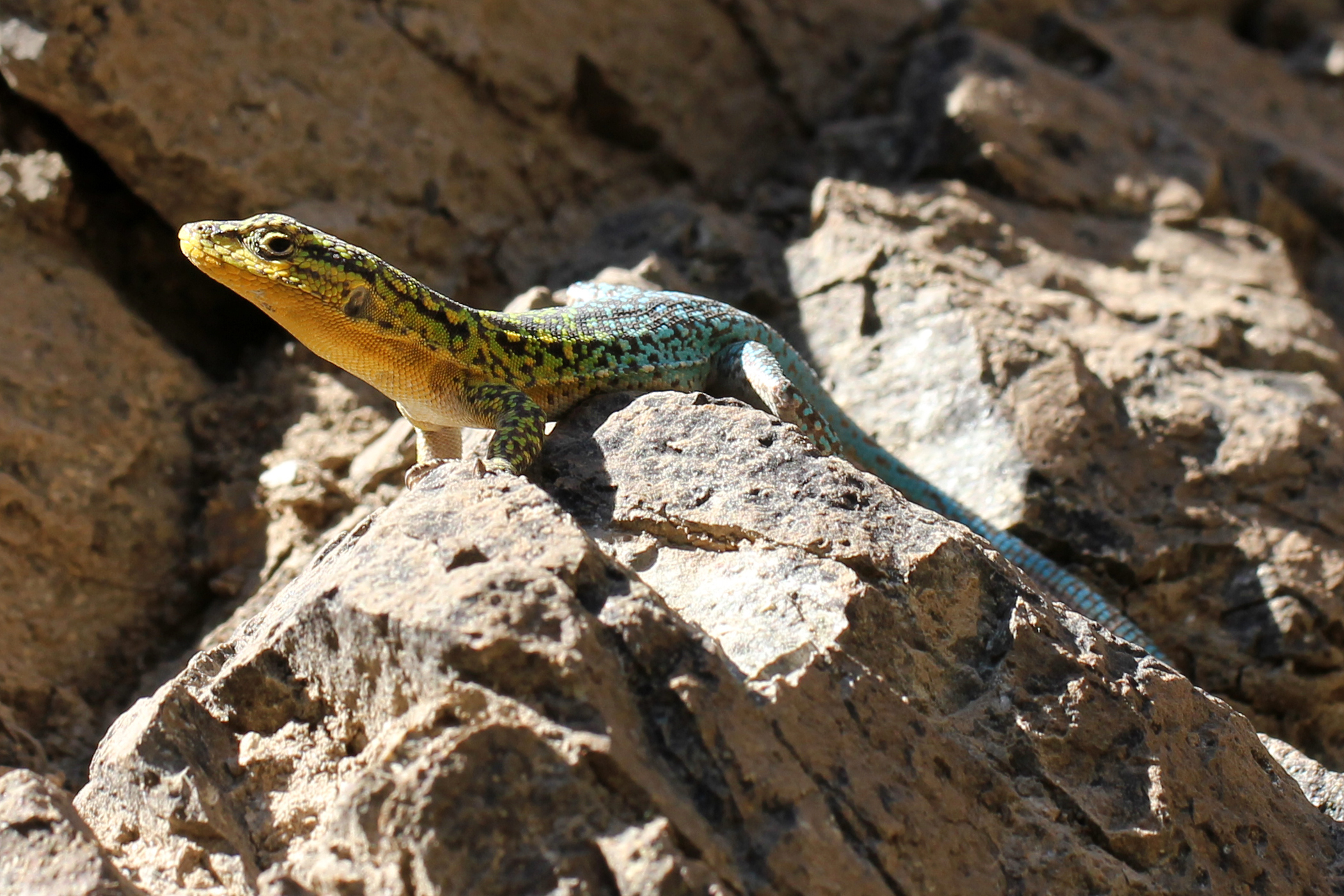
Liolaemus tenuis

There are more than 225 described species in the genus Liolaemus, but the true number of species may be about double this number. Liolaemus is by far the largest genus of the liolaemid lizards, which are traditionally treated as subfamily Liolaeminae within the Iguanidae but more recently were proposed for upranking to full family Liolaemidae.

The following species are recognised:

== A ==
- Liolaemus abaucan Etheridge, 1993
- Liolaemus abdalai Quinteros, 2012
- Liolaemus absconditus Vega, Quinteros, Stellatelli, Bellagamba, Block & Madrid, 2018
- Liolaemus acostai Abdala & Juárez-Heredia, 2013
- Liolaemus albiceps Lobo & Laurent, 1995
- Liolaemus alticolor Barbour, 1909
- Liolaemus andinus Koslowsky, 1895
- Liolaemus annectens Boulenger, 1901
- Liolaemus anomalus Koslowsky, 1896
- Liolaemus anqapuka Huamaní-Valderrama, Quiroz, Gutiérrez, Aguilar-Kirigin, Chaparro & Abdala, 2020
- Liolaemus antonietae Troncoso-Palacios, Esquerré, Urra, Díaz, Castro-Pastene & Ruiz, 2018
- Liolaemus antumalguen Ávila, Morando, D. Pérez & Sites, 2010
- Liolaemus aparicioi Ocampo, Aguilar-Kirigin & Quinteros, 2012
- Liolaemus arambarensis Verrastro, Veronese, Bujes & Martins Dias Filho, 2003
- Liolaemus araucaniensis L. Müller & Hellmich, 1932
- Liolaemus archeforus Donoso-Barros & Cei, 1971
- Liolaemus archipensis Huamaní-Valderram & Aguilar-Puntriano, 2026
- Liolaemus atacamensis L. Müller & Hellmich, 1933
- Liolaemus attenboroughi Sánchez, Morando & Ávila, 2023
- Liolaemus audituvelatus (Núñez & Yáñez, 1983)
- Liolaemus aureum Díaz-Vega, Maldonado & Demangel, 2018
- Liolaemus austromendocinus Cei, 1974
- Liolaemus avilae Breitman, Parra, C. Pérez & Sites, 2011
- Liolaemus azarai Ávila, 2003

== B ==
- Liolaemus baguali Cei & Scolaro, 1983
- Liolaemus balagueri Villegas-Paredes, Huamaní-Valderrama, Luque-Fernández, Gutiérrez, Quiróz & Abdala, 2020
- Liolaemus balerion Quinteros, Ruiz-Monachesi & Abdala, 2019
- Liolaemus basadrei Valladares-Faúndez, León, Chipana, Navarro Guzmán, Ignacio-Apaza, Musaja, Langstroth, Aguilar-Kirigin, Gutierrez & Abdala, 2021
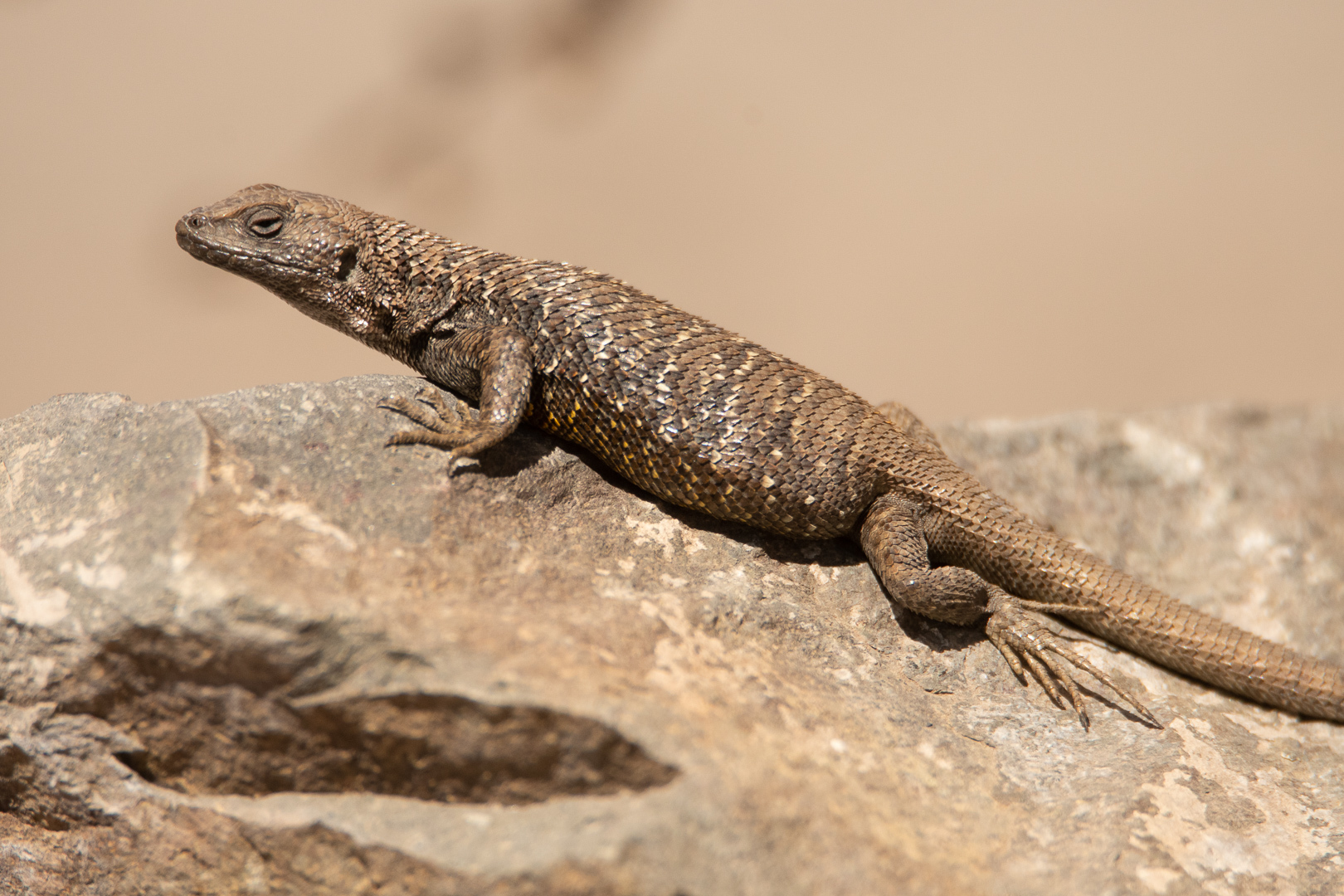
- Liolaemus bellii
  Liolaemus bellii Gray, 1845
- Liolaemus bibronii Bell, 1843
- Liolaemus bitaeniatus Laurent, 1984
- Liolaemus boulengeri Koslowsky, 1898
- Liolaemus brizuelai Fernández, Abdala, Ruiz-Monachesi, Semham & Quinteros, 2021
- Liolaemus buergeri Werner, 1907
- Liolaemus burmeisteri Ávila, C. Perez, Medina, Sites & Morando, 2012

== C ==
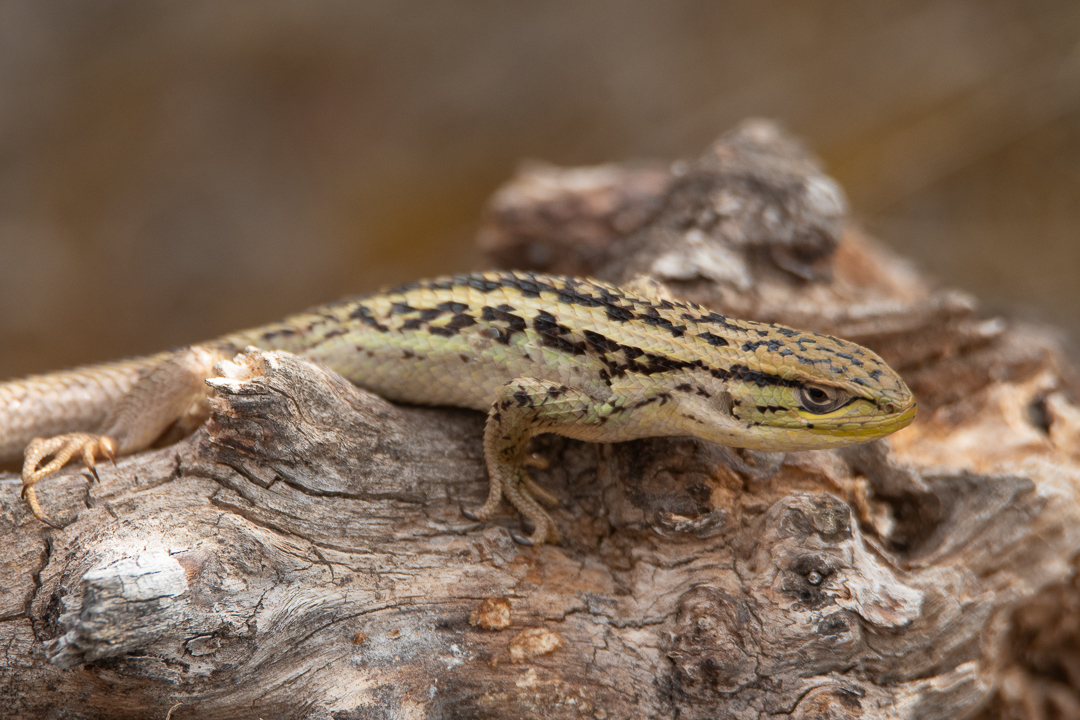
- Liolaemus chiliensis
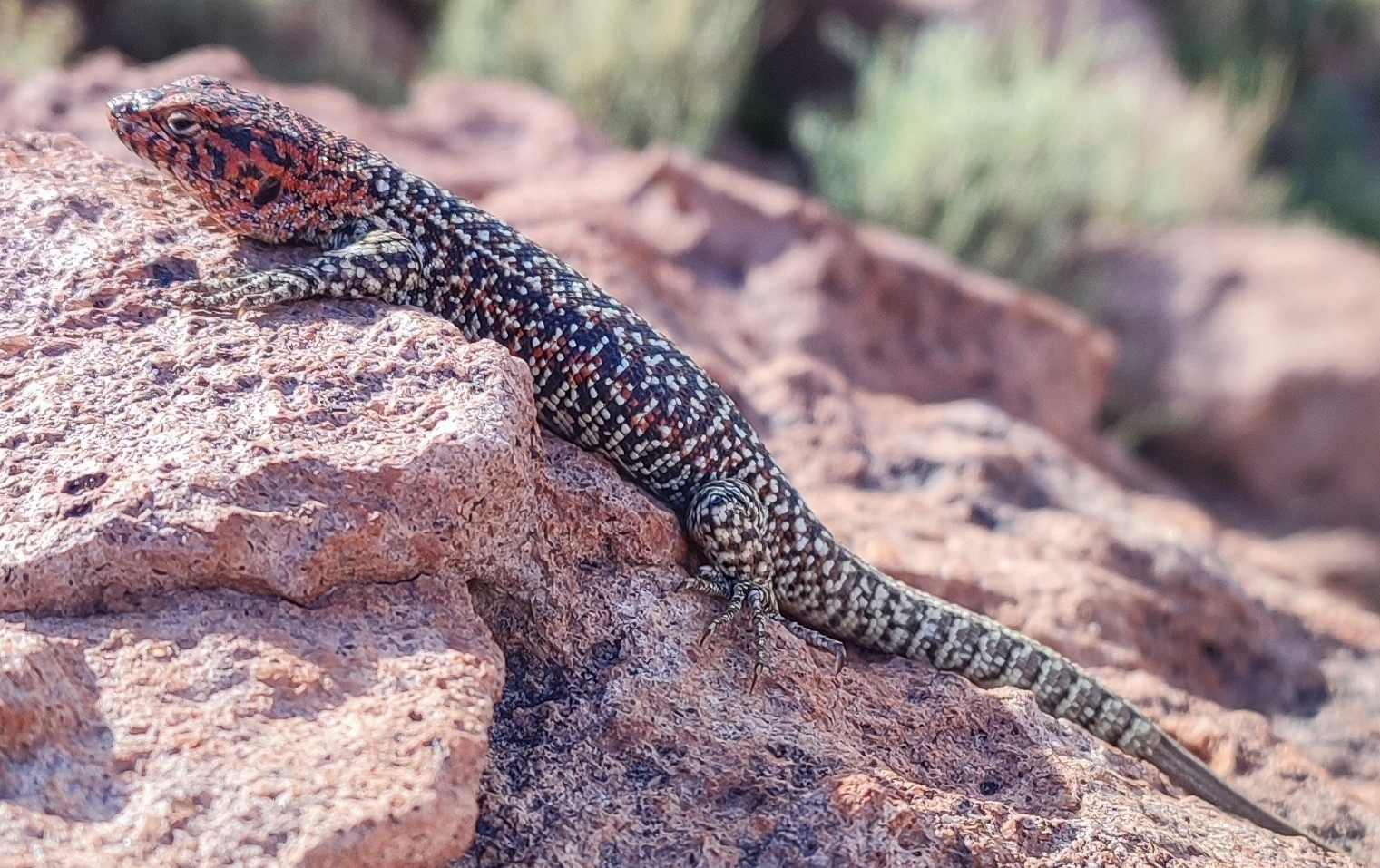
  Liolaemus constanzae
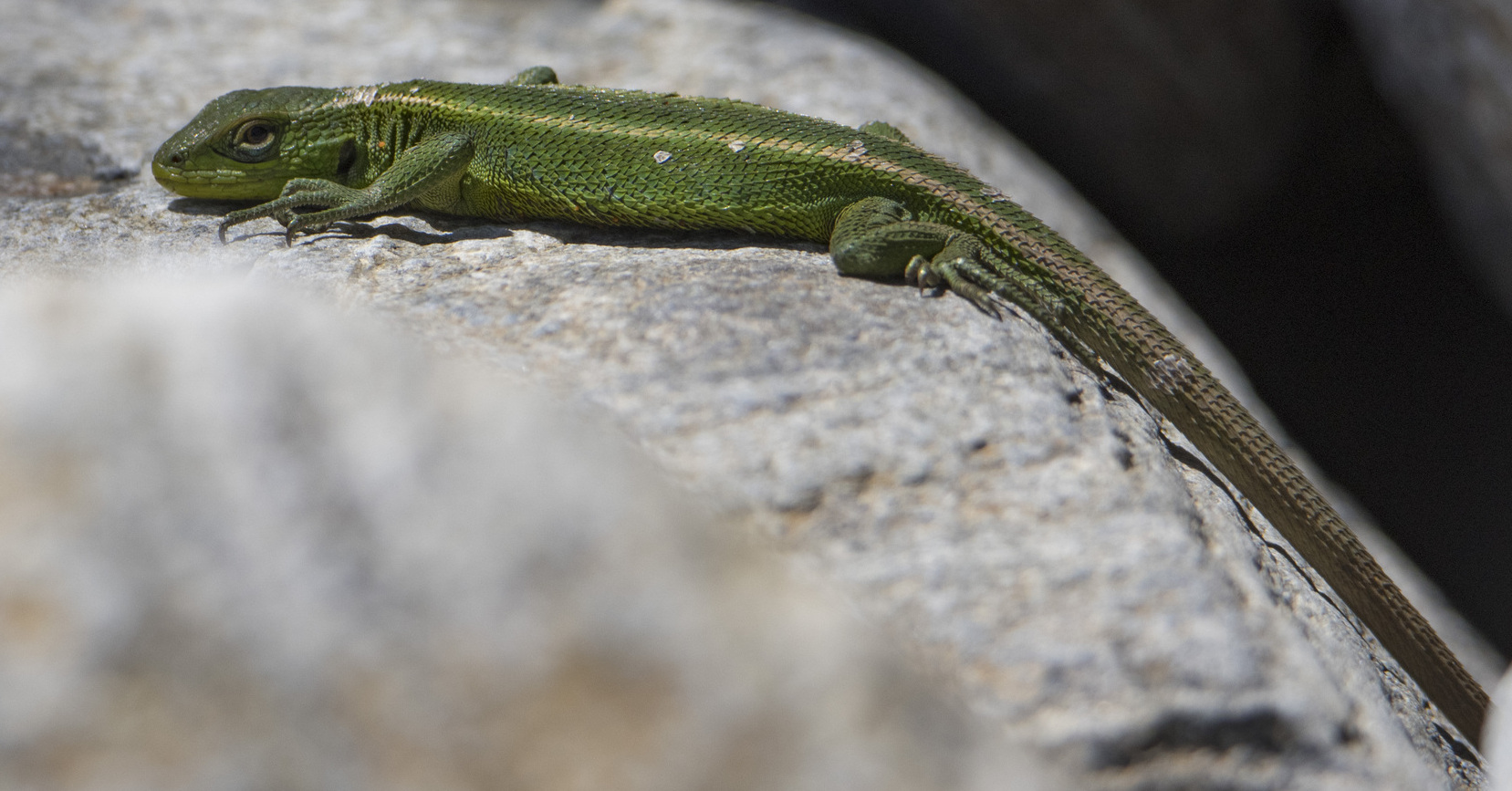
  Liolaemus cyanogaster
  Liolaemus calchaqui Lobo & Kretzschmar, 1996
- Liolaemus calliston Ávila, C. Perez, Minoli, Medina, Sites & Morando, 2017
- Liolaemus canqueli Cei, 1975
- Liolaemus caparensis Breitman, C. Pérez, Parra, Morando, Sites & Ávila, 2011
- Liolaemus capillitas Hulse, 1979
- Liolaemus carlosgarini Esquerre, Nunez & Scolaro, 2013
- Liolaemus casamiquelai Ávila, C. Perez, Morando & Sites, 2010
- Liolaemus cazianiae Lobo, Slodki & Valdecantos, 2010
- Liolaemus chacabucoense Núñez & Scolaro, 2009
- Liolaemus chacoensis Shreve, 1948
- Liolaemus chaltin Lobo & Espinoza, 2004
- Liolaemus chavin Aguilar, Wood, Cusi, Guzman, Huari, Lundberg, Mortensen, Ramí, Robles, Suárez, Ticona, Vargas, Venegas & Sites, 2013
- Liolaemus chehuachekenk Ávila, Morando & Sites, 2008
- Liolaemus chiliensis (Lesson, 1830)
- Liolaemus chillanensis Müller & Hellmich, 1932
- Liolaemus chiribaya Aguilar-Puntriano, Ramírez, Castillo, Mendoza, Vargas & Sites Jr., 2019
- Liolaemus chlorostictus Laurent, 1993
- Liolaemus chungara Quinteros, Valladares, Semham, Acosta, Barrionuevo & Abdala, 2014
- Liolaemus cinereus Monguillot, Cabrera, Acosta & Villavicencio, 2006
- Liolaemus coeruleus Cei & Ortiz-Zapata, 1983
- Liolaemus confusus Núñez & Pincheira-Donoso, 2006
- Liolaemus constanzae Donoso-Barros 1961
- Liolaemus crandalli Ávila, Medina, C. Perez, Sites & Morando, 2015
- Liolaemus cranwelli (Donoso-Barros, 1973)
- Liolaemus crepuscularis Abdala & Diaz Gómez, 2006
- Liolaemus cristiani Núñez, Navarro & Loyola, 1991
- Liolaemus curicensis Müller & Hellmich, 1938
- Liolaemus curis Núñez & Labra, 1985
- Liolaemus cuyanus Cei & Scolaro, 1980
- Liolaemus cuyumhue Ávila, Morando, D. Perez & Sites, 2009
- Liolaemus cyaneinotatus Martinez, Ávila, C. Perez, D. Perez, Sites & Morando, 2011
- Liolaemus cyanogaster (Duméril & Bibron, 1837)

== D ==
- Liolaemus darwinii Bell, 1843
- Liolaemus diaguita Abdala, Quinteros, Arias, Portelli & Palavecino, 2011
- Liolaemus dicktracyi Espinoza & Lobo, 2003
- Liolaemus disjunctus Laurent, 1990
- Liolaemus ditadai Cei, 1983
- Liolaemus donosobarrosi (Cei, 1974)
- Liolaemus dorbignyi Koslowsky, 1898
- Liolaemus duellmani Cei, 1978
- Liolaemus dumerili Abdala, Semhan, Moreno Azocar, Bonino, Paz & Cruz, 2012

== E ==
- Liolaemus eleodori Cei, Etheridge & Videla, 1985
- Liolaemus elongatus Koslowsky, 1896
- Liolaemus erguetae Laurent, 1995
- Liolaemus erroneus (Núñez & Yáñez, 1983)
- Liolaemus escarchadosi Scolaro, 1997
- Liolaemus espinozai Abdala, 2005
- Liolaemus etheridgei Laurent, 1998
- Liolaemus evaristoi Gutierrez, Chaparro, Vasquez, Quiroz, Aguilar-Kirgin & Abdala, 2018
- Liolaemus exploratorum Cei & Williams, 1984

== F ==
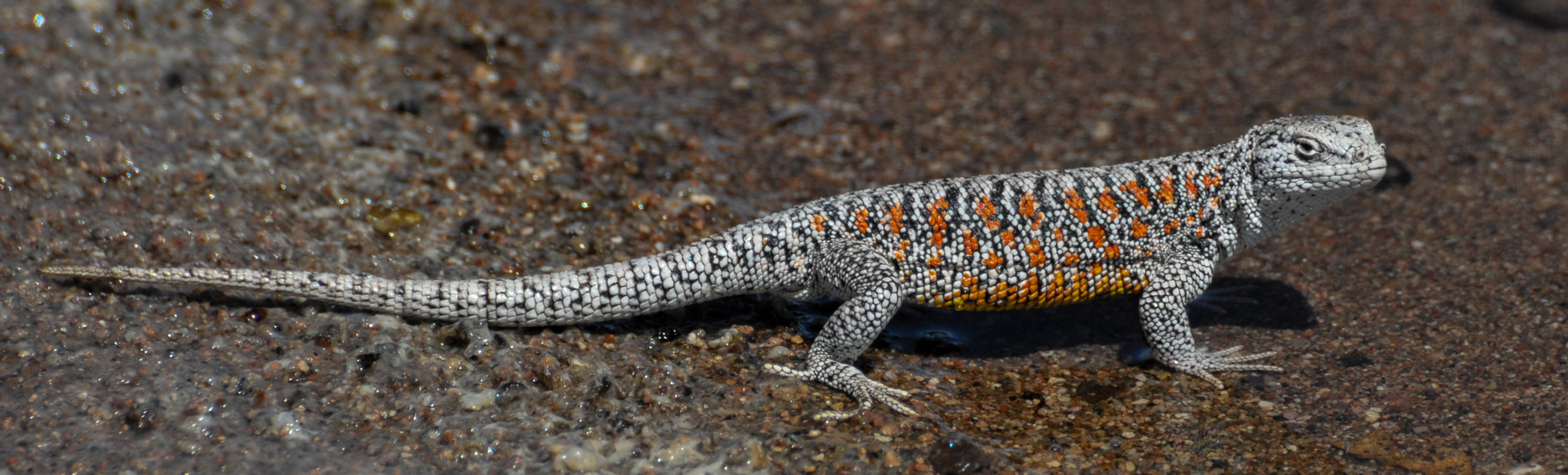
Liolaemus fabiani

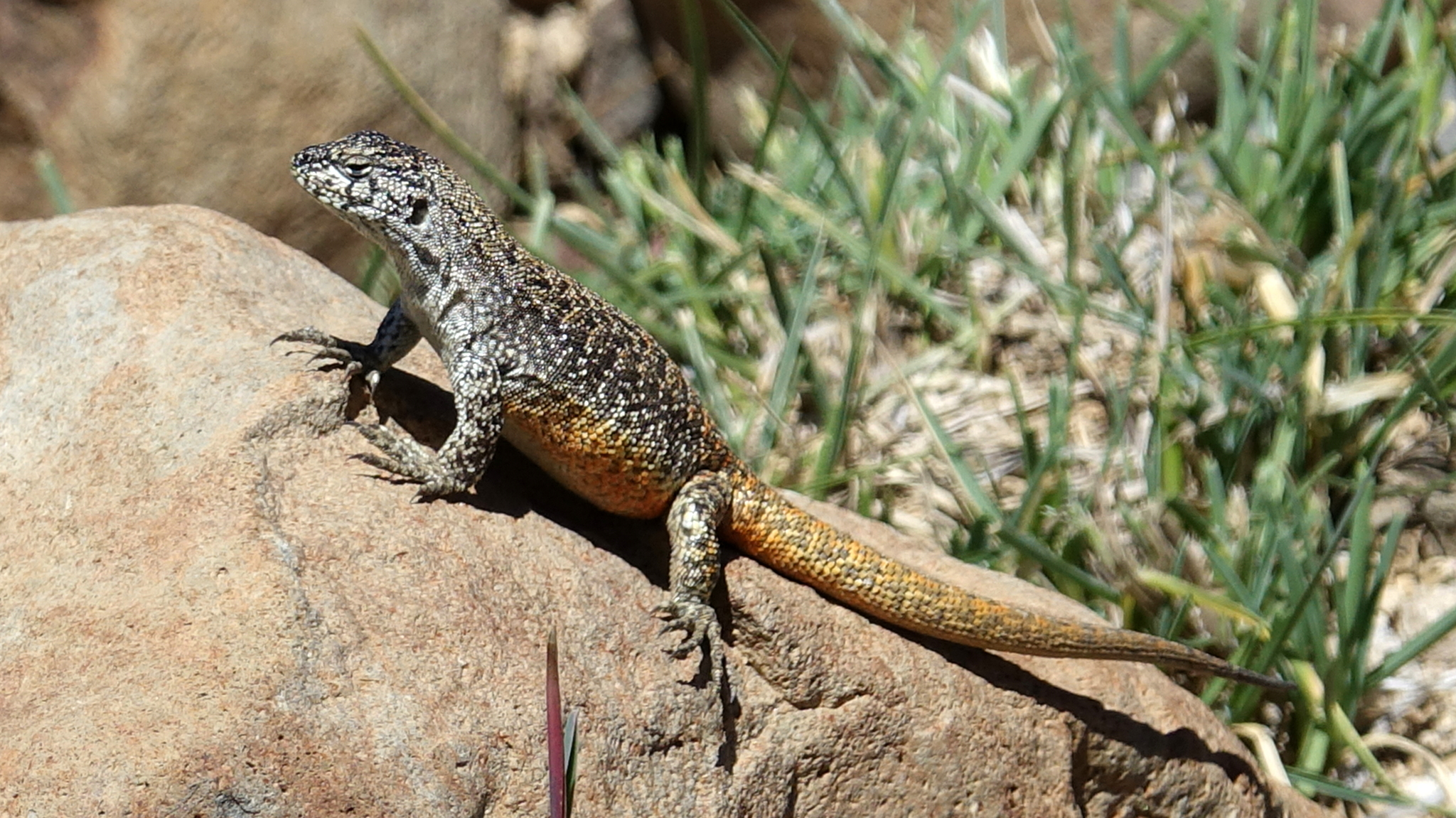
Liolaemus flavipiceus

- Liolaemus fabiani Yáñez & Núñez, 1983
- Liolaemus famatinae Cei, 1980
- Liolaemus fittkaui Laurent, 1986
- Liolaemus fitzgeraldi Boulenger, 1899
- Liolaemus fitzingerii (Duméril & Bibron, 1873)
- Liolaemus flavipiceus Cei & Videla, 2003
- Liolaemus forsteri Laurent, 1982
- Liolaemus foxi Núñez, Navarro & Veloso, 2000
- Liolaemus frassinettii Núñez, 2007
- Liolaemus fuscus Boulenger, 1885

== G ==
- Liolaemus galactostictos Ávila, Vrdoljak, Medina, Massini, C. Pérez, Sites & Morando, 2021
- Liolaemus gallardoi Cei & Scolaro, 1982
- Liolaemus gardeli Verrastro, Maneyro, Da Silva & Farias, 2017
- Liolaemus goetschi Müller & Hellmich, 1938
- Liolaemus gracielae Abdala, Acosta, Cabrera, Villavicencio & Marinero, 2009
- Liolaemus gracilis (Bell, 1843)
- Liolaemus gravenhorstii (Gray, 1845)
- Liolaemus griseus Laurent, 1984
- Liolaemus grosseorum Etheridge, 2001
- Liolaemus gununakuna Ávila, Morando, C. Perez & Sites, 2004

== H ==
- Liolaemus hajeki Núñez, Pincheira-Donoso & Garín, 2004
- Liolaemus halonastes Lobo, Slodki & Valdecantos, 2010
- Liolaemus hatcheri Stejneger, 1909
- Liolaemus hauthali Abdala, Díaz Gómez & Langstroth, 2021
- Liolaemus heliodermis Espinoza, Lobo & Cruz, 2000
- Liolaemus hellmichi Donoso-Barros, 1975
- Liolaemus hermannunezi Pincheira-Donoso, Scolaro & Schulte, 2007
- Liolaemus huacahuasicus Laurent, 1985
- Liolaemus huayra Abdala, Quinteros & Espinoza, 2008
- Liolaemus hugoi Bulacios-Arroyo, Semhan, Paz, Chafrat & Abdala, 2021

== I ==
- Liolaemus igneus Demangel, 2016
- Liolaemus inacayali Abdala, 2003
- Liolaemus incaicus Lobo, Quinteros & Gómez, 2007
- Liolaemus insolitus Cei, 1982
- Liolaemus inti Abdala, Quinteros & Espinoza, 2008
- Liolaemus irregularis Laurent, 1986
- Liolaemus isabelae Navarro & Núñez, 1993
- Liolaemus islugensis Ortiz & Marquet, 1987

== J ==
- Liolaemus jamesi Boulenger, 1891
- Liolaemus janequeoae Troncoso-Palacios, Diaz, Puas, Riveros-Riffo & Elorza, 2016
- Liolaemus josei Abdala, 2005
- Liolaemus juanortizi Young-Downey & Moreno, 1991

== K ==
- Liolaemus kingii (Bell, 1843)
- Liolaemus kolengh Abdala & Lobo, 2006
- Liolaemus koslowskyi Etheridge, 1993
- Liolaemus kriegi Müller & Hellmich, 1939
- Liolaemus kulinko Abdala, Chafrat, Chaparro, Procheret, Valdes, Lannutti, Perez & Quinteros, 2023
- Liolaemus kunza Abdala, Semhan & Paz, 2021

== L ==
- Liolaemus laurenti Etheridge, 1992
- Liolaemus lavillai Abdala & Lobo, 2006
- Liolaemus leftrarui Troncoso-Palacios, Diaz, Puas, Riveros-Riffo & Elorza, 2016
- Liolaemus lemniscatus Gravenhorst, 1837
- Liolaemus lentus Gallardo, 1966
- Liolaemus lenzi (Boettger, 1891)
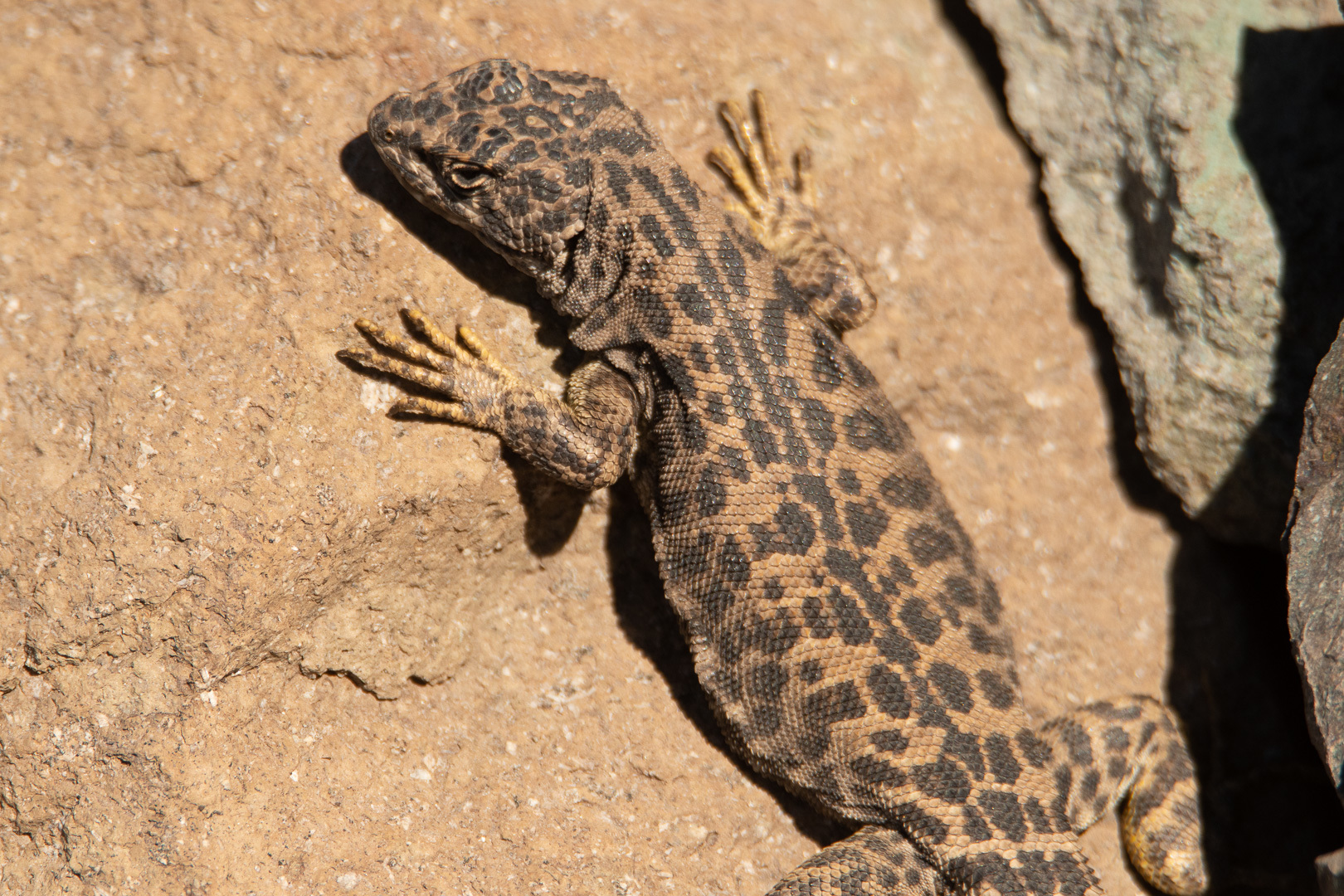
- Liolaemus leopardinus
  Liolaemus leopardinus Müller & Hellmich, 1932
- Liolaemus lineomaculatus Boulenger, 1885
- Liolaemus loboi Abdala, 2003
- Liolaemus lonquimayensis Escobar-Huerta, Santibanez-Toro & Ortiz, 2015
- Liolaemus lopezi Ibarra-Vidal, 2005
- Liolaemus lorenzmuelleri Hellmich, 1950
- Liolaemus lutzae Mertens, 1938

== M ==
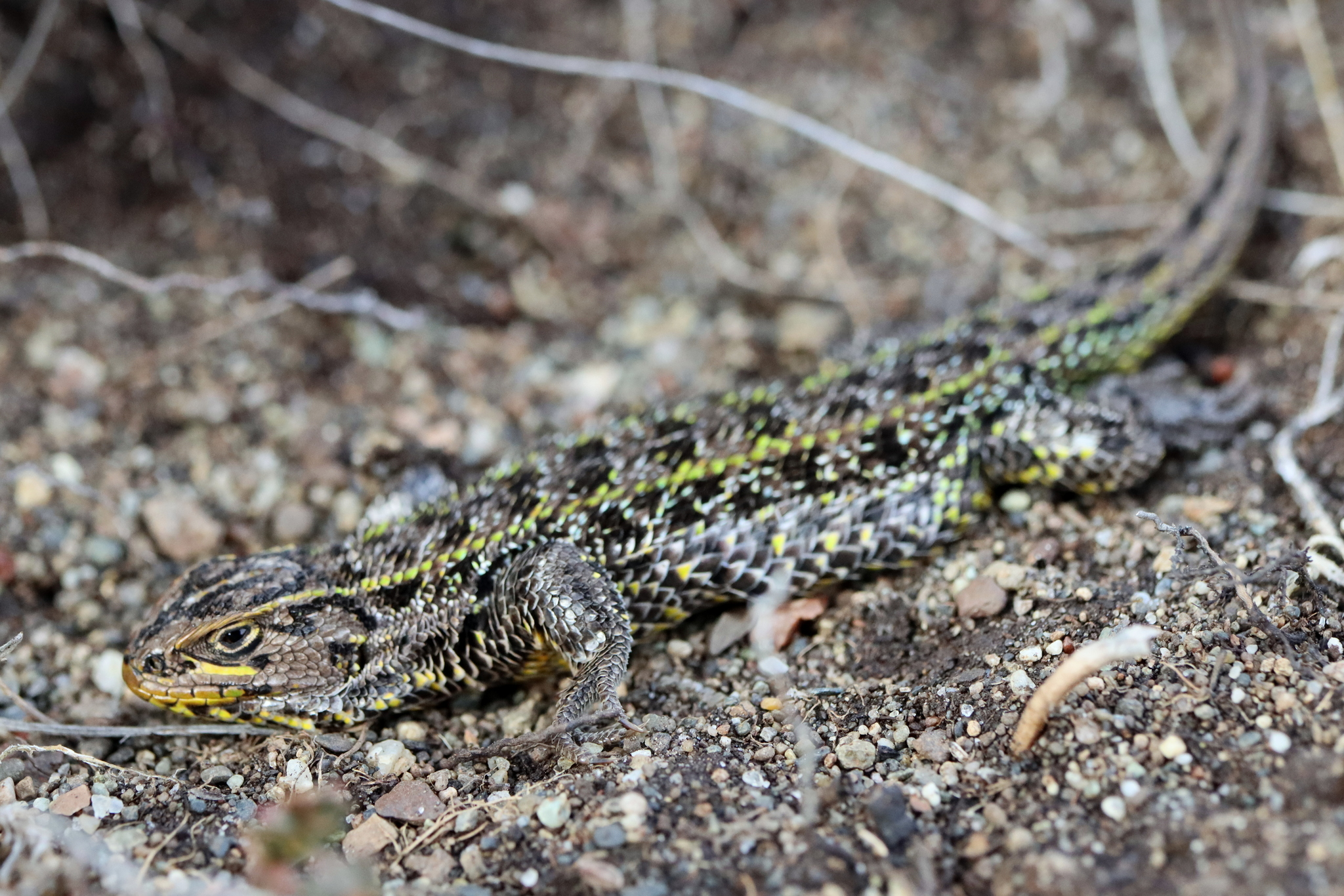
Liolaemus magellanicus

- Liolaemus magellanicus Hombron & Jacquinot, 1847
- Liolaemus maldonadae Navarro & Núñez, 1991
- Liolaemus mapuche Abdala, 2002
- Liolaemus martorii Abdala, 2003
- Liolaemus melaniceps Pincheira-Donoso & Núñez, 2005
- Liolaemus melanogaster Laurent, 1998
- Liolaemus melanopleurus (Philippi, 1860)
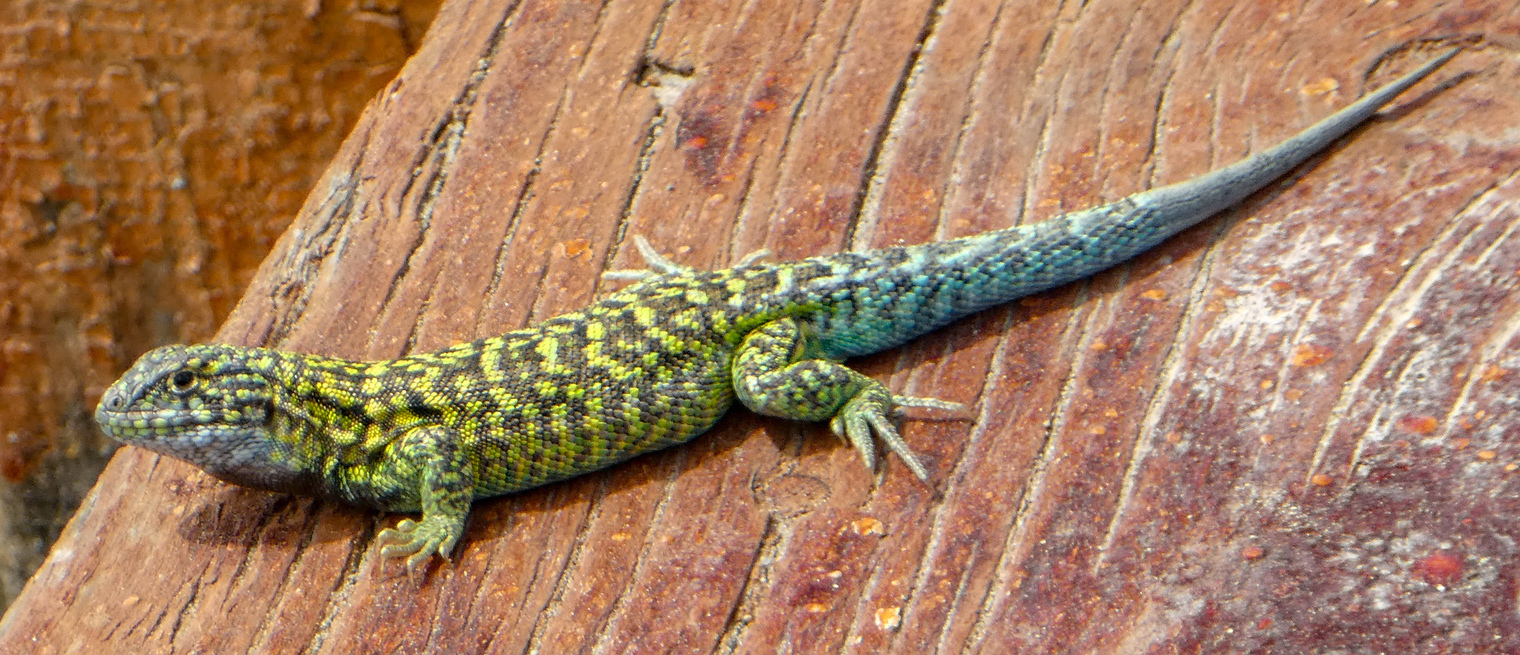
- Liolaemus melanops
  Liolaemus melanops Burmeister, 1888
- Liolaemus meraxes Quinteros, Ruiz-Monachesi & Abdala, 2019
- Liolaemus messii Ruiz, Quipildor, Ruiz-Monachesi, Escalante, Valdecantos & Lobo, 2021
- Liolaemus millcayac Abdala & Juárez-Heredia, 2013
- Liolaemus molinai Valladares, Etheridge, Schulte, Manriquez & Spotorno, 2002
- Liolaemus montanezi Cabrera & Monguillot, 2006
- Liolaemus montanus Koslowsky, 1898
- Liolaemus monticola Müller & Hellmich, 1932
- Liolaemus moradoensis Hellmich, 1950
- Liolaemus morandae Breitman, Parra, C. Pérez & Sites, 2011
- Liolaemus morenoi Etheridge & Christie, 2003
- Liolaemus multicolor Koslowsky, 1898
- Liolaemus multiformis (Cope, 1875)
- Liolaemus multimaculatus (Duméril & Bibron, 1837)

== N ==
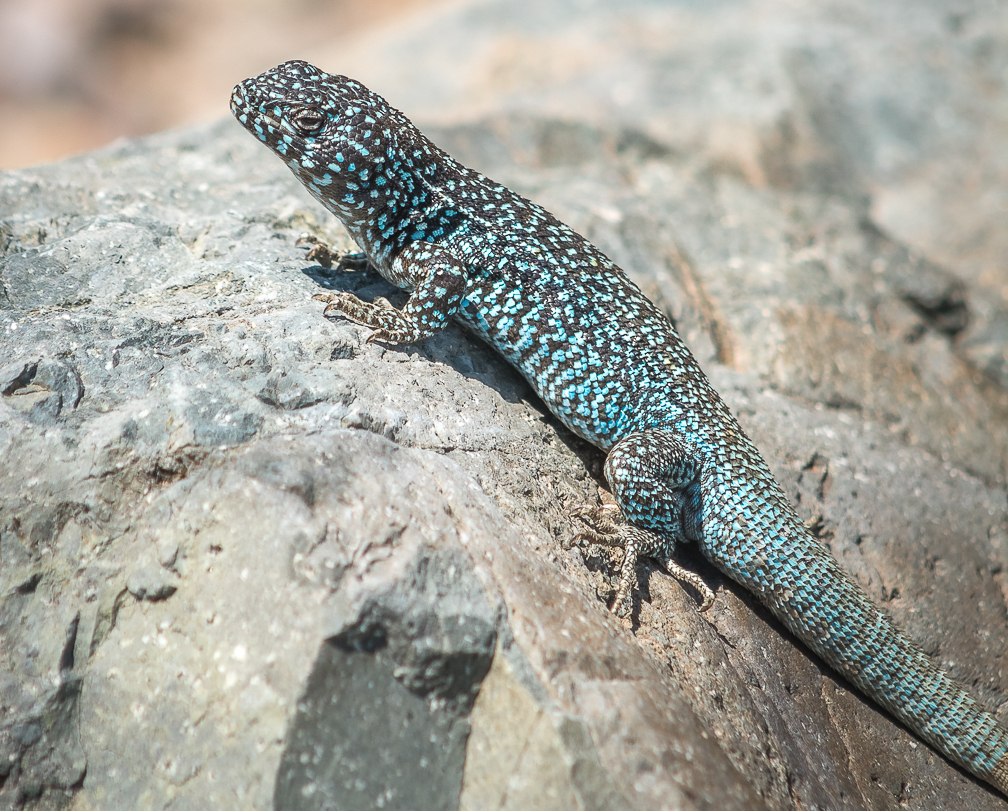
- Liolaemus nigroviridis
  Liolaemus nazca Aguilar-Puntriano, Ramírez, Castillo, Mendoza, Vargas & Sites Jr., 2019
- Liolaemus neuquensis Müller & Hellmich, 1939
- Liolaemus nigriceps (Philippi, 1860)
- Liolaemus nigromaculatus Weigmann, 1834
- Liolaemus nigroviridis Müller & Hellmich, 1932
- Liolaemus nitidus (Wiegmann, 1834)
- Liolaemus normae Esquerré, Ramírez-Álvarez, Pavón-Vázquez, Troncoso-Palacios, Garín, Keogh & Leaché, 2019

== O ==
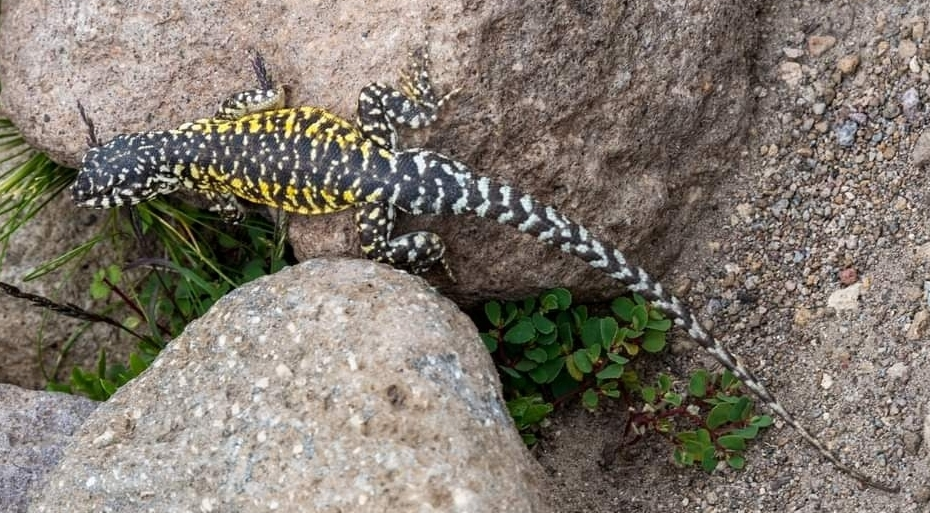
Liolaemus ornatus

- Liolaemus occipitalis Boulenger, 1885
- Liolaemus olongasta Etheridge, 1993
- Liolaemus omorfi Demangel, Sepulveda, Jara, Pincheira-Donoso & Nunez, 2015
- Liolaemus orko Abdala & Quinteros, 2008
- Liolaemus ornatus Koslowsky, 1898
- Liolaemus ortizii Laurent, 1982

== P ==
- Liolaemus pacha Juárez Heredia, Robles & Halloy, 2013
- Liolaemus pachacutec Aguilar, Wood, Cusi, Guzman, Huari, Lundberg, Mortensen, Ramí, Robles, Suárez, Ticona, Vargas, Venegas & Sites, 2013
- Liolaemus pachecoi Laurent, 1995
- Liolaemus pagaburoi Lobo & Espinoza, 1999
- Liolaemus pantherinus Pellegrin, 1909
- Liolaemus parthenos Abdala, Baldo, Juarez & Espinoza, 2016
- Liolaemus parvus Quinteros, Abdala, Gómez & Scrocchi, 2008
- Liolaemus patriciaiturrae Navarro & Núñez, 1993
- Liolaemus paulinae Donoso-Barros, 1961
- Liolaemus petrophilus Donoso-Barros & Cei, 1971
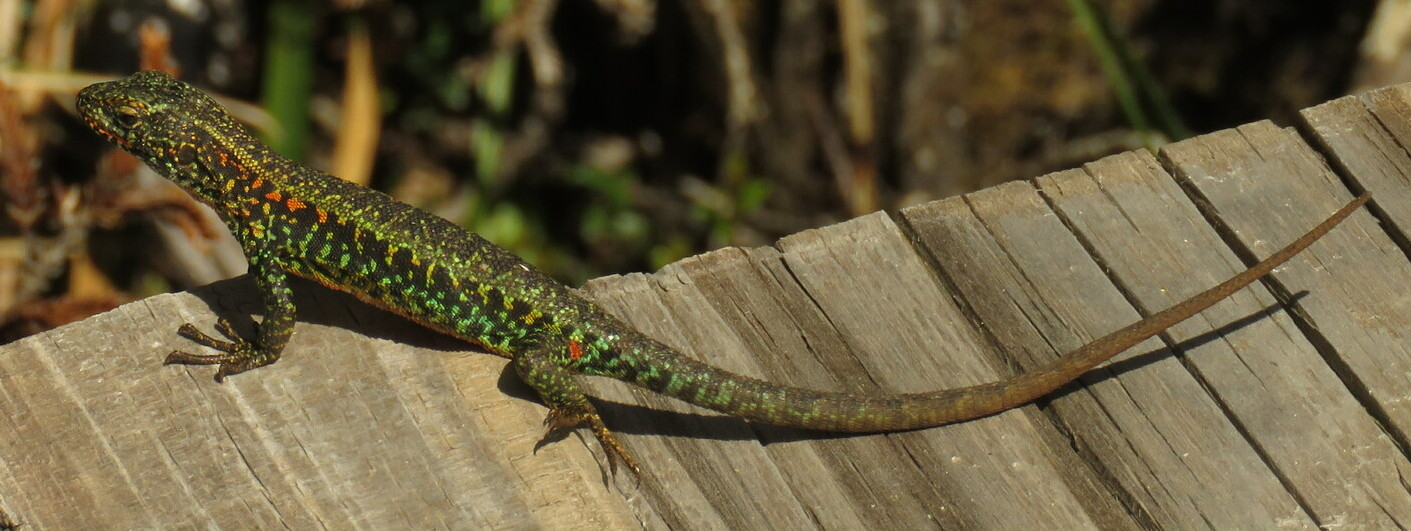
- Liolaemus pictus
  Liolaemus pictus (Duméril & Bibron, 1837)
- Liolaemus pikunche Troncoso-Palacios & Ramírez-Álvarez, 2021
- Liolaemus pipanaco Abdala & Juárez-Heredia, 2013
- Liolaemus platei Werner, 1898
- Liolaemus pleopholis Laurent, 1998
- Liolaemus poconchilensis Valladares, 2004
- Liolaemus poecilochromus Laurent, 1986
- Liolaemus polystictus Laurent, 1992
- Liolaemus porosus Abdala, Paz & Semhan, 2013
- Liolaemus pseudoanomalus Cei, 1981
- Liolaemus pseudolemniscatus Lamborot & Ortiz, 1990
- Liolaemus puelche Ávila, Morando, C. Perez & Sites, 2007
- Liolaemus pulcherrimus Laurent, 1992
- Liolaemus puna Lobo & Espinoza, 2004
- Liolaemus punmahuida Ávila, C. Perez & Morando, 2003
- Liolaemus puritamensis Núñez & Fox, 1989
- Liolaemus purul Abdala, Semhan, Moreno Azócar, Bonino, Paz & Cruz, 2012
- Liolaemus pyriphlogos Quinteros, 2012

== Q ==
- Liolaemus qalaywa Chaparro, Quiroz, Mamani, Gutiérrez, Condori, De la Riva, Herrera-Juárez, Cerdeña, Arapa & Abdala, 2020
- Liolaemus quilmes Etheridge, 1993
- Liolaemus quinterosi Ruiz, Quipildor, Bulacios-Arroyo, Chafrat & Abdala, 2019

== R ==
- Liolaemus rabinoi (Cei, 1974)
- Liolaemus ramirezae Lobo & Espinoza, 1999
- Liolaemus reichei (Werner, 1907)
- Liolaemus riojanus (Cei, 1979)
- Liolaemus robertmertensi Hellmich, 1964
- Liolaemus robertoi Pincheira-Donoso & Núñez, 2004
- Liolaemus robustus Laurent, 1992
- Liolaemus rosenmanni Núñez & Navarro, 1992
- Liolaemus rothi Koslowsky, 1898
- Liolaemus ruibali Donoso-Barros, 1961

== S ==
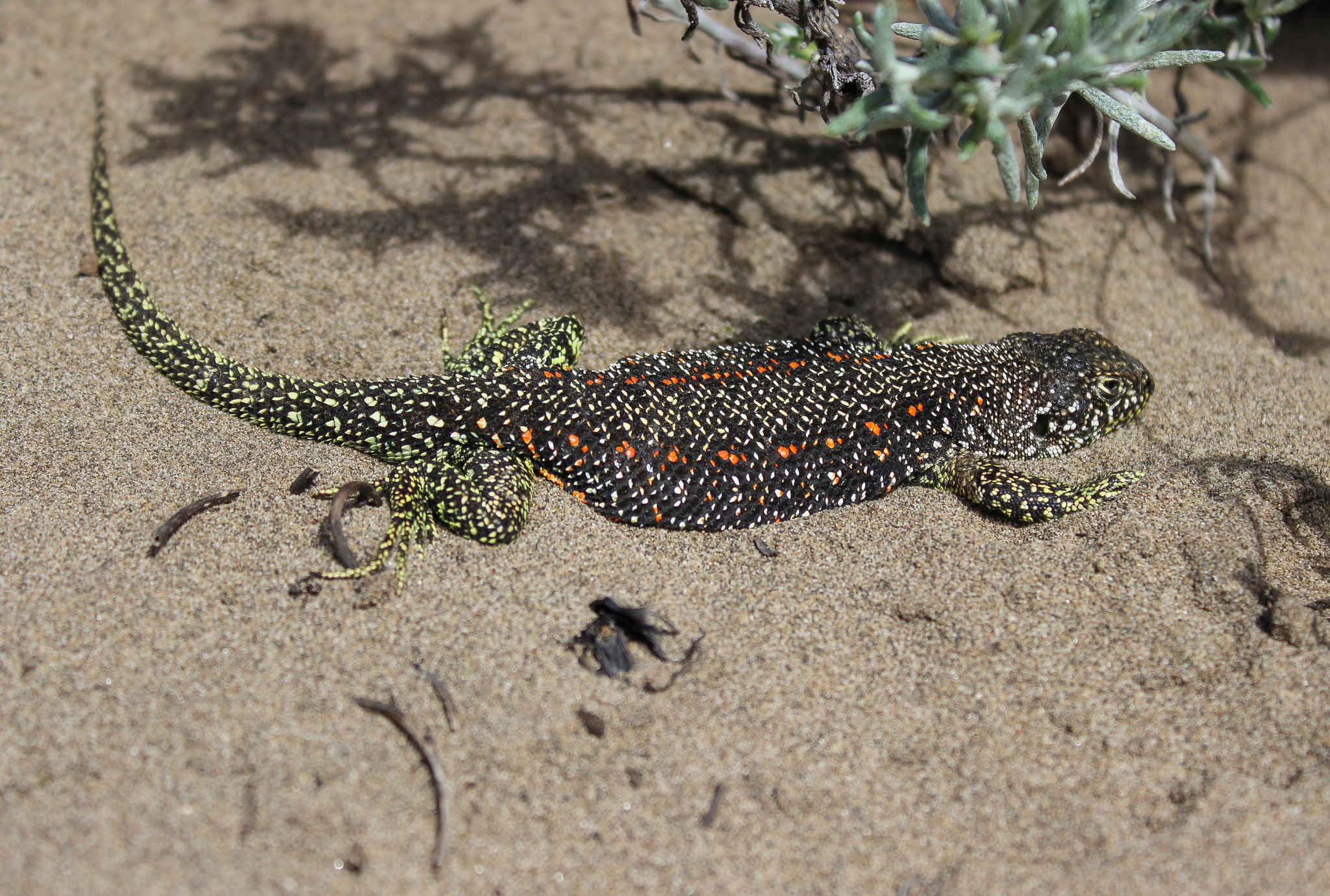
Liolaemus sarmientoi

- Liolaemus sagei Etheridge & Christie, 2003
- Liolaemus salinicola Laurent, 1986
- Liolaemus salitrosus Abdala, Paz, Semhan, García, Aguilar-Kirigin, Farías, Valladares, Poblete, Quipildor, Valdes & Langstroth, 2021
- Liolaemus sanjuanensis Cei, 1982
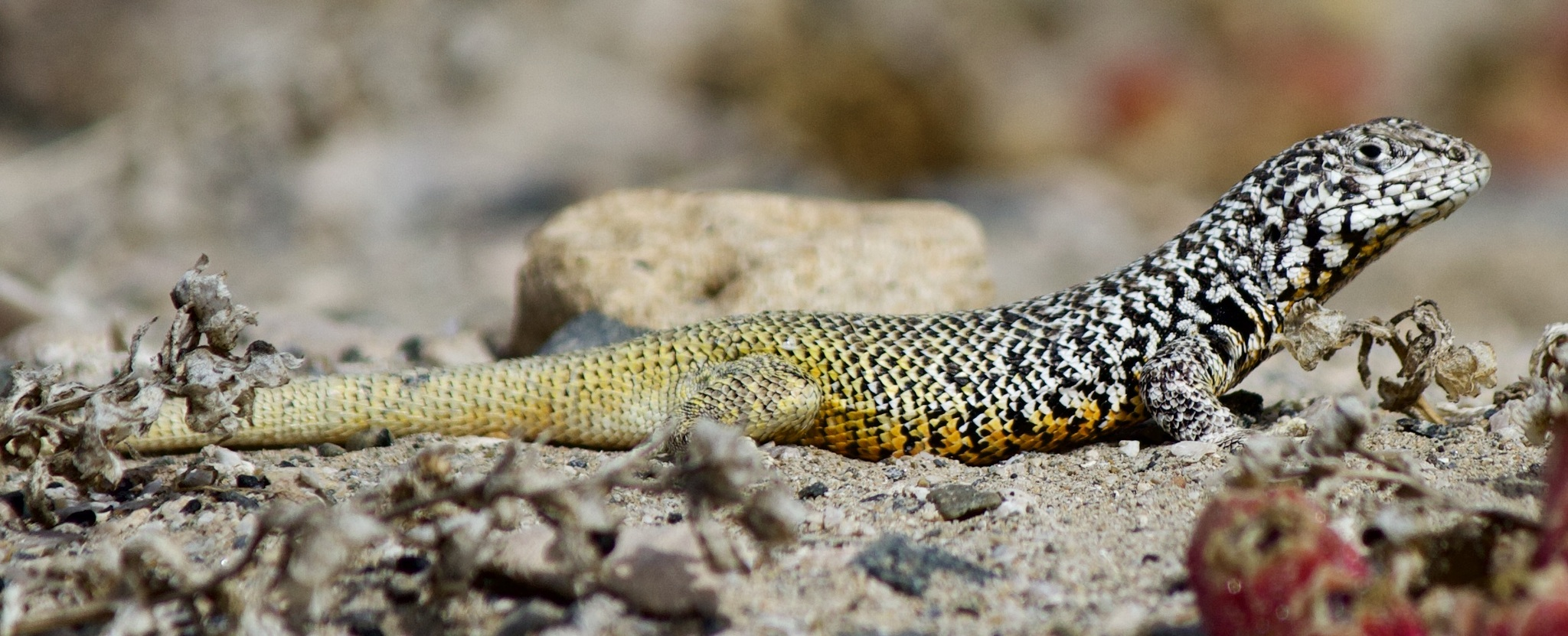
- Liolaemus silvai
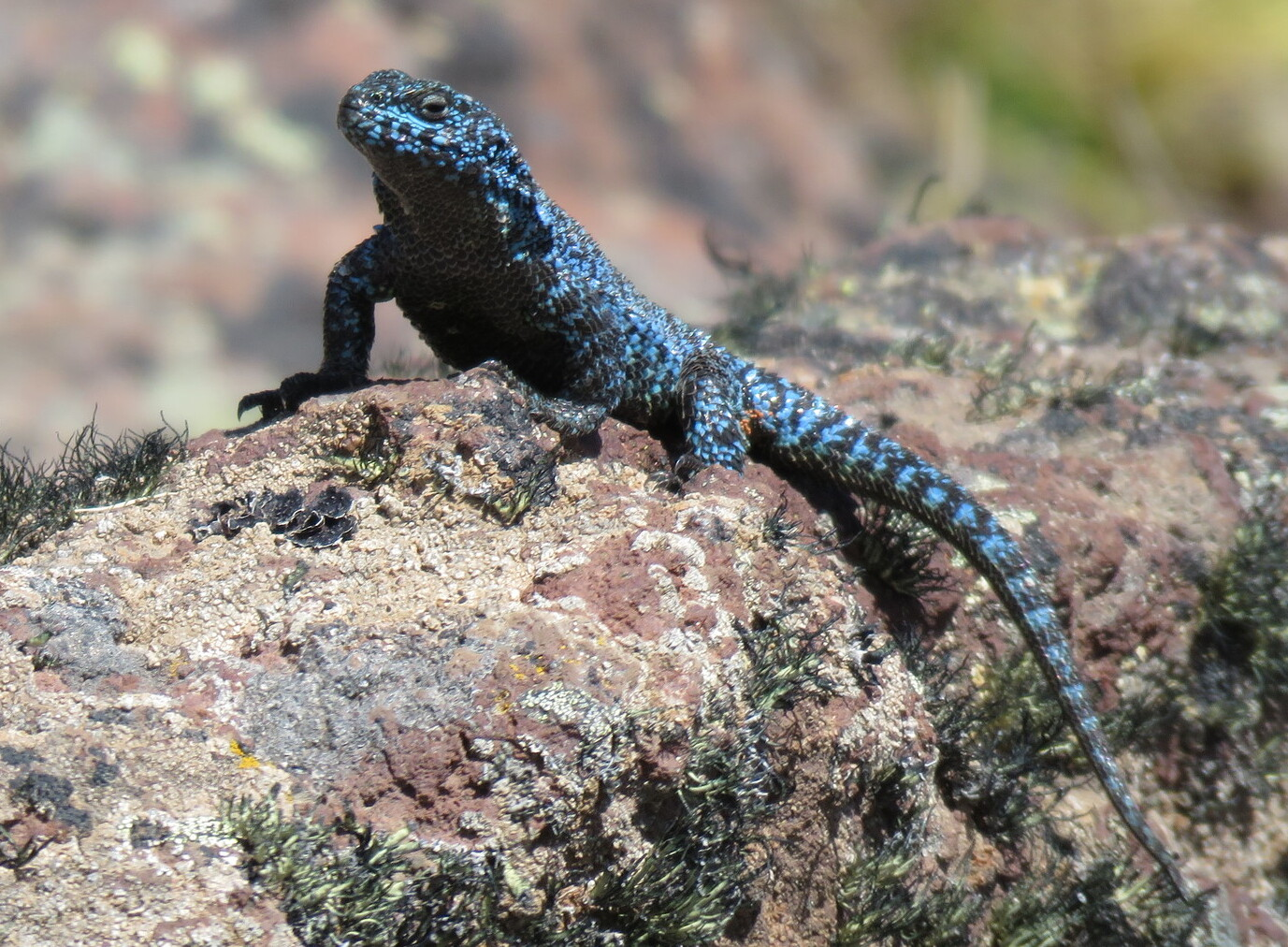
  Liolaemus silvanae
  Liolaemus sarmientoi Donoso-Barros, 1973
- Liolaemus saxatilis Ávila, Cei, Martori & Acosta, 1992
- Liolaemus scapularis Laurent, 1982
- Liolaemus schmidti (Marx, 1960)
- Liolaemus schroederi Müller & Hellmich, 1938
- Liolaemus scolaroi Pincheira-Donoso & Núñez, 2005
- Liolaemus scorialis Troncoso-Palacios, Diaz, Esquerre & Urra, 2015
- Liolaemus scrocchii Quinteros, Abdala & Lobo, 2008
- Liolaemus senguer Abdala, 2005
- Liolaemus septentrionalis Pincheira-Donoso & Núñez, 2005
- Liolaemus shehuen Abdala, Díaz-Gómez & Juarez-Heredia, 2012
- Liolaemus shitan Abdala, Quinteros, Scrocchi & Stazzonelli, 2010
- Liolaemus signifer (Duméril & Bibron, 1837)
- Liolaemus silvai Ortiz, 1989
- Liolaemus silvanae (Donoso-Barros & Cei, 1971)
- Liolaemus sitesi Ávila, Olave, C. Perez, D. Perez & Morando, 2013
- Liolaemus smaug Abdala, Quinteros, Scrocchi & Stazzonelli, 2010
- Liolaemus somuncurae Cei & Scolaro, 1981
- Liolaemus stolzmanni (Steindachner, 1891)

== T ==
- Liolaemus tacnae (Shreve, 1941)
- Liolaemus tacora Demangel, 2016
- Liolaemus tajzara Aguilar-Kirigin, 2019
- Liolaemus talampaya Ávila, Morando, C. Perez & Sites, 2004
- Liolaemus tandiliensis Vega, Bellagamba & Lobo, 2008
- Liolaemus tari Scolaro & Cei, 1997
- Liolaemus tehuelche Abdala, 2003
- Liolaemus telsen Cei & Scolaro, 1999
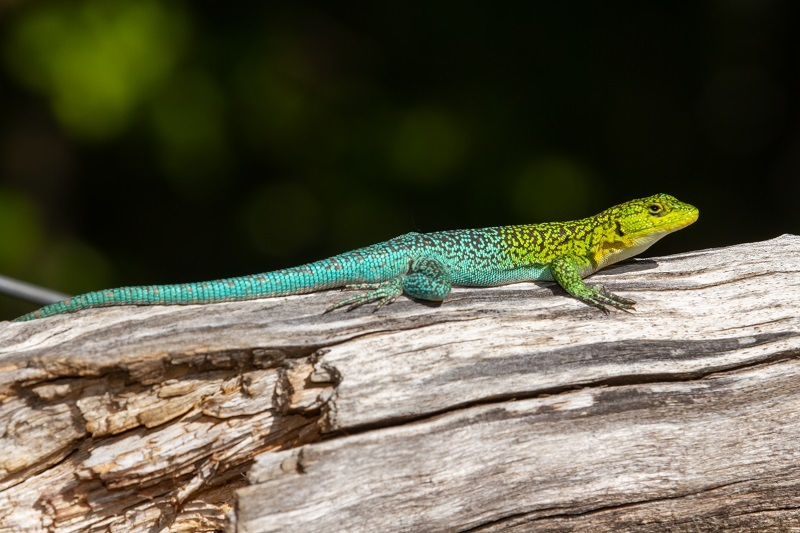
  Liolaemus tenuis
- Liolaemus tenuis (Duméril & Bibron, 1837)
- Liolaemus terani Abdala, Díaz Gómez & Langstroth, 2021
- Liolaemus thermarum Videla & Cei, 1996
- Liolaemus thomasi Laurent, 1998
- Liolaemus tirantii Ávila, C. Perez, Minoli, Medina, Sites & Morando, 2017
- Liolaemus tolhuaca Demangel, 2016
- Liolaemus torresi Núñez, Navarro, Garín, Pincheira-Donoso,& Meriggio, 2003
- Liolaemus tregenzai Pincheira-Donoso & Scolaro, 2007
- Liolaemus tristis Scolaro & Cei, 1997
- Liolaemus tromen Abdala, Semhan, Moreno Azocar, Bonino, Paz & Cruz, 2012
- Liolaemus tulkas Quinteros, Abdala, Gómez & Scrocchi, 2008

== U ==
- Liolaemus ubaghsi Esquerré, Troncoso-Palacios, Garín & Núñez, 2014
- Liolaemus umbrifer Espinoza & Lobo, 2003
- Liolaemus uniformis Troncoso-Palacios, Elorza, Puas & Alfaro-Pardo, 2016
- Liolaemus uptoni Scolari & Cei, 2006
- Liolaemus uspallatensis Macola & Castro, 1982

== V ==
- Liolaemus valdesianus Hellmich, 1950
- Liolaemus vallecurensis Pereyra, 1992
- Liolaemus variegatus Laurent, 1984
- Liolaemus velosoi Ortiz, 1987
- Liolaemus vhagar Quinteros, Ruiz-Monachesi & Abdala, 2019
- Liolaemus victormoralesii Aguilar-Puntriano, Ramírez, Castillo, Mendoza, Vargas & Sites, 2019
- Liolaemus villaricensis Müller & Hellmich, 1932
- Liolaemus vulcanus Quinteros & Abdala, 2011

== W ==
- Liolaemus walkeri Shreve, 1938
- Liolaemus wari Aguilar, Wood, Cusi, Guzman, Huari, Lundberg, Mortensen, Ramí, Robles, Suárez, Ticona, Vargas, Venegas & Sites, 2013
- Liolaemus warjantay Ubalde-Mamani, Gutiérrez, Chaparro, Aguilar-Kirigin, Cerdeña, Huanca-Mamani, Cárdenas-Ninasivincha, Lazo-Rivera & Abdala, 2021
- Liolaemus wiegmannii (Duméril & Bibron, 1837)
- Liolaemus williamsi Laurent, 1992

== X ==
- Liolaemus xanthoviridis Cei & Scolaro, 1980

== Y ==
- Liolaemus yalguaraz Abdala, Quinteros & Semham, 2015
- Liolaemus yanalcu Martínez Oliver & Lobo, 2002
- Liolaemus yarabamba Quiroz, Huamaní-Valderrama, Gutiérrez, Aguilar-Kirigin, Chaparro & Abdala, 2021
- Liolaemus yatel Abdala, Procopio, Stellatelli, Travaini, Rodríguez & Monachesi, 2014
- Liolaemus yauri Arapa-Aquino, Abdala, Huamaní-Valderrama, Gutiérrez, Sardinia, Quiroz & Chaparro, 2021

== Z ==
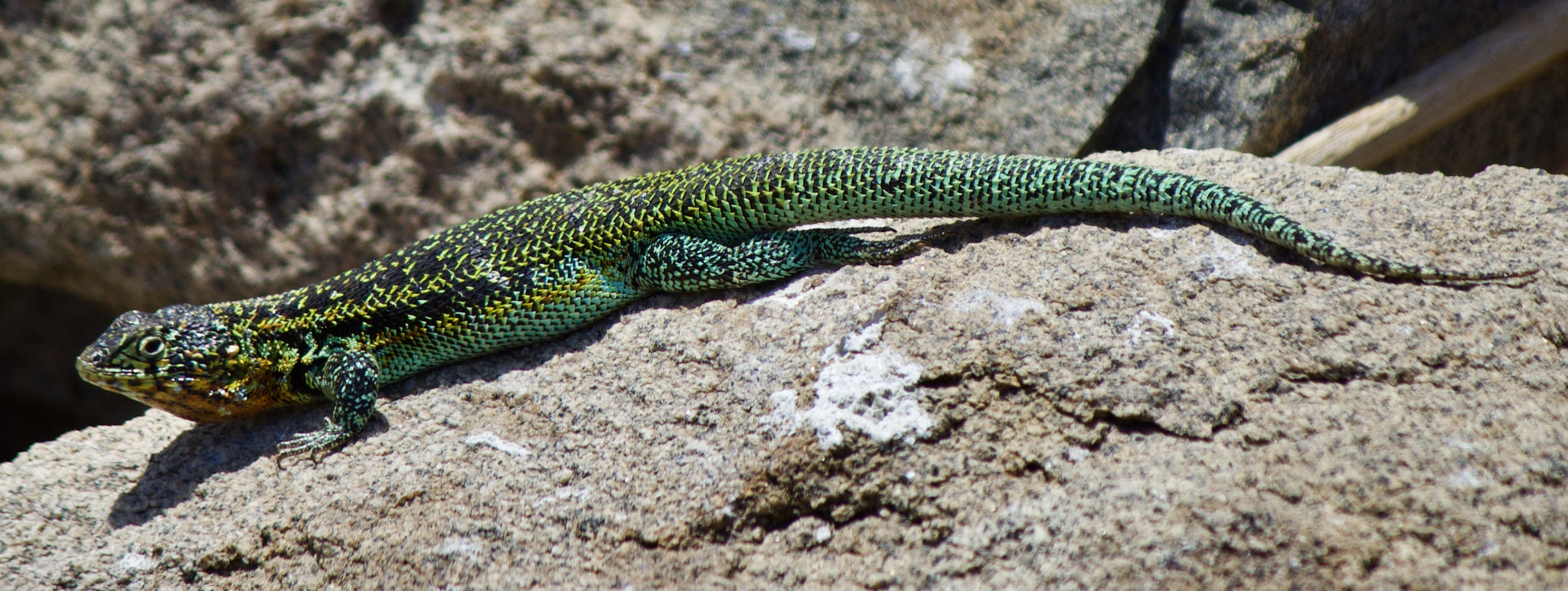
Liolaemus zapallarensis

- Liolaemus zabalai Troncoso-Palacios, Diaz, Esquerre & Urra, 2015
- Liolaemus zapallarensis (Müller & Hellmich, 1933)
- Liolaemus zullyi Cei & Scolaro, 1996
