= Liolaemus parthenos =

Scientific classification
- Kingdom: Animalia
- Phylum: Chordata
- Class: Reptilia
- Order: Squamata
- Suborder: Iguania
- Family: Liolaemidae
- Genus: Liolaemus
- Species: L. parthenos

Binomial name
- Liolaemus parthenos Abdala, Baldo, Juarez, & Espinoza, 2016

Species of lizard

Liolaemus parthenos is a species of lizard in the family Liolaemidae. It is endemic to Argentina.
