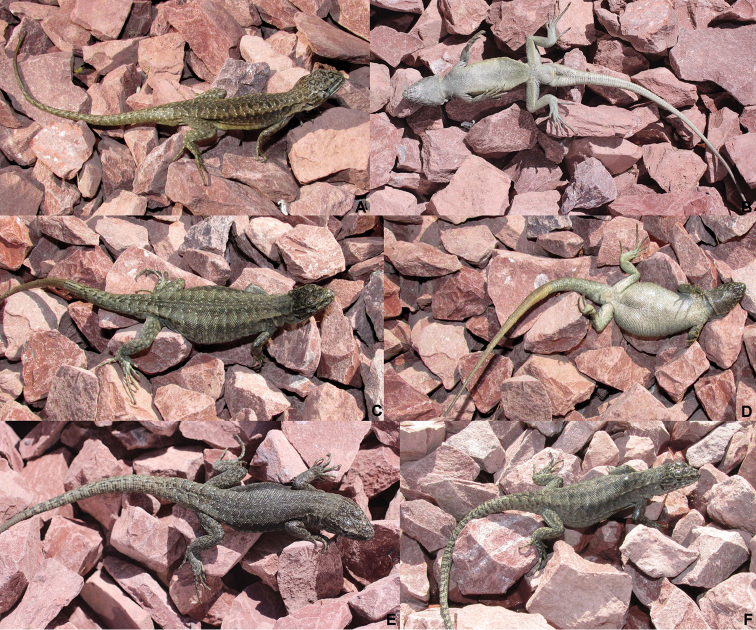

Scientific classification
- Kingdom: Animalia
- Phylum: Chordata
- Class: Reptilia
- Order: Squamata
- Suborder: Iguania
- Family: Liolaemidae
- Genus: Liolaemus
- Species: L. scorialis

Binomial name
- Liolaemus scorialis Troncoso-Palacios, Díaz, Esquerré, & Urra, 2015

= Liolaemus scorialis =

Species of lizard

Liolaemus scorialis, the slag lizard, is a species of lizard in the family Liolaemidae. It is native to Chile and was discovered in 2015.

The species name derives from its habitat, characterized by deposits of igneous rock from the Antuco Volcano known as "scoria", from the Greek word "skoria".
