= Liolaemus yarabamba =

Scientific classification
- Kingdom: Animalia
- Phylum: Chordata
- Class: Reptilia
- Order: Squamata
- Suborder: Iguania
- Family: Liolaemidae
- Genus: Liolaemus
- Species: L. yarabamba

Binomial name
- Liolaemus yarabamba Quiroz, Huamaní-Valderrama, Gutiérrez, Aguilar-Kirigin, Chaparro, & Abdala, 2021

Species of lizard

Liolaemus yarabamba is a species of lizard in the family Liolaemidae. The species is endemic to Peru.
