= Liolaemus brizuelai =

Scientific classification
- Kingdom: Animalia
- Phylum: Chordata
- Class: Reptilia
- Order: Squamata
- Suborder: Iguania
- Family: Liolaemidae
- Genus: Liolaemus
- Species: L. brizuelai

Binomial name
- Liolaemus brizuelai Fernández, Abdala, Ruiz-Monachesi, Semham & Quinteros, 2021

Species of lizard

Liolaemus brizuelai is a species of lizard in the family Liolaemidae. The species is endemic to Argentina.

== Etymology ==
The specific name, brizuelai, is in honor of Argentine landowner Pío Brizuela, on whose property the holotype was collected.

== Geographic range ==
L. brizuelai is only known from Catamarca Province in northwestern Argentina.

== Habitat ==
L. brizuelai inhabits a sandy region dominated by Prosopis flexuosa forest. It can be found under fallen trees.

== Description ==
L. brizuelai is a medium-sized member of the genus Liolaemus, reaching 57.5 mm (2.3 in) in snout–vent length.
