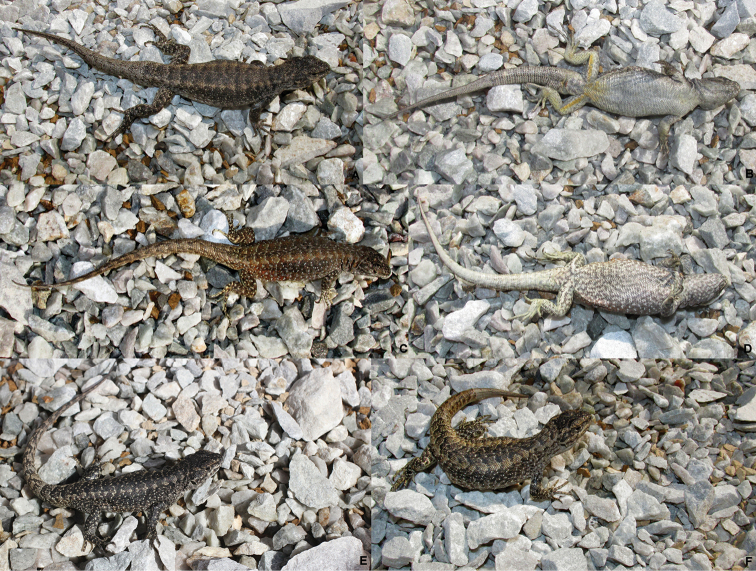

Scientific classification
- Kingdom: Animalia
- Phylum: Chordata
- Class: Reptilia
- Order: Squamata
- Suborder: Iguania
- Family: Liolaemidae
- Genus: Liolaemus
- Species: L. zabalai

Binomial name
- Liolaemus zabalai Troncoso-Palacios, Díaz, Esquerré, & Urra, 2015

= Liolaemus zabalai =

Species of lizard

Liolaemus zabalai is a species of lizard in the family Liolaemidae. It is from Chile.
