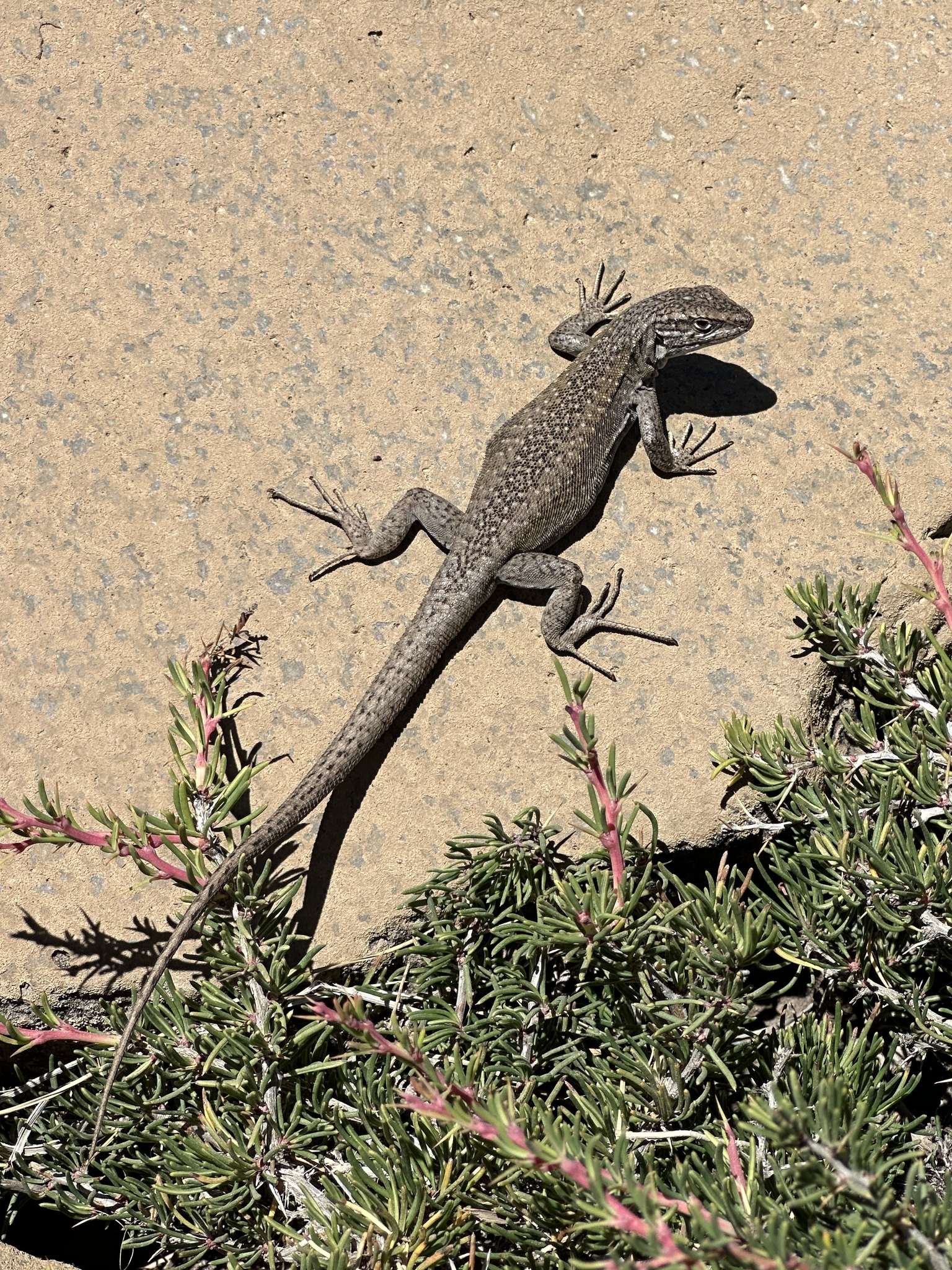
- Liolaemus carlosgarini, Chile

Conservation status
- Vulnerable (IUCN 3.1)

Scientific classification
- Kingdom: Animalia
- Phylum: Chordata
- Class: Reptilia
- Order: Squamata
- Suborder: Iguania
- Family: Liolaemidae
- Genus: Liolaemus
- Species: L. carlosgarini

Binomial name
- Liolaemus carlosgarini Esquerre, Nunez, & Scolaro, 2013

= Liolaemus carlosgarini =

Species of lizard

Liolaemus carlosgarini, Garín's lizard, is a species of lizard in the family Liolaemidae. It is native to Chile.
