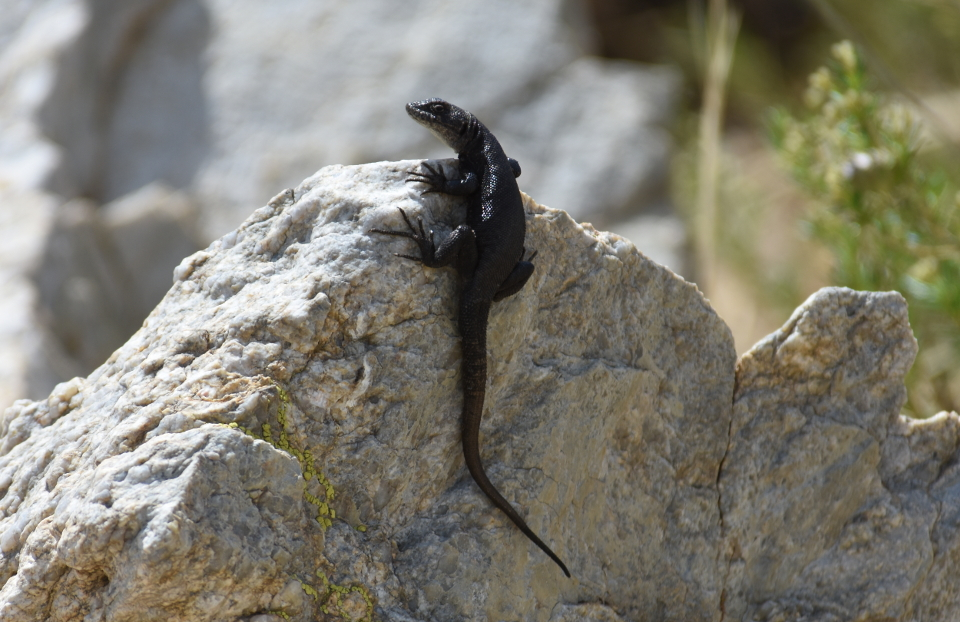

Conservation status
- Least Concern (IUCN 3.1)

Scientific classification
- Kingdom: Animalia
- Phylum: Chordata
- Class: Reptilia
- Order: Squamata
- Suborder: Iguania
- Family: Liolaemidae
- Genus: Liolaemus
- Species: L. umbrifer

Binomial name
- Liolaemus umbrifer Espinoza & Lobo, 2003

= Liolaemus umbrifer =

Species of lizard

Liolaemus umbrifer is a species of lizard in the family Liolaemidae. It is endemic to the Catamarca Province in northwestern Argentina.

It is a moderately-sized to large-bodied species. It is brown to black in coloration. It is commonly encountered on rocky hillsides and outcroppings in the Andean foothills at relatively high elevation.
