= Liolaemus dumerili =

Conservation status
- Least Concern (IUCN 3.1)

Scientific classification
- Kingdom: Animalia
- Phylum: Chordata
- Class: Reptilia
- Order: Squamata
- Suborder: Iguania
- Family: Liolaemidae
- Genus: Liolaemus
- Species: L. dumerili

Binomial name
- Liolaemus dumerili Abdala, Semhan, Moreno Azocar, Bonino, Paz, & Cruz, 2012

Species of lizard

Liolaemus dumerili is a species of lizard in the family Liolaemidae. It is native to Argentina.
