= Liolaemus acostai =

Conservation status
- Least Concern (IUCN 3.1)

Scientific classification
- Kingdom: Animalia
- Phylum: Chordata
- Class: Reptilia
- Order: Squamata
- Suborder: Iguania
- Family: Liolaemidae
- Genus: Liolaemus
- Species: L. acostai

Binomial name
- Liolaemus acostai Abdala & Júarez-Heredia, 2013

Species of lizard

Liolaemus acostai is a species of lizard in the family Liolaemidae. It is endemic to Argentina.

== Etymology ==
The specific name, acostai, is in honor of Argentinian herpetologist Juan Carlos Acosta.

== Geographic range ==
L. acostai is found in San Juan Province, Argentina.

== Habitat ==
The preferred natural habitat of L. acostai is grassland, at altitudes of 700–900 m (2,300–3,000 ft).

== Behavior ==
L. acostai is terrestrial.

== Diet ==
L. acostai preys predominately upon ants.

== Reproduction ==
L. acostai is oviparous.
