= Liolaemus leftrarui =

Scientific classification
- Kingdom: Animalia
- Phylum: Chordata
- Class: Reptilia
- Order: Squamata
- Suborder: Iguania
- Family: Liolaemidae
- Genus: Liolaemus
- Species: L. leftrarui

Binomial name
- Liolaemus leftrarui Troncoso-Palacios, Diaz, Puas, Riveros-Riffo, & Elorza, 2016

Species of lizard

Liolaemus leftraruii is a species of lizard in the family Iguanidae. It is found in Chile.
