= Liolaemus lenzi =

Scientific classification
- Domain: Eukaryota
- Kingdom: Animalia
- Phylum: Chordata
- Class: Reptilia
- Order: Squamata
- Suborder: Iguania
- Family: Liolaemidae
- Genus: Liolaemus
- Species: L. lenzi

Binomial name
- Liolaemus lenzi (Boettger, 1891)

Species of lizard

Liolaemus lenzi, Lenz's iguana, is a species of lizard in the family Liolaemidae. It is found in Bolivia.
