= Liolaemus ubaghsi =

Conservation status
- Data Deficient (IUCN 3.1)

Scientific classification
- Kingdom: Animalia
- Phylum: Chordata
- Class: Reptilia
- Order: Squamata
- Suborder: Iguania
- Family: Liolaemidae
- Genus: Liolaemus
- Species: L. ubaghsi

Binomial name
- Liolaemus ubaghsi Esquerre, Troncoso-Palacios, Garin, & Nunez, 2014

Species of lizard

Liolaemus ubaghsi, Ubaghs's leopard lizard, is a species of lizard in the family Liolaemidae. The species is endemic to Chile.
