= Liolaemus terani =

Scientific classification
- Kingdom: Animalia
- Phylum: Chordata
- Class: Reptilia
- Order: Squamata
- Suborder: Iguania
- Family: Liolaemidae
- Genus: Liolaemus
- Species: L. terani

Binomial name
- Liolaemus terani Abdala, Díaz Gómez, & Langstroth, 2021

Species of lizard

Liolaemus terani is a species of lizard in the family Iguanidae or the family Liolaemidae. The species is endemic to Argentina.
