= Liolaemus victormoralesii =

Scientific classification
- Kingdom: Animalia
- Phylum: Chordata
- Class: Reptilia
- Order: Squamata
- Suborder: Iguania
- Family: Liolaemidae
- Genus: Liolaemus
- Species: L. victormoralesii

Binomial name
- Liolaemus victormoralesii Aguilar-Puntriano, Ramírez, Castillo, Mendoza, Vargas, & Sites, 2019

Species of lizard

Liolaemus victormoralesii is a species of lizard in the family Liolaemidae. The species is endemic to Peru.
