= Liolaemus anqapuka =

Scientific classification
- Kingdom: Animalia
- Phylum: Chordata
- Class: Reptilia
- Order: Squamata
- Suborder: Iguania
- Family: Liolaemidae
- Genus: Liolaemus
- Species: L. anqapuka

Binomial name
- Liolaemus anqapuka Huamaní-Valderrama, Quiroz, Gutiérrez, Aguilar-Kirigin, Chaparro, & Abdala, 2020

Species of lizard

Liolaemus anqapuka is a species of lizard in the family Liolaemidae. It is native to Peru.
