= Liolaemus tacora =

Scientific classification
- Kingdom: Animalia
- Phylum: Chordata
- Class: Reptilia
- Order: Squamata
- Suborder: Iguania
- Family: Liolaemidae
- Genus: Liolaemus
- Species: L. tacora

Binomial name
- Liolaemus tacora Demangel, 2016

Species of lizard

Liolaemus tacora, the Tacora lizard, is a species of lizard in the family Liolaemidae. The species is endemic to Chile.
