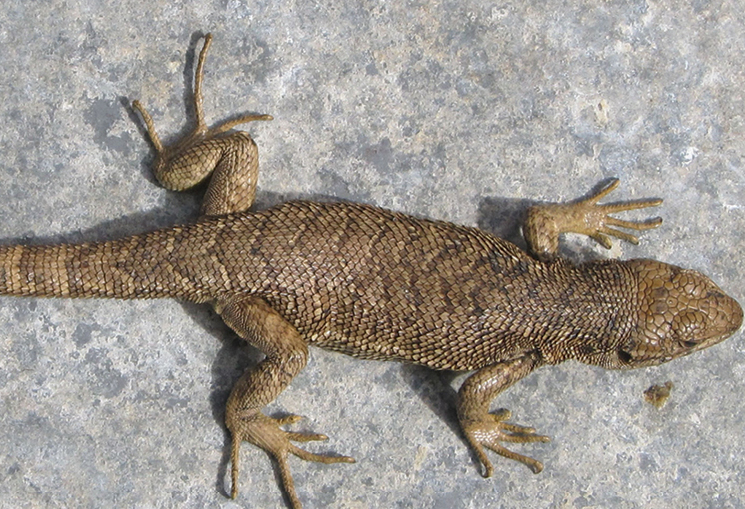

Conservation status
- Least Concern (IUCN 3.1)

Scientific classification
- Kingdom: Animalia
- Phylum: Chordata
- Class: Reptilia
- Order: Squamata
- Suborder: Iguania
- Family: Liolaemidae
- Genus: Liolaemus
- Species: L. bellii

Binomial name
- Liolaemus bellii JE Gray, 1845

= Liolaemus bellii =

Species of lizard

Liolaemus bellii is a species of lizard in the family Liolaemidae. It is native to Chile.
