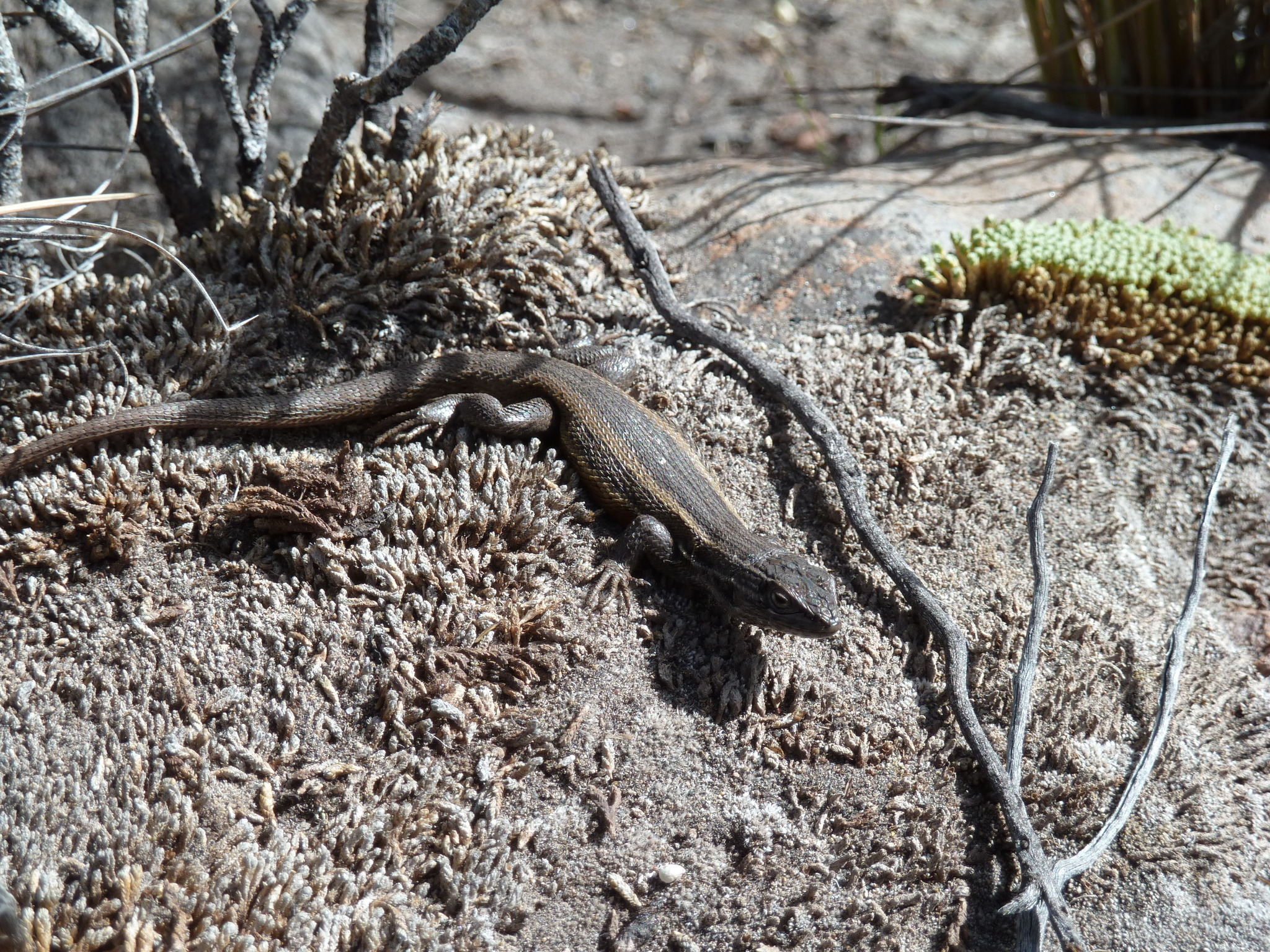
- Liolaemus alticolor imaged in Bolivia in the Oruro Department

Scientific classification
- Kingdom: Animalia
- Phylum: Chordata
- Class: Reptilia
- Order: Squamata
- Suborder: Iguania
- Family: Liolaemidae
- Genus: Liolaemus
- Species: L. alticolor

Binomial name
- Liolaemus alticolor Barbour, 1909

= Liolaemus alticolor =

Species of lizard

Liolaemus alticolor, also known by its common name the brilliant tree iguana, is a species of lizard in the family Liolaemidae. It is native to Bolivia, Chile, and Peru. It is a small and slender species being a maximum length of only 54.1 millimeters.

This species is named after "alti" which in the Latin language means high or lofty while "color" is Latin for color, pigment, shade or tinge.
