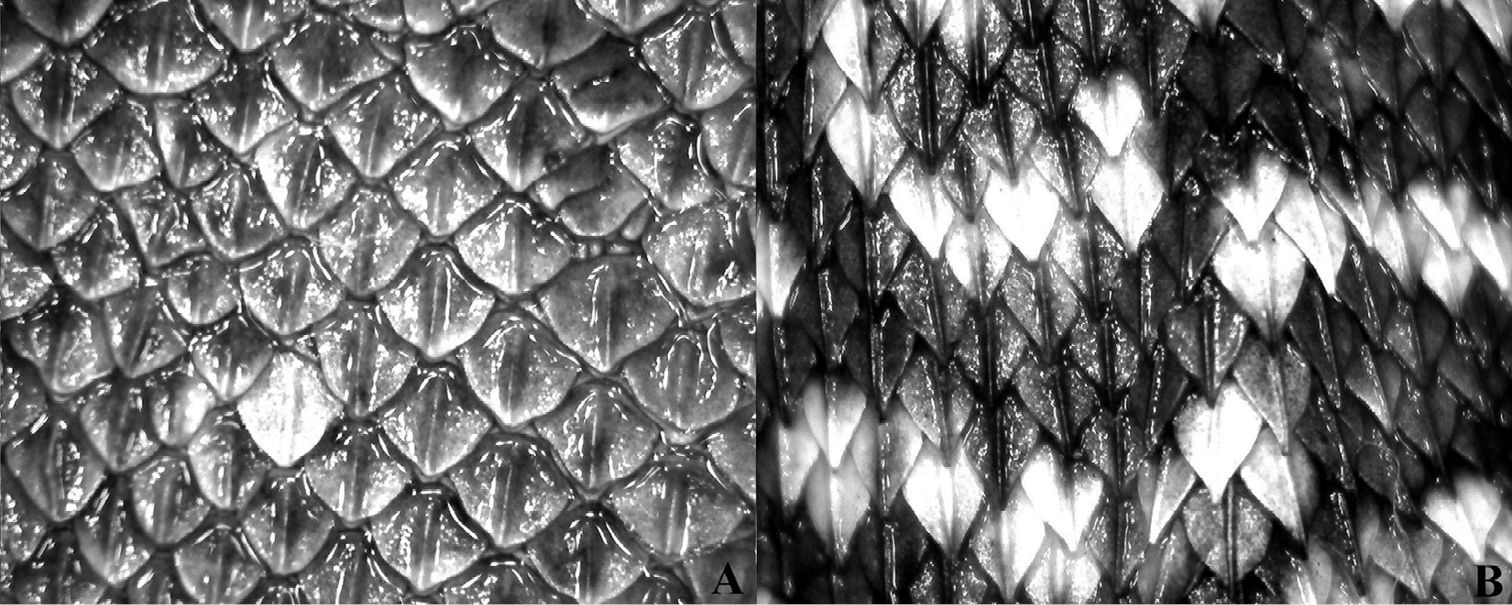
- Dorsal scales of L. uniformis

Scientific classification
- Kingdom: Animalia
- Phylum: Chordata
- Class: Reptilia
- Order: Squamata
- Suborder: Iguania
- Family: Liolaemidae
- Genus: Liolaemus
- Species: L. uniformis

Binomial name
- Liolaemus uniformis Troncoso-Palacios, Elorza, Puas, & Alfaro-Pardo, 2016

= Liolaemus uniformis =

Species of lizard

Liolaemus uniformis is a species of lizard in the family Iguanidae or the family Liolaemidae. The species is endemic to Chile.
