= Liolaemus quinterosi =

Scientific classification
- Kingdom: Animalia
- Phylum: Chordata
- Class: Reptilia
- Order: Squamata
- Suborder: Iguania
- Family: Liolaemidae
- Genus: Liolaemus
- Species: L. quinterosi

Binomial name
- Liolaemus quinterosi Ruiz, Quipildor, Bulacios-Arroyo, Chafrat, & Abdala, 2019

Species of lizard

Liolaemus quinterosi is a species of lizard in the family Liolaemidae. It is native to Argentina.
