= Liolaemus hauthali =

Scientific classification
- Kingdom: Animalia
- Phylum: Chordata
- Class: Reptilia
- Order: Squamata
- Suborder: Iguania
- Family: Liolaemidae
- Genus: Liolaemus
- Species: L. hauthali

Binomial name
- Liolaemus hauthali Abdala, Díaz Gómez, & Langstroth, 2021

Species of lizard

Liolaemus hauthali is a species of lizard in the family Liolaemidae. It is native to Argentina.
