= Liolaemus warjantay =

Scientific classification
- Kingdom: Animalia
- Phylum: Chordata
- Class: Reptilia
- Order: Squamata
- Suborder: Iguania
- Family: Liolaemidae
- Genus: Liolaemus
- Species: L. warjantay

Binomial name
- Liolaemus warjantay Ubalde-Mamani, Gutiérrez, Chaparro, Aguilar-Kirigin, Cerdeña, Huanca-Mamani, Cárdenas-Ninasivincha, Lazo-Rivera, & Abdala, 2021

Species of lizard

Liolaemus warjantay is a species of lizard in the family Liolaemidae. The species is endemic to Peru.
