= Liolaemus torresi =

Conservation status
- Endangered (IUCN 3.1)

Scientific classification
- Kingdom: Animalia
- Phylum: Chordata
- Class: Reptilia
- Order: Squamata
- Suborder: Iguania
- Family: Liolaemidae
- Genus: Liolaemus
- Species: L. torresi

Binomial name
- Liolaemus torresi (Nunez, Herman, Navarro, Garin, Pincheira-Donoso, & Meriggio, 2003)

Species of lizard

Liolaemus torresi, the dragon of Torres-Mura, is a species of lizard in the family Liolaemidae. It is from Chile.
