= Liolaemus josei =

Conservation status
- Least Concern (IUCN 3.1)

Scientific classification
- Kingdom: Animalia
- Phylum: Chordata
- Class: Reptilia
- Order: Squamata
- Suborder: Iguania
- Family: Liolaemidae
- Genus: Liolaemus
- Species: L. josei

Binomial name
- Liolaemus josei Abdala, 2005

Species of lizard

Liolaemus josei is a species of lizard in the family Liolaemidae. The species is endemic to Argentina.

== Etymology ==
The specific name, josei, is in honor of José Simón Abdala who is the father of the describer, and is Professor of Dentistry at Universidad de Cuyo in Mendoza, Argentina.

== Geographic range ==
L. josei is found in La Pampa Province and Mendoza Province, Argentina.

== Habitat ==
The preferred natural habitat of L. josei is savanna, at altitudes of 700–2,100 m (2,300–6,900 ft).

== Reproduction ==
L. josei is oviparous.
