= Liolaemus absconditus =

Scientific classification
- Kingdom: Animalia
- Phylum: Chordata
- Class: Reptilia
- Order: Squamata
- Suborder: Iguania
- Family: Liolaemidae
- Genus: Liolaemus
- Species: L. absconditus

Binomial name
- Liolaemus absconditus Vega, Quinteros, Stellatelli, Bellagamba, Block, & Madrid, 2018

Species of lizard

Liolaemus absconditus is a species of lizard in the family Liolaemidae. It is native to Argentina.
