= Liolaemus tehuelche =

Conservation status
- Least Concern (IUCN 3.1)

Scientific classification
- Kingdom: Animalia
- Phylum: Chordata
- Class: Reptilia
- Order: Squamata
- Suborder: Iguania
- Family: Liolaemidae
- Genus: Liolaemus
- Species: L. tehuelche

Binomial name
- Liolaemus tehuelche Abdala, 2003

Species of lizard

Liolaemus tehuelche is a species of lizard in the family Liolaemidae. The species is endemic to Argentina.
