= Liolaemus antonietae =

Scientific classification
- Kingdom: Animalia
- Phylum: Chordata
- Class: Reptilia
- Order: Squamata
- Suborder: Iguania
- Family: Liolaemidae
- Genus: Liolaemus
- Species: L. antonietae

Binomial name
- Liolaemus antonietae Troncoso-Palacios, Esquerré, Urra, Díaz, Castro-Pastene & Ruiz, 2018

Species of lizard

Liolaemus antonietae, also known commonly as Antonieta's lizard and el lagarto de Antonieta in Spanish, is a species of lizard in the family Liolaemidae. The species is endemic to Chile.

== Etymology ==
The specific name, antonietae, is in honor of Chilean herpetologist Antonieta Labra Lillo.

== Geographic range ==
L. antonietae is found in central Chile, in Biobío Region.

== Description ==
Medium-sized for its genus, L. antonietae may attain a snout-to-vent length (SVL) of about 7.5 cm (3.0 in).

== Behavior ==
Mainly arboreal, L. anchietae has been observed basking on tree trunks at heights of as much as 4 m (13 ft).

== Reproduction ==
The mode of reproduction of L. antonietae is not known.
