= Liolaemus pikunche =

Scientific classification
- Kingdom: Animalia
- Phylum: Chordata
- Class: Reptilia
- Order: Squamata
- Suborder: Iguania
- Family: Liolaemidae
- Genus: Liolaemus
- Species: L. pikunche

Binomial name
- Liolaemus pikunche Troncoso-Palacios & Ramírez-Álvarez, 2021

Species of lizard

Liolaemus pikunche is a species of lizard in the family Liolaemidae. It is found in Chile.
