= Liolaemus lonquimayensis =

Scientific classification
- Kingdom: Animalia
- Phylum: Chordata
- Class: Reptilia
- Order: Squamata
- Suborder: Iguania
- Family: Liolaemidae
- Genus: Liolaemus
- Species: L. lonquimayensis

Binomial name
- Liolaemus lonquimayensis Escobar-Huerta, Santibanez-Toro, & Ortiz, 2015

Species of lizard

Liolaemus lonquimayensis is a species of lizard in the family Liolaemidae. It is found in Chile.
