= Liolaemus hugoi =

Scientific classification
- Kingdom: Animalia
- Phylum: Chordata
- Class: Reptilia
- Order: Squamata
- Suborder: Iguania
- Family: Liolaemidae
- Genus: Liolaemus
- Species: L. hugoi

Binomial name
- Liolaemus hugoi Bulacios-Arroyo, Semhan, Paz, Chafrat, & Abdala, 2021

Species of lizard

Liolaemus hugoi is a species of lizard in the family Liolaemidae. It is native to Argentina.
