= Liolaemus igneus =

Scientific classification
- Kingdom: Animalia
- Phylum: Chordata
- Class: Reptilia
- Order: Squamata
- Suborder: Iguania
- Family: Liolaemidae
- Genus: Liolaemus
- Species: L. igneus

Binomial name
- Liolaemus igneus Demangel, 2016

Species of lizard

Liolaemus igneus, the Puna reddish lizard, is a species of lizard in the family Liolaemidae. It is native to Chile.
