= Liolaemus shehuen =

Conservation status
- Least Concern (IUCN 3.1)

Scientific classification
- Kingdom: Animalia
- Phylum: Chordata
- Class: Reptilia
- Order: Squamata
- Suborder: Iguania
- Family: Liolaemidae
- Genus: Liolaemus
- Species: L. shehuen

Binomial name
- Liolaemus shehuen Abdala, Diaz-Gomez, & Juarez-Heredia, 2012

Species of lizard

Liolaemus shehuen is a species of lizard in the family Liolaemidae. It is native to Argentina.
