= Liolaemus cazianiae =

Conservation status
- Least Concern (IUCN 3.1)

Scientific classification
- Kingdom: Animalia
- Phylum: Chordata
- Class: Reptilia
- Order: Squamata
- Suborder: Iguania
- Family: Liolaemidae
- Genus: Liolaemus
- Species: L. cazianiae

Binomial name
- Liolaemus cazianiae Lobo, Slodki & Valdecantos, 2010

Species of lizard

Liolaemus cazianiae is a species of lizard in the family Liolaemidae. The species is endemic to Argentina.

== Etymology ==
The specific name, cazianiae (feminine, genitive singular), is in honor of Argentinean ecologist Sandra Caziani (1961–2005).

== Geographic range ==
L. cazianiae is found in Salta Province, Argentina.

== Habitat ==
The preferred natural habitats of L. cazianiae are shrubland and grassland, at altitudes of 3,485–4,285 m (11,434–14,058 ft).

== Diet ==
The diet of L. cazianiae consists of plant material.

== Reproduction ==
L. cazianiae is viviparous.
