= Liolaemus archipensis =

Scientific classification
- Kingdom: Animalia
- Phylum: Chordata
- Class: Reptilia
- Order: Squamata
- Suborder: Iguania
- Family: Liolaemidae
- Genus: Liolaemus
- Species: L. arequipensis

Binomial name
- Liolaemus arequipensis

Species of lizard

Liolaemus arequipensis is a species of lizard native to the Puna region of the Andes Mountains in Arequipa, Peru. It is found at altitudes exceeding 4,800 meters.
