= Liolaemus erroneus =

Conservation status
- Data Deficient (IUCN 3.1)

Scientific classification
- Kingdom: Animalia
- Phylum: Chordata
- Class: Reptilia
- Order: Squamata
- Suborder: Iguania
- Family: Liolaemidae
- Genus: Liolaemus
- Species: L. erroneus

Binomial name
- Liolaemus erroneus (Nunez & Yanez, 1983)

Species of lizard

Liolaemus erroneus is a species of lizard in the family Liolaemidae. It is native to Chile.
