= Liolaemus confusus =

Conservation status
- Data Deficient (IUCN 3.1)

Scientific classification
- Kingdom: Animalia
- Phylum: Chordata
- Class: Reptilia
- Order: Squamata
- Suborder: Iguania
- Family: Liolaemidae
- Genus: Liolaemus
- Species: L. confusus

Binomial name
- Liolaemus confusus Nunez & Pincheira-Donoso, 2006

Species of lizard

Liolaemus confusus is a species of lizard in the family Liolaemidae. It is native to Chile.
