= Liolaemus evaristoi =

Scientific classification
- Kingdom: Animalia
- Phylum: Chordata
- Class: Reptilia
- Order: Squamata
- Suborder: Iguania
- Family: Liolaemidae
- Genus: Liolaemus
- Species: L. evaristoi

Binomial name
- Liolaemus evaristoi Gutierrez, Chaparro, Vasquez, Quiroz, Aguilar Kirigin, & Abdala, 2018

Species of lizard

Liolaemus evaristoi is a species of lizard in the family Liolaemidae. It is native to Peru.
