= Liolaemus aureum =

Scientific classification
- Kingdom: Animalia
- Phylum: Chordata
- Class: Reptilia
- Order: Squamata
- Suborder: Iguania
- Family: Liolaemidae
- Genus: Liolaemus
- Species: L. aureum

Binomial name
- Liolaemus aureum Díaz-Vega, Maldonado, & Demangel, 2018

Species of lizard

Liolaemus aureum, the golden lizard, is a species of lizard in the family Liolaemidae. It is native to Chile.
