= Liolaemus salitrosus =

Scientific classification
- Kingdom: Animalia
- Phylum: Chordata
- Class: Reptilia
- Order: Squamata
- Suborder: Iguania
- Family: Liolaemidae
- Genus: Liolaemus
- Species: L. salitrosus

Binomial name
- Liolaemus salitrosus Abdala, Paz, Semhan, García, Aguilar-Kirigin, Farías, Valladares, Poblete, Quipildor, Valdes, & Langstroth, 2021

Species of lizard

Liolaemus salitrosus is a species of lizard in the family Liolaemidae. It is from Argentina.
