= Liolaemus purul =

Conservation status
- Least Concern (IUCN 3.1)

Scientific classification
- Kingdom: Animalia
- Phylum: Chordata
- Class: Reptilia
- Order: Squamata
- Suborder: Iguania
- Family: Liolaemidae
- Genus: Liolaemus
- Species: L. purul

Binomial name
- Liolaemus purul Abdala, Semhan, Moreno Azócar, Bonino, Paz, & Cruz, 2012

Species of lizard

Liolaemus purul is a species of lizard in the family Liolaemidae. It is endemic to Argentina.
