= Liolaemus hermannunezi =

Conservation status
- Data Deficient (IUCN 3.1)

Scientific classification
- Kingdom: Animalia
- Phylum: Chordata
- Class: Reptilia
- Order: Squamata
- Suborder: Iguania
- Family: Liolaemidae
- Genus: Liolaemus
- Species: L. hermannunezi

Binomial name
- Liolaemus hermannunezi Pincheira-Donoso, Scolaro & Schulte, 2007

Species of lizard

Liolaemus hermannunezi is a species of lizard in the family Liolaemidae. The species is native to Chile and perhaps Argentina.

== Etymology ==
The specific name, hermannunezi, is in honor of Chilean herpetologist Herman Núñez.

== Geographic range ==
L. hermannunezi is known only from its type locality in Biobío Region, central Chile, but it may also occur in adjacent Argentina.

== Habitat ==
The preferred natural habitats of L. hermannunezi are grassland and shrubland, at altitudes of 1,428–1,521 m (4,685–4,990 ft).

== Description ==
Small for its genus, L. hermannunezi, has an average snout-to-vent length (SVL) of 5.3 cm (2.1 in). The belly is black.

== Reproduction ==
L. hermannunezi is oviparous.
