= Liolaemus tolhuaca =

Scientific classification
- Kingdom: Animalia
- Phylum: Chordata
- Class: Reptilia
- Order: Squamata
- Suborder: Iguania
- Family: Liolaemidae
- Genus: Liolaemus
- Species: L. tolhuaca

Binomial name
- Liolaemus tolhuaca Demangel, 2016

Species of lizard

Liolaemus tolhuaca, the Tolhuaca lizard, is a species of lizard in the family Liolaemidae. It is from Chile.
