= Liolaemus koslowskyi =

Conservation status
- Least Concern (IUCN 3.1)

Scientific classification
- Kingdom: Animalia
- Phylum: Chordata
- Class: Reptilia
- Order: Squamata
- Suborder: Iguania
- Family: Liolaemidae
- Genus: Liolaemus
- Species: L. koslowskyi

Binomial name
- Liolaemus koslowskyi Etheridge, 1993

Species of lizard

Liolaemus koslowskyi is a species of lizard in the family Liolaemidae. The species is endemic to Argentina.

== Etymology ==
The specific name, koslowskyi, is in honor of Argentinian herpetologist Julio Germán Koslowsky.

== Geographic range ==
L. koslowskyi is found in the Argentinian provinces of Catamarca and La Rioja.

== Habitat ==
The preferred natural habitat of L. koslowskyi is shrubland, at altitudes of 800–2,450 m (2,620–8,040 ft).

== Diet ==
L. koslowskyi preys predominately upon ants, but also other invertebrates.

== Reproduction ==
L. koslowskyi is oviparous.

== Taxonomy ==
L. koslowskyi is a member of the L. darwinii species group.
