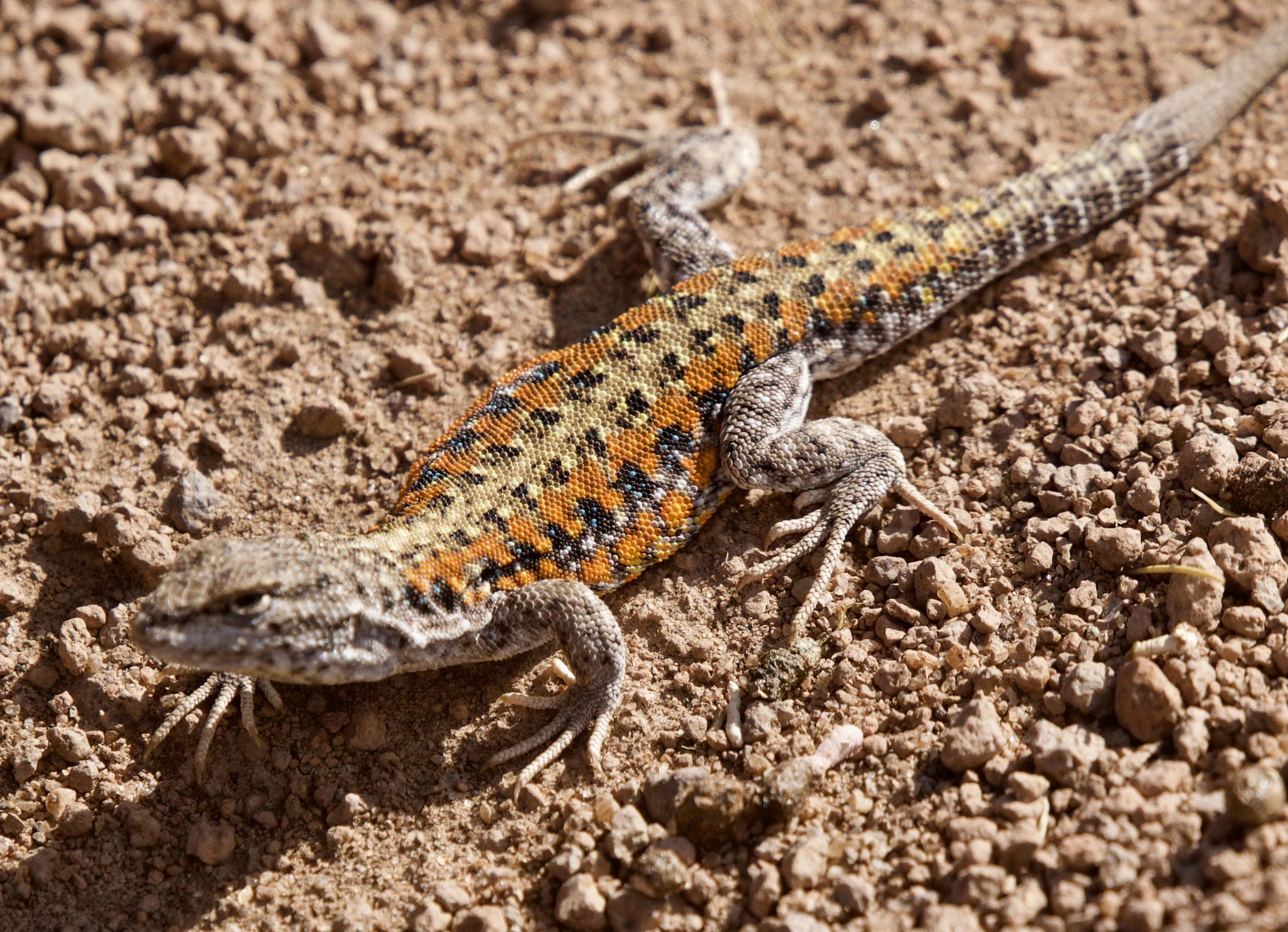

Scientific classification
- Kingdom: Animalia
- Phylum: Chordata
- Class: Reptilia
- Order: Squamata
- Suborder: Iguania
- Family: Liolaemidae
- Genus: Liolaemus
- Species: L. omorfi

Binomial name
- Liolaemus omorfi Demangel, Sepulveda, Jara, Pincheira-Donoso, & Nunez, 2015

= Liolaemus omorfi =

Species of lizard

Liolaemus omorfi, the beautiful lizard, is a species of lizard in the family Liolaemidae. It is found in Chile.
