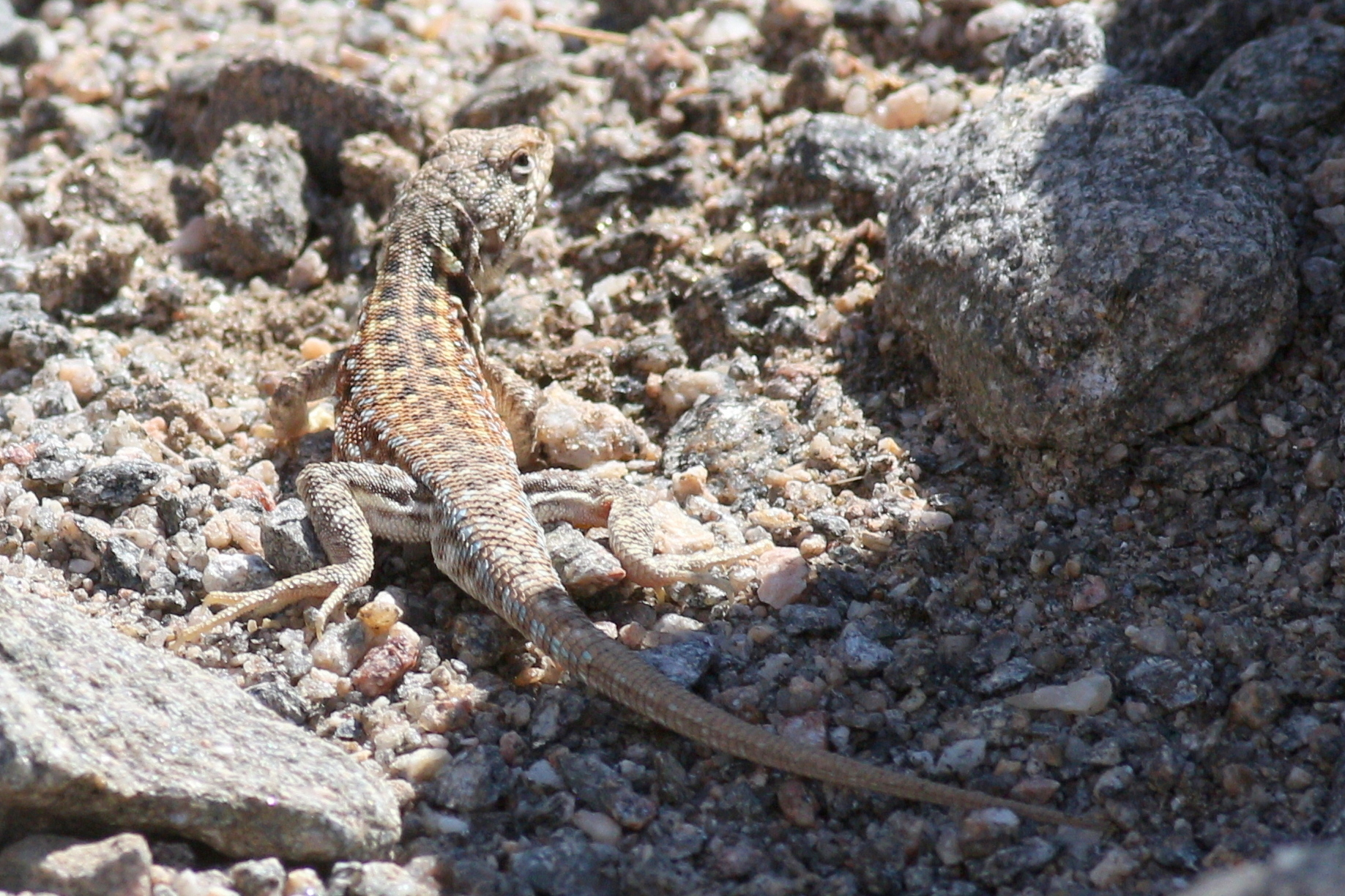

Conservation status
- Near Threatened (IUCN 3.1)

Scientific classification
- Kingdom: Animalia
- Phylum: Chordata
- Class: Reptilia
- Order: Squamata
- Suborder: Iguania
- Family: Liolaemidae
- Genus: Liolaemus
- Species: L. quilmes

Binomial name
- Liolaemus quilmes Etheridge, 1993

= Liolaemus quilmes =

Species of lizard

Liolaemus quilmes is a species of lizard in the family Liolaemidae. It is native to Argentina.
