= Liolaemus balagueri =

Scientific classification
- Kingdom: Animalia
- Phylum: Chordata
- Class: Reptilia
- Order: Squamata
- Suborder: Iguania
- Family: Liolaemidae
- Genus: Liolaemus
- Species: L. balagueri

Binomial name
- Liolaemus balagueri Villegas Paredes, Huamaní-Valderrama, Luque-Fernández, Gutiérrez, Quiróz, & Abdala, 2020

Species of lizard

Liolaemus balagueri is a species of lizard in the family Liolaemidae. It is native to Peru.
