= Liolaemus janequeoae =

Scientific classification
- Kingdom: Animalia
- Phylum: Chordata
- Class: Reptilia
- Order: Squamata
- Suborder: Iguania
- Family: Liolaemidae
- Genus: Liolaemus
- Species: L. janequeoae

Binomial name
- Liolaemus janequeoae Troncoso-Palacios, Diaz, Puas, Riveros-Riffo, & Elorza, 2016

Species of lizard

Liolaemus janequeoae, Janequeo's lizard, is a species of lizard in the family Iguanidae. It is found in Chile.
