= Liolaemus kunza =

Scientific classification
- Kingdom: Animalia
- Phylum: Chordata
- Class: Reptilia
- Order: Squamata
- Suborder: Iguania
- Family: Liolaemidae
- Genus: Liolaemus
- Species: L. kunza

Binomial name
- Liolaemus kunza Abdala, Semhan, & Paz, 2021

Species of lizard

Liolaemus kunza is a species of lizard in the family Liolaemidae. It is native to Argentina.
