= Liolaemus disjunctus =

Conservation status
- Data Deficient (IUCN 3.1)

Scientific classification
- Kingdom: Animalia
- Phylum: Chordata
- Class: Reptilia
- Order: Squamata
- Suborder: Iguania
- Family: Liolaemidae
- Genus: Liolaemus
- Species: L. disjunctus

Binomial name
- Liolaemus disjunctus Laurent, 1990

Species of lizard

Liolaemus disjunctus is a species of lizard in the family Liolaemidae. It is native to Peru.
