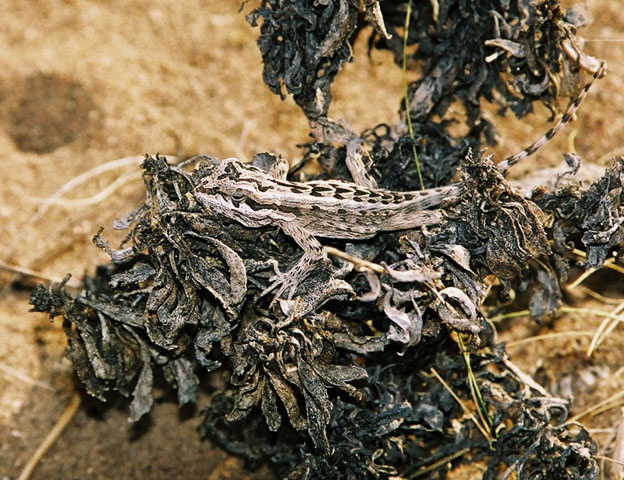

Conservation status
- Vulnerable (IUCN 3.1)

Scientific classification
- Kingdom: Animalia
- Phylum: Chordata
- Class: Reptilia
- Order: Squamata
- Suborder: Iguania
- Family: Liolaemidae
- Genus: Liolaemus
- Species: L. martorii

Binomial name
- Liolaemus martorii Abdala, 2003

= Liolaemus martorii =

Species of lizard

Liolaemus martorii is a species of lizard in the family Liolaemidae. The species is endemic to Argentina.

== Etymology ==
The specific name, martorii, is in honor of Argentinian herpetologist Ricardo Armando Martori.

== Geographic distribution ==
Liolaemus martorii is found in Río Negro Province, Argentina.

== Habitat ==
The preferred natural habitat of Liolaemus martorii is shrubland on sand dunes or sandy soil, at altitudes from sea level to 200 m (660 ft).

== Behavior ==
Liolaemus martorii is terrestrial.

== Diet ==
Liolaemus martorii preys predominately upon insects.

== Reproduction ==
Liolaemus martorii is oviparous.
