= Liolaemus normae =

Scientific classification
- Kingdom: Animalia
- Phylum: Chordata
- Class: Reptilia
- Order: Squamata
- Suborder: Iguania
- Family: Liolaemidae
- Genus: Liolaemus
- Species: L. normae

Binomial name
- Liolaemus normae Esquerré, Ramírez-Álvarez, Pavón-Vázquez, Troncoso-Palacios, Garín, Keogh, & Leaché, 2019

Species of lizard

Liolaemus normae, the Los Cristales leopard lizard or Norma's leopard lizard, is a species of lizard in the family Liolaemidae. It is found in Chile.
