= Liolaemus nazca =

Scientific classification
- Kingdom: Animalia
- Phylum: Chordata
- Class: Reptilia
- Order: Squamata
- Suborder: Iguania
- Family: Liolaemidae
- Genus: Liolaemus
- Species: L. nazca

Binomial name
- Liolaemus nazca Aguilar-Puntriano, Ramírez, Castillo, Mendoza, Vargas, & Sites, 2019

Species of lizard

Liolaemus nazca is a species of lizard in the family Liolaemidae. It is found in Peru.
