= Liolaemus vhagar =

Scientific classification
- Kingdom: Animalia
- Phylum: Chordata
- Class: Reptilia
- Order: Squamata
- Suborder: Iguania
- Family: Liolaemidae
- Genus: Liolaemus
- Species: L. vhagar

Binomial name
- Liolaemus vhagar Quinteros, Ruiz-Monachesi, & Abdala, 2019

Species of lizard

Liolaemus vhagar is a species of lizard in the family Liolaemidae. The species is endemic to Argentina.

== Etymology ==
In 2019, three species of Liolaemus were described that were previously considered populations of Liolaemus bibronii. These three species are Liolaemus balerion, Liolaemus vhagar, and Liolaemus meraxes, each named after one of the three dragons that conquered Westeros with King Aegon I Targaryen from George R. R. Martin's A Song of Ice and Fire.
