= Liolaemus lavillai =

Conservation status
- Least Concern (IUCN 3.1)

Scientific classification
- Kingdom: Animalia
- Phylum: Chordata
- Class: Reptilia
- Order: Squamata
- Suborder: Iguania
- Family: Liolaemidae
- Genus: Liolaemus
- Species: L. lavillai

Binomial name
- Liolaemus lavillai Abdala & Lobo, 2006

Species of lizard

Liolaemus lavillai is a species of lizard in the family Liolaemidae. The species is endemic to Argentina.

== Etymology ==
The specific name, lavillai, is in honor of Argentinian herpetologist Esteban Orlando Lavilla.

== Geographic range ==
L. lavillai is found in northwestern Argentina, in Salta Province.

== Habitat ==
The preferred natural habitats of L. lavillai are shrubland, grassland, and desert, at altitudes of 2,800–4,100 m (9,200–13,500 ft).

== Reproduction ==
The mode of reproduction of L. lavillai has been described as viviparous and as ovoviviparous.

== Taxonomy ==
L. lavillai is a member of the L. darwinii species group.
