= Liolaemus etheridgei =

Conservation status
- Least Concern (IUCN 3.1)

Scientific classification
- Kingdom: Animalia
- Phylum: Chordata
- Class: Reptilia
- Order: Squamata
- Suborder: Iguania
- Family: Liolaemidae
- Genus: Liolaemus
- Species: L. etheridgei

Binomial name
- Liolaemus etheridgei Laurent, 1998

Species of lizard

Liolaemus etheridgei is a species of lizard in the family Liolaemidae. It is native to Peru.

== Etymology ==
The specific name, etheridgei, is in honor of American herpetologist Richard Emmett Etheridge.

== Geographic range ==
Within Peru, L. etheridgei is found in the Regions (formerly Departments) of Arequipa and Moquegua.

== Habitat ==
The preferred natural habitats of L. etheridgei are shrubland and grassland, at altitudes of 2,400–4,269 m (7,874–14,006 ft).

== Diet ==
L. etheridgei preys upon insects.

== Reproduction ==
L. etheridgei is viviparous.
