= Liolaemus bitaeniatus =

Conservation status
- Least Concern (IUCN 3.1)

Scientific classification
- Kingdom: Animalia
- Phylum: Chordata
- Class: Reptilia
- Order: Squamata
- Suborder: Iguania
- Family: Liolaemidae
- Genus: Liolaemus
- Species: L. bitaeniatus

Binomial name
- Liolaemus bitaeniatus Laurent, 1984

Species of lizard

Liolaemus bitaeniatus, the striped tree iguana, is a species of lizard in the family Liolaemidae. It is native to Argentina.
