= Liolaemus meraxes =

Scientific classification
- Kingdom: Animalia
- Phylum: Chordata
- Class: Reptilia
- Order: Squamata
- Suborder: Iguania
- Family: Liolaemidae
- Genus: Liolaemus
- Species: L. meraxes

Binomial name
- Liolaemus meraxes Quinteros, Ruiz-Monachesi, & Abdala, 2019

Species of lizard

Liolaemus meraxes is a species of lizard in the family Iguanidae. It is found in Argentina.

== Etymology ==
In 2019, three species of Liolaemus were described that were previously considered populations of Liolaemus bibronii. These three species are Liolaemus balerion, Liolaemus vhagar, and Liolaemus meraxes, each named after one of the three dragons that conquered Westeros with King Aegon I Targaryen from George R. R. Martin's A Song of Ice and Fire.
