= Liolaemus salinicola =

Conservation status
- Endangered (IUCN 3.1)

Scientific classification
- Kingdom: Animalia
- Phylum: Chordata
- Class: Reptilia
- Order: Squamata
- Suborder: Iguania
- Family: Liolaemidae
- Genus: Liolaemus
- Species: L. salinicola

Binomial name
- Liolaemus salinicola Laurent, 1986

Species of lizard

Liolaemus salinicola is a species of lizard in the family Liolaemidae. It is from Argentina.
