= Liolaemus fittkaui =

Conservation status
- Vulnerable (IUCN 3.1)

Scientific classification
- Kingdom: Animalia
- Phylum: Chordata
- Class: Reptilia
- Order: Squamata
- Suborder: Iguania
- Family: Liolaemidae
- Genus: Liolaemus
- Species: L. fittkaui

Binomial name
- Liolaemus fittkaui Laurent, 1986

Species of lizard

Liolaemus fittkaui is a species of lizard in the family Liolaemidae. It is endemic to Bolivia.

== Etymology ==
The specific name, fittkaui, is in honor of German herpetologist Ernst Josef Fittkau.

== Geographic range ==
L. fittkaui is found in Cochabamba Department, Bolivia.

== Habitat ==
The preferred natural habitats of L. fittkaui are forest and grassland, at altitudes of 3,800–4,260 m (12,470–13,980 ft).

== Reproduction ==
The mode of reproduction of L. fittkaui is unknown.
