= Liolaemus balerion =

Scientific classification
- Kingdom: Animalia
- Phylum: Chordata
- Class: Reptilia
- Order: Squamata
- Suborder: Iguania
- Family: Liolaemidae
- Genus: Liolaemus
- Species: L. balerion

Binomial name
- Liolaemus balerion Quinteros, Ruiz-Monachesi, & Abdala, 2019

Species of lizard

Liolaemus balerion is a species of lizard in the family Liolaemidae. It is native to Argentina.

== Etymology ==
In 2019, three species of Liolaemus were described that were previously considered populations of Liolaemus bibronii. These three species are Liolaemus balerion, Liolaemus vhagar, and Liolaemus meraxes, each named after one of the three dragons that conquered Westeros with King Aegon I Targaryen from George R. R. Martin's A Song of Ice and Fire.
