= Liolaemus ortizii =

Conservation status
- Least Concern (IUCN 3.1)

Scientific classification
- Kingdom: Animalia
- Phylum: Chordata
- Class: Reptilia
- Order: Squamata
- Suborder: Iguania
- Family: Liolaemidae
- Genus: Liolaemus
- Species: L. ortizii

Binomial name
- Liolaemus ortizii Laurent, 1982

Species of lizard

Liolaemus ortizii, also known commonly as Ortiz's tree iguana, is a species of lizard in the family Liolaemidae. The species is endemic to Peru.

== Etymology ==
The specific name, ortizii, is in honor of Chilean herpetologist Juan Carlos Ortíz-Zapata.

== Geographic distribution ==
Liolaemus ortizii is found in the Department of Cusco, Peru.

== Habitat ==
The preferred natural habitat of Liolaemus ortizii is grassland, at elevations of 4,119–4,250 m (13,514–13,944 ft).

== Behavior ==
Liolaemus ortizii is terrestrial

== Reproduction ==
Liolaemus ortizii is viviparous.
