= Liolaemus laurenti =

Conservation status
- Least Concern (IUCN 3.1)

Scientific classification
- Kingdom: Animalia
- Phylum: Chordata
- Class: Reptilia
- Order: Squamata
- Suborder: Iguania
- Family: Liolaemidae
- Genus: Liolaemus
- Species: L. laurenti

Binomial name
- Liolaemus laurenti Etheridge, 1992

Species of lizard

Liolaemus laurenti is a species of lizard in the family Liolaemidae. The species is endemic to Argentina.

== Etymology ==
The specific name, laurenti, is in honor of Belgian herpetologist Raymond Ferdinand Laurent.

== Geographic range ==
L. laurenti is found in northwestern Argentina, in the provinces of Catamarca, La Rioja, Mendoza, and San Juan.

== Habitat ==
The preferred natural habitat of L. laurenti is sandy shrubland, at altitudes of 800–1,000 m (2,600–3,300 ft).

== Behavior ==
L. laurenti is terrestrial.

== Reproduction ==
L. laurenti is oviparous.

== Taxonomy ==
L. laurenti is a member of the L. darwinii species group.
