= Liolaemus espinozai =

Conservation status
- Least Concern (IUCN 3.1)

Scientific classification
- Kingdom: Animalia
- Phylum: Chordata
- Class: Reptilia
- Order: Squamata
- Suborder: Iguania
- Family: Liolaemidae
- Genus: Liolaemus
- Species: L. espinozai

Binomial name
- Liolaemus espinozai Abdala, 2005

Species of lizard

Liolaemus espinozai is a species of lizard in the family Liolaemidae. It is native to Argentina.

== Etymology ==
The specific name, espinozai, is in honor of American herpetologist Robert Earl Espinoza.

== Geographic range ==
L. espinozai is endemic to Catamarca Province, Argentina.

== Habitat ==
The preferred natural habitats of L. espinozai are sand dunes, grassland, and shrubland, at altitudes of 2,200–2,800 m (7,200–9,200 ft).

== Diet ==
L. espinozai preys predominately upon ants.

== Reproduction ==
L. espinozai is ovoviviparous.

== Taxonomy ==
L. espinoza belongs to the L. darwinii species group.
