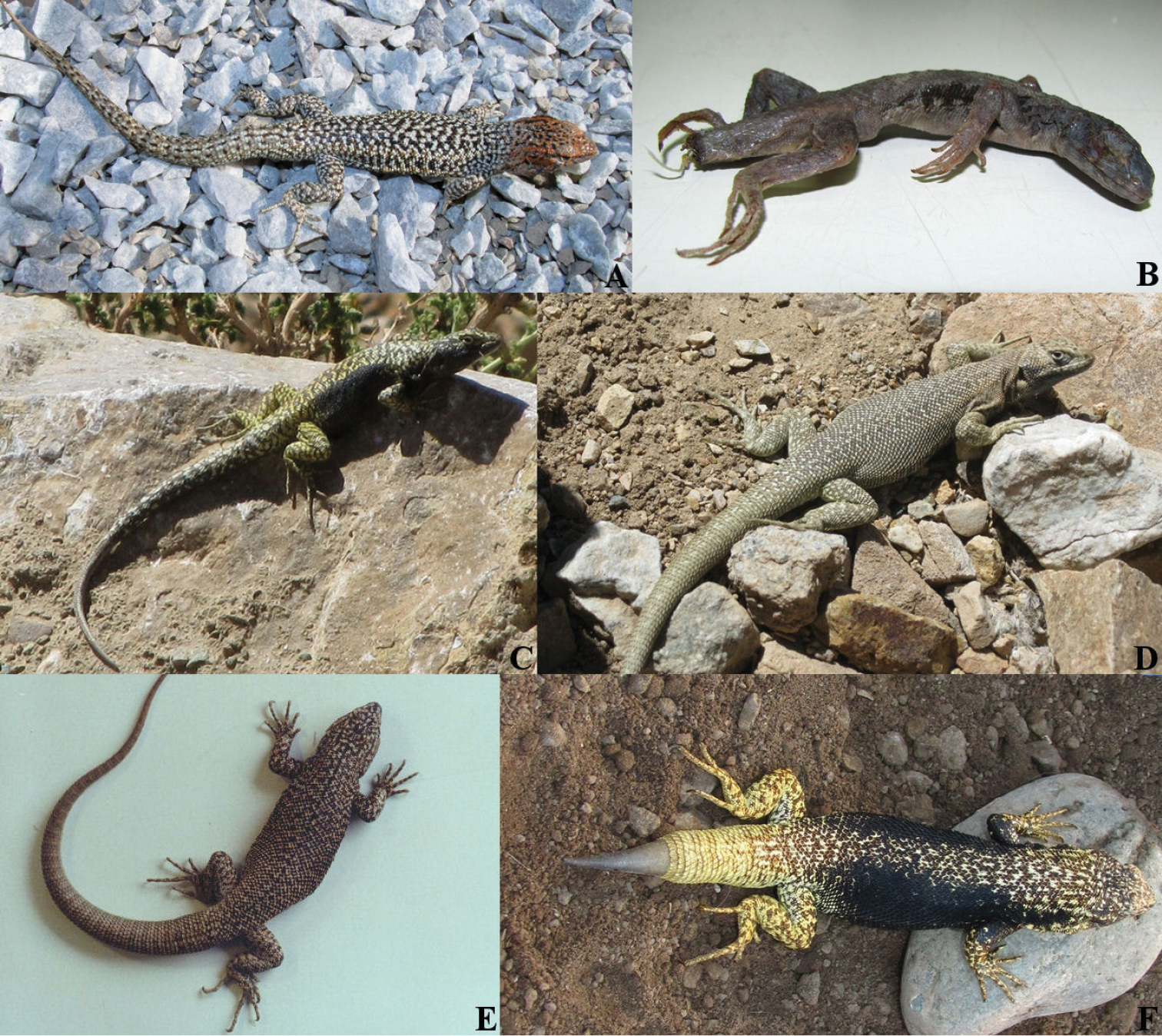
- Liolaemus juanortizi, Figure D

Conservation status
- Least Concern (IUCN 3.1)

Scientific classification
- Kingdom: Animalia
- Phylum: Chordata
- Class: Reptilia
- Order: Squamata
- Suborder: Iguania
- Family: Liolaemidae
- Genus: Liolaemus
- Species: L. juanortizi

Binomial name
- Liolaemus juanortizi Young-Downey & Moreno, 1991

= Liolaemus juanortizi =

Species of lizard

Liolaemus juanortizi is a species of lizard in the family Liolaemidae. The species is endemic to Chile.

== Etymology ==
The specific name, juanortizi, is in honor of Chilean herpetologist Juan Carlos Ortíz-Zapata.

== Geographic distribution ==
Liolaemus juanortizi is found in northern Chile, in Atacama Region.

== Habitat ==
The preferred natural habitat of Liolaemus juanortizi is cold desert, at elevations of 3,200–3,800 m (10,500–12,500 ft).

== Diet ==
Liolaemus juanortizi is omnivorous.
