= Liolaemus tari =

Conservation status
- Least Concern (IUCN 3.1)

Scientific classification
- Kingdom: Animalia
- Phylum: Chordata
- Class: Reptilia
- Order: Squamata
- Suborder: Iguania
- Family: Liolaemidae
- Genus: Liolaemus
- Species: L. tari

Binomial name
- Liolaemus tari Scolaro & Cei, 1997

Species of lizard

Liolaemus tari is a species of lizard in the family Liolaemidae. The species is endemic to Argentina.
