= Liolaemus hajeki =

Conservation status
- Least Concern (IUCN 3.1)

Scientific classification
- Kingdom: Animalia
- Phylum: Chordata
- Class: Reptilia
- Order: Squamata
- Suborder: Iguania
- Family: Liolaemidae
- Genus: Liolaemus
- Species: L. hajeki

Binomial name
- Liolaemus hajeki Núñez, Pincheira-Donoso & Garín, 2004

Species of lizard

Liolaemus hajeki, also known commonly as Hajek's lizard and la lagartija de cuello liso de Hajek in Chilean Spanish, is a species of lizard in the family Liolaemidae. The species is endemic to Chile.

== Etymology ==
The specific name, hajeki, is in honor of Chilean biologist Ernst Hajek.

== Geographic range ==
L. hajeki is found in El Loa Province, Antofagasta Region, northern Chile.

== Habitat ==
The preferred natural habitat of L. hajeki is shrubland, at altitudes of 2,500–3,900 m (8,200–12,800 ft).

== Diet ==
L. hajeki preys upon insects.

== Reproduction ==
The mode of reproduction of L. hajeki is unknown.
