= Liolaemus yalguaraz =

Scientific classification
- Kingdom: Animalia
- Phylum: Chordata
- Class: Reptilia
- Order: Squamata
- Suborder: Iguania
- Family: Liolaemidae
- Genus: Liolaemus
- Species: L. yalguaraz

Binomial name
- Liolaemus yalguaraz Abdala, Quinteros, & Semham, 2015

Species of lizard

Liolaemus yalguaraz is a species of lizard in the family Iguanidae or the family Liolaemidae. The species is endemic to Argentina.
