= Liolaemus lopezi =

Conservation status
- Least Concern (IUCN 3.1)

Scientific classification
- Kingdom: Animalia
- Phylum: Chordata
- Class: Reptilia
- Order: Squamata
- Suborder: Iguania
- Family: Liolaemidae
- Genus: Liolaemus
- Species: L. lopezi

Binomial name
- Liolaemus lopezi Ibarra-Vidal, 2005

Species of lizard

Liolaemus lopezi is a species of lizard in the family Iguanidae. It is found in Chile, and more recently, El Salvador.
