= Liolaemus heliodermis =

Conservation status
- Least Concern (IUCN 3.1)

Scientific classification
- Kingdom: Animalia
- Phylum: Chordata
- Class: Reptilia
- Order: Squamata
- Suborder: Iguania
- Family: Liolaemidae
- Genus: Liolaemus
- Species: L. heliodermis

Binomial name
- Liolaemus heliodermis Espinoza, Lobo, & Cruz, 2000

Species of lizard

Liolaemus heliodermis is a species of lizard in the family Liolaemidae. It is native to Argentina.
