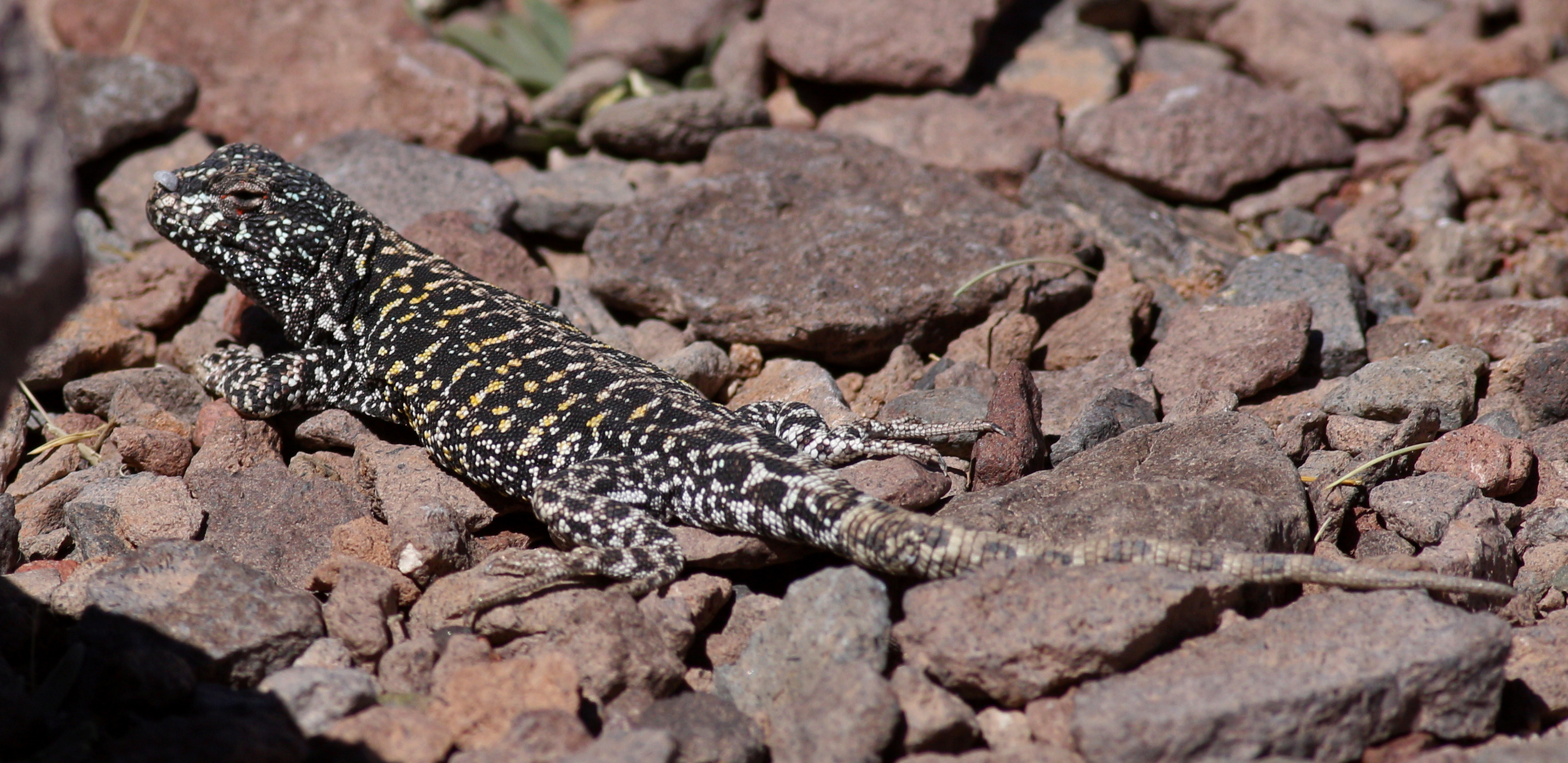

Conservation status
- Least Concern (IUCN 3.1)

Scientific classification
- Kingdom: Animalia
- Phylum: Chordata
- Class: Reptilia
- Order: Squamata
- Suborder: Iguania
- Family: Liolaemidae
- Genus: Liolaemus
- Species: L. gracielae

Binomial name
- Liolaemus gracielae Abdala, Acosta, Cabrera, Villavicencio & Marinero, 2009

= Liolaemus gracielae =

Species of lizard

Liolaemus gracielae is a species of lizard in the family Liolaemidae. The species is endemic to Argentina.

== Etymology ==
The specific name, gracielae, is in honor of Argentinian herpetologist Graciela Mirta Blanco.

== Geographic range ==
L. gracielae is found in La Rioja Province and San Juan Province, Argentina.

== Habitat ==
The preferred natural habitat of L. gracielae is grassland at altitudes of 4,000 m (13,000 ft) and higher.

== Description ==
Medium-sized for its genus, L. gracielae may attain a snout-to-vent length (SVL) of 7.7 cm (3.0 in).

== Reproduction ==
L. gracielae is viviparous.
