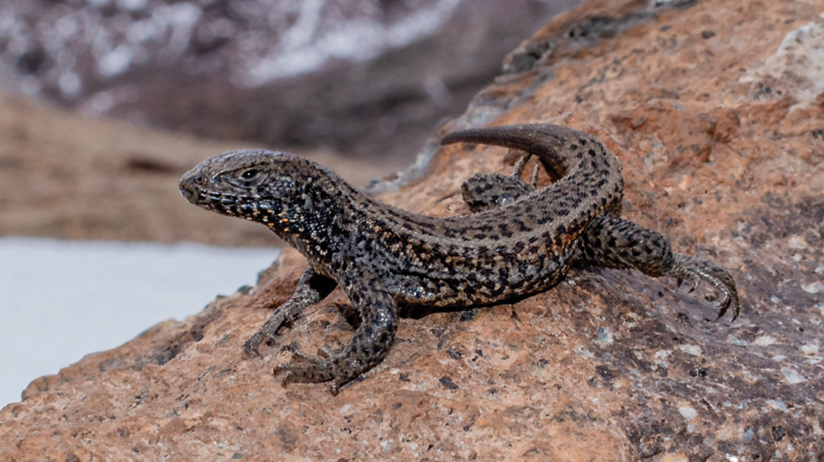

Conservation status
- Near Threatened (IUCN 3.1)

Scientific classification
- Kingdom: Animalia
- Phylum: Chordata
- Class: Reptilia
- Order: Squamata
- Suborder: Iguania
- Family: Liolaemidae
- Genus: Liolaemus
- Species: L. tacnae

Binomial name
- Liolaemus tacnae (Shreve, 1941)

= Liolaemus tacnae =

Species of lizard

Liolaemus tacnae is a species of lizard in the family Iguanidae or the family Liolaemidae. The species is endemic to Peru. It is notable for being found higher than any other reptile, having been photographed at 5400 metres above sea level.
