= Liolaemus millcayac =

Conservation status
- Least Concern (IUCN 3.1)

Scientific classification
- Kingdom: Animalia
- Phylum: Chordata
- Class: Reptilia
- Order: Squamata
- Suborder: Iguania
- Family: Liolaemidae
- Genus: Liolaemus
- Species: L. millcayac

Binomial name
- Liolaemus millcayac Abdala & Juárez-Heredia,, 2013

Species of lizard

Liolaemus millcayac is a species of lizard in the family Iguanidae. It is found in Argentina.
