= Liolaemus chungara =

Conservation status
- Least Concern (IUCN 3.1)

Scientific classification
- Kingdom: Animalia
- Phylum: Chordata
- Class: Reptilia
- Order: Squamata
- Suborder: Iguania
- Family: Liolaemidae
- Genus: Liolaemus
- Species: L. chungara

Binomial name
- Liolaemus chungara Quinteros, Valladares, Semham, Acosta, Barrionuevo, & Abdala, 2014

Species of lizard

Liolaemus chungara is a species of lizard in the family Liolaemidae. It is native to Chile.
