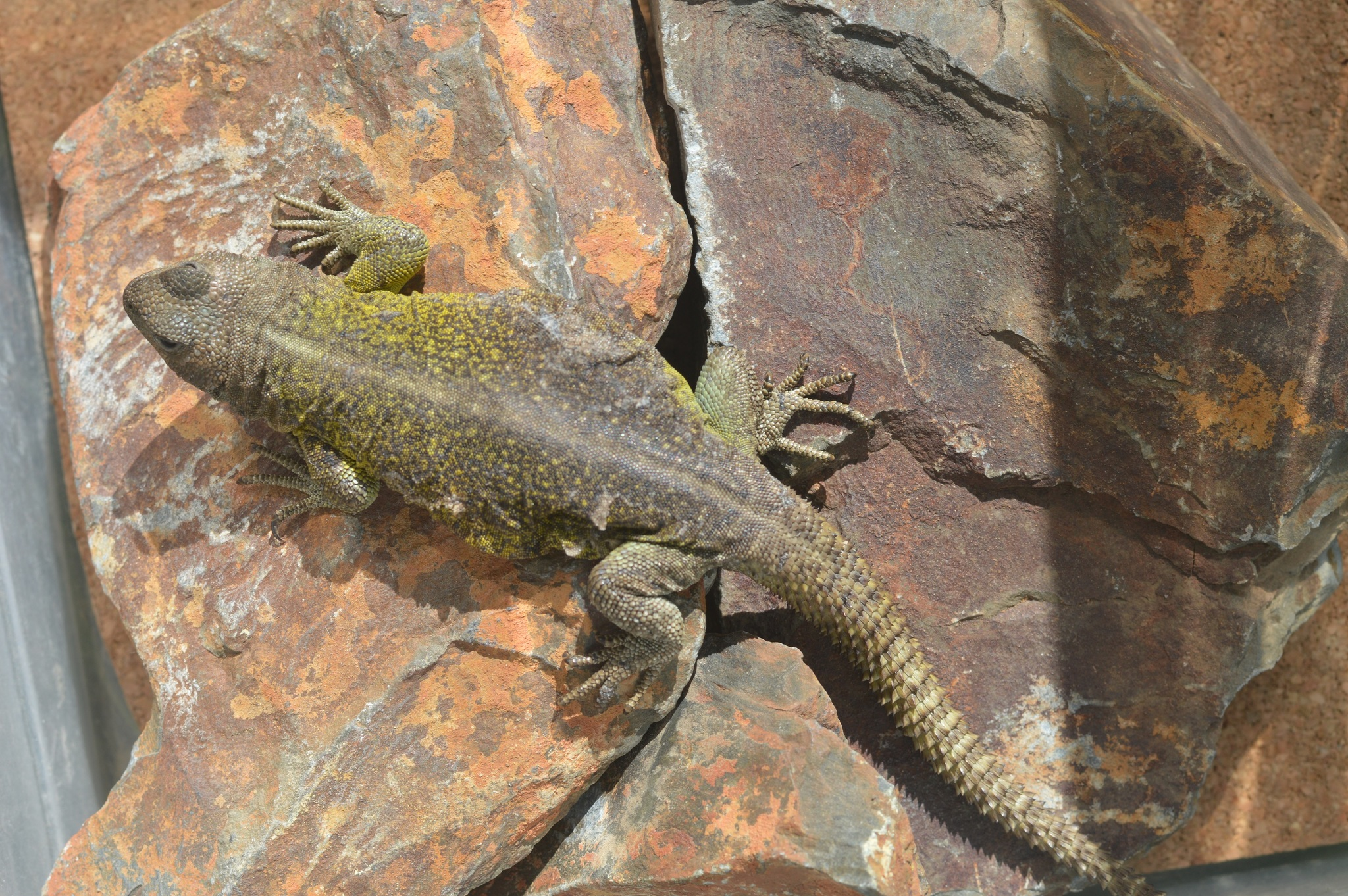
- A male Phymaturus mallimaccii

Conservation status
- Vulnerable (IUCN 3.1)

Scientific classification
- Kingdom: Animalia
- Phylum: Chordata
- Class: Reptilia
- Order: Squamata
- Suborder: Iguania
- Family: Liolaemidae
- Genus: Phymaturus
- Species: P. mallimaccii

Binomial name
- Phymaturus mallimaccii Cei, 1980

Synonyms
- Phymaturus mallimacci Cei, 1980; Centrura mallimacci (Cei, 1980)

= Phymaturus mallimaccii =

Species of lizard

Phymaturus mallimaccii, also known commonly as the thorntail mountain lizard, is a species of lizard in the family Liolaemidae. The species is endemic to Argentina.

== Etymology ==
The specific name, mallimaccii, is in honor of Argentinian geologist Hugo Salvador Mallimacci.

== Distribution ==
Phymaturus mallimaccii is found in the Sierra de Famatina, La Rioja Province, Argentina.

== Habitat ==
The preferred natural habitat of Phymaturus mallimaccii is grassland, at altitudes of 3,800–4,200 m (12,500–13,800 ft).

== Behavior ==
Phymaturus mallimaccii is terrestrial and saxicolous (rock-dwelling).

== Diet ==
A herbivorous species, Phymaturus mallimaccii eats flowers, especially those of the genera Hypochoeris and Werneria.

== Reproduction ==
The mode of reproduction of Phymaturus mallimaccii has been described as viviparous and as ovoviviparous.

== Taxonomy ==
Phymaturus mallimaccii is a member of the Phymaturus palluma species group.
