= Liolaemus scolaroi =

Conservation status
- Data Deficient (IUCN 3.1)

Scientific classification
- Kingdom: Animalia
- Phylum: Chordata
- Class: Reptilia
- Order: Squamata
- Suborder: Iguania
- Family: Liolaemidae
- Genus: Liolaemus
- Species: L. scolaroi

Binomial name
- Liolaemus scolaroi Pincheira-Donoso & Nunez, 2005

Species of lizard

Liolaemus scolaroi is a species of lizard in the family Iguanidae. It is from Chile and Argentina.
