= Liolaemus signifer =

Conservation status
- Near Threatened (IUCN 3.1)

Scientific classification
- Kingdom: Animalia
- Phylum: Chordata
- Class: Reptilia
- Order: Squamata
- Suborder: Iguania
- Family: Liolaemidae
- Genus: Liolaemus
- Species: L. signifer

Binomial name
- Liolaemus signifer (Duméril & Bibron, 1837)

Species of lizard

Liolaemus signifer, the zodiac tree iguana, is a species of lizard in the family Liolaemidae. It is native to Chile, Bolivia, and Peru.
