= Liolaemus tajzara =

Scientific classification
- Kingdom: Animalia
- Phylum: Chordata
- Class: Reptilia
- Order: Squamata
- Suborder: Iguania
- Family: Liolaemidae
- Genus: Liolaemus
- Species: L. tajzara

Binomial name
- Liolaemus tajzara Aguilar-Kirigin, 2019

Species of lizard

Liolaemus tajzara is a species of lizard in the family Iguanidae or the family Liolaemidae. The species is endemic to Bolivia.
