= Liolaemus yauri =

Scientific classification
- Kingdom: Animalia
- Phylum: Chordata
- Class: Reptilia
- Order: Squamata
- Suborder: Iguania
- Family: Liolaemidae
- Genus: Liolaemus
- Species: L. yauri

Binomial name
- Liolaemus yauri Arapa-Aquino, Abdala, Huamaní-Valderrama, Gutiérrez, Sardinia, Quiroz, & Chaparro, 2021

Species of lizard

Liolaemus yauri is a species of lizard in the family Iguanidae or the family Liolaemidae. The species is endemic to Peru.
