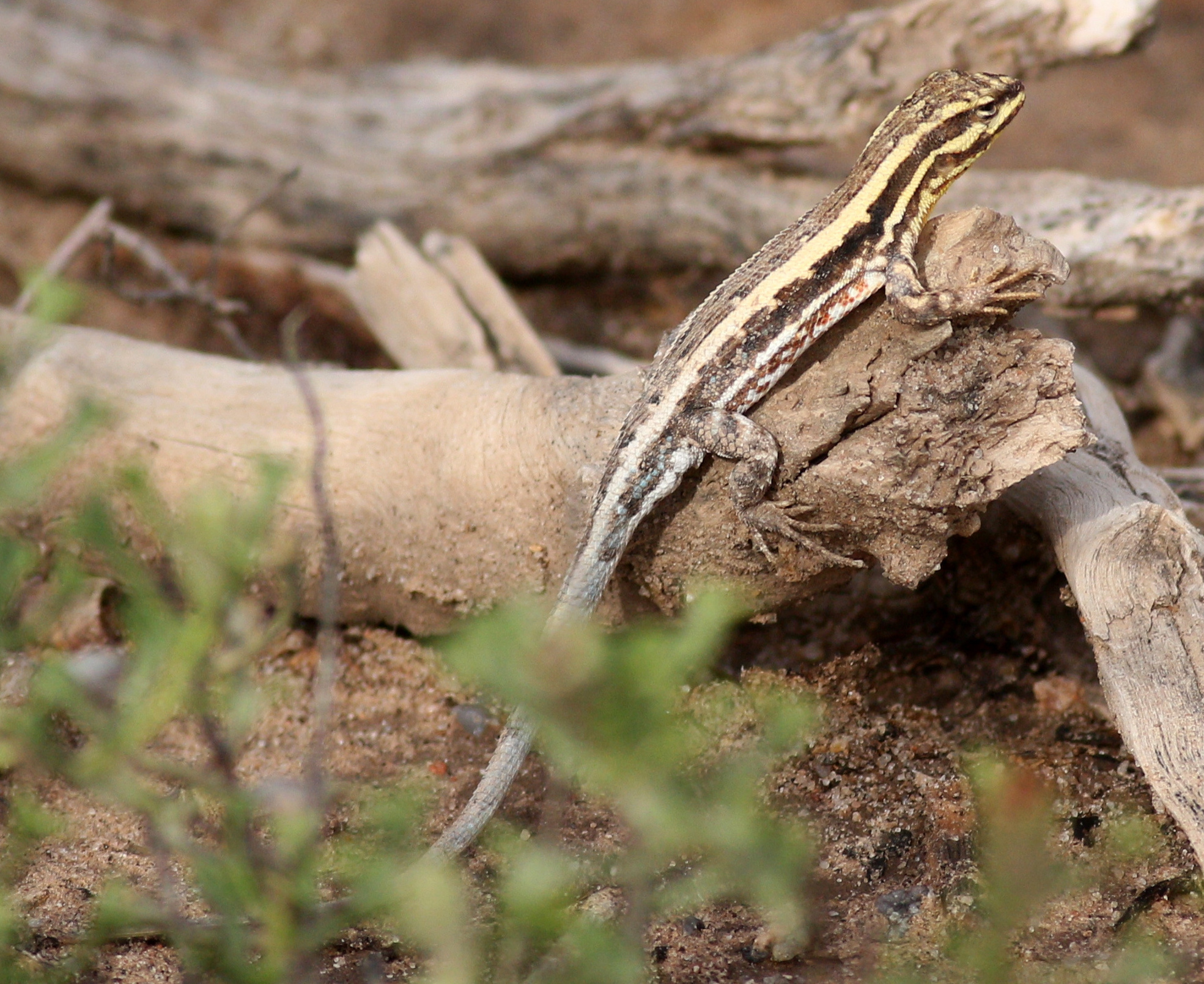

Conservation status
- Least Concern (IUCN 3.1)

Scientific classification
- Kingdom: Animalia
- Phylum: Chordata
- Class: Reptilia
- Order: Squamata
- Suborder: Iguania
- Family: Liolaemidae
- Genus: Liolaemus
- Species: L. chacoensis

Binomial name
- Liolaemus chacoensis Shreve, 1948

= Liolaemus chacoensis =

Species of lizard

Liolaemus chacoensis, the Chaco tree iguana, is a species of lizard in the family Liolaemidae. It is native to Paraguay, Bolivia, and Argentina.
