= Liolaemus lentus =

Conservation status
- Data Deficient (IUCN 3.1)

Scientific classification
- Kingdom: Animalia
- Phylum: Chordata
- Order: Squamata
- Suborder: Iguania
- Family: Liolaemidae
- Genus: Liolaemus
- Species: L. lentus

Binomial name
- Liolaemus lentus Gallardo, 1966

Species of lizard

Liolaemus lentus is a species of lizard in the family Iguanidae. It is found in Argentina.
