= Liolaemus gardeli =

Scientific classification
- Kingdom: Animalia
- Phylum: Chordata
- Class: Reptilia
- Order: Squamata
- Suborder: Iguania
- Family: Liolaemidae
- Genus: Liolaemus
- Species: L. gardeli

Binomial name
- Liolaemus gardeli Verrastro, Maneyro, Da Silva, & Farias, 2017

Species of lizard

Liolaemus gardeli is a species of lizard in the family Liolaemidae. It is native to Uruguay.
