= Liolaemus rothi =

Conservation status
- Least Concern (IUCN 3.1)

Scientific classification
- Kingdom: Animalia
- Phylum: Chordata
- Class: Reptilia
- Order: Squamata
- Suborder: Iguania
- Family: Liolaemidae
- Genus: Liolaemus
- Species: L. rothi

Binomial name
- Liolaemus rothi Koslowsky, 1898

Species of lizard

Liolaemus rothi, Roth's sand iguana or Roth's rock lizard, is a species of lizard in the family Liolaemidae. It is found in Argentina.
