= Liolaemus pagaburoi =

Conservation status
- Least Concern (IUCN 3.1)

Scientific classification
- Kingdom: Animalia
- Phylum: Chordata
- Class: Reptilia
- Order: Squamata
- Suborder: Iguania
- Family: Liolaemidae
- Genus: Liolaemus
- Species: L. pagaburoi

Binomial name
- Liolaemus pagaburoi Lobo & Espinoza, 1999

Species of lizard

Liolaemus pagaburoi is a species of lizard in the family Liolaemidae. The species is endemic to Argentina.

== Etymology ==
The specific name, pagaburoi, is in honor of Omar Pagaburo who collected natural history specimens in Argentina.

== Geographic distribution ==
Liolaemus pagaburoi is found in the Andes of northwestern Argentina, in the provinces of Catamarca and Tucumán.

== Habitat ==
The preferred natural habitat of Liolaemus pagaburoi is grassland, at elevations of 3,000–4,700 m (9,800–15,400 ft).

== Behavior ==
Liolaemus pagaburoi is diurnal and terrestrial.

== Reproduction ==
Liolaemus pagaburoi is viviparous (ovoviviparous).
