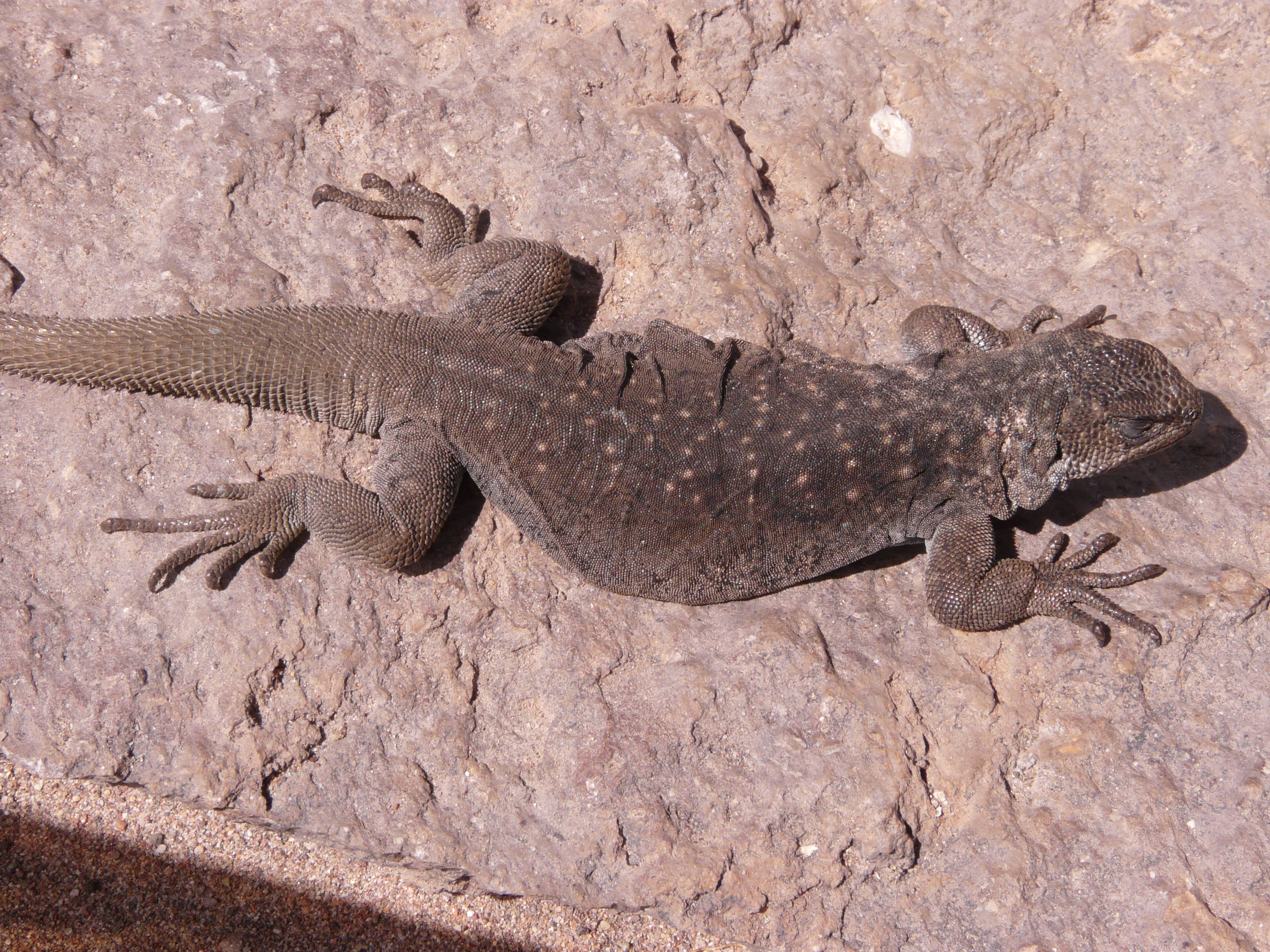

Conservation status
- Endangered (IUCN 3.1)

Scientific classification
- Kingdom: Animalia
- Phylum: Chordata
- Class: Reptilia
- Order: Squamata
- Suborder: Iguania
- Family: Liolaemidae
- Genus: Phymaturus
- Species: P. tenebrosus

Binomial name
- Phymaturus tenebrosus Lobo & Quinteros, 2005

= Phymaturus tenebrosus =

Species of lizard

Phymaturus tenebrosus is a species of lizard in the family Liolaemidae. It is from Argentina.
