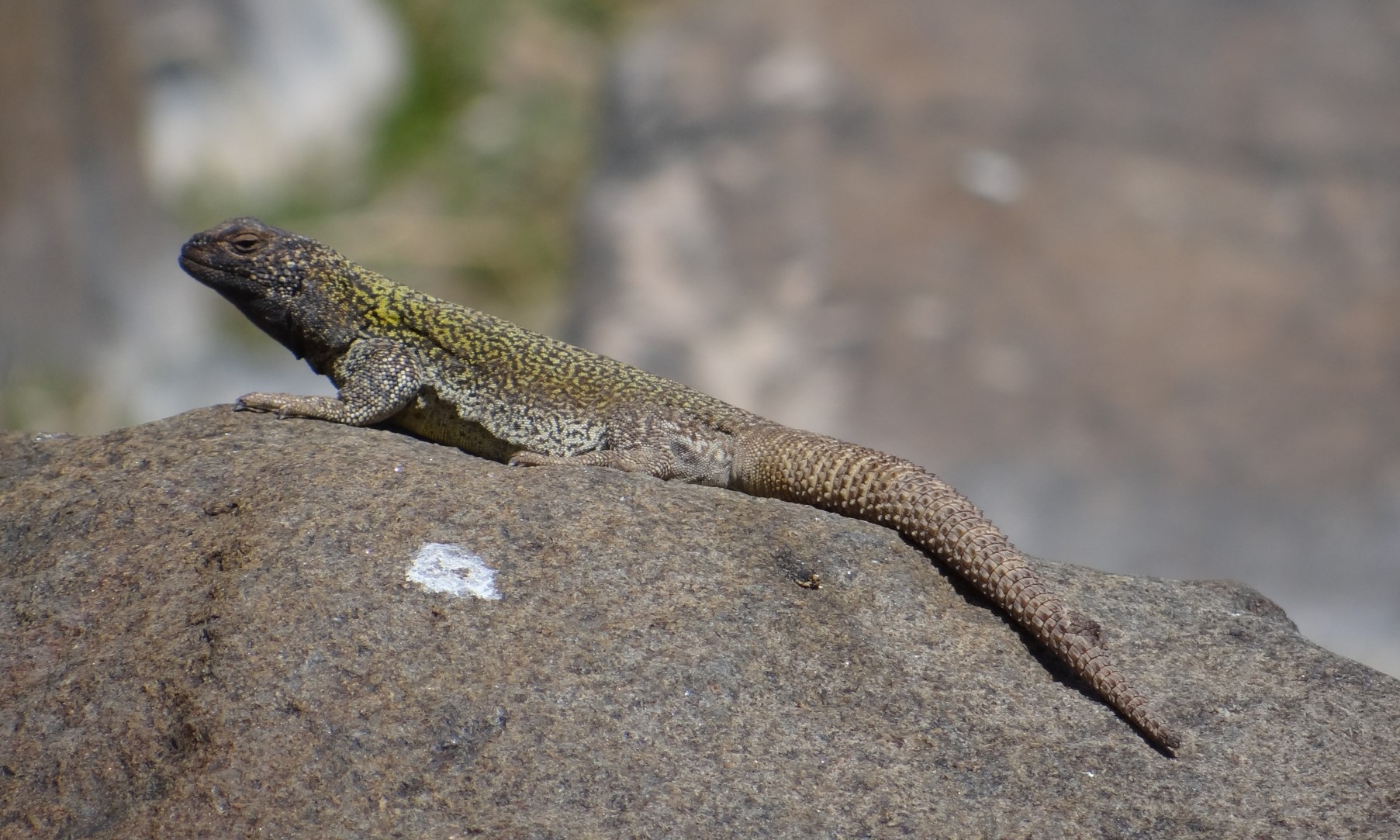

Conservation status
- Least Concern (IUCN 3.1)

Scientific classification
- Kingdom: Animalia
- Phylum: Chordata
- Class: Reptilia
- Order: Squamata
- Suborder: Iguania
- Family: Liolaemidae
- Genus: Phymaturus
- Species: P. extrilidus

Binomial name
- Phymaturus extrilidus Lobo, Espinoza, Sanabria, & Quiroga, 2012

= Phymaturus extrilidus =

Species of lizard

Phymaturus extrilidus is a species of lizard in the family Liolaemidae. It is found in Argentina.
