= Phymaturus manuelae =

Conservation status
- Data Deficient (IUCN 3.1)

Scientific classification
- Kingdom: Animalia
- Phylum: Chordata
- Class: Reptilia
- Order: Squamata
- Suborder: Iguania
- Family: Liolaemidae
- Genus: Phymaturus
- Species: P. manuelae

Binomial name
- Phymaturus manuelae Scolaro & Ibargüengoytía, 2008

Species of lizard

Phymaturus manuelae is a species of lizard in the family Liolaemidae. The species is endemic to Argentina.

== Etymology ==
The specific name, manuelae, is in honor of Manuela Martínez, the daughter of Nora Ibargüengoytía.

== Geographic range ==
Phymaturus manuelae is found in Río Negro Province, Argentina.

== Habitat ==
The preferred natural habitat of Phymaturus manuelae is rocky areas of shrubland, at altitudes around 950 m (3,120 ft).

== Reproduction ==
Phymaturus manuelae bears live young, by ovoviviparity.
