= Phymaturus denotatus =

Conservation status
- Least Concern (IUCN 3.1)

Scientific classification
- Kingdom: Animalia
- Phylum: Chordata
- Class: Reptilia
- Order: Squamata
- Suborder: Iguania
- Family: Liolaemidae
- Genus: Phymaturus
- Species: P. denotatus

Binomial name
- Phymaturus denotatus Lobo, Nenda, & Slodki, 2012

Species of lizard

Phymaturus denotatus is a species of lizard in the family Liolaemidae. It is from Argentina.
