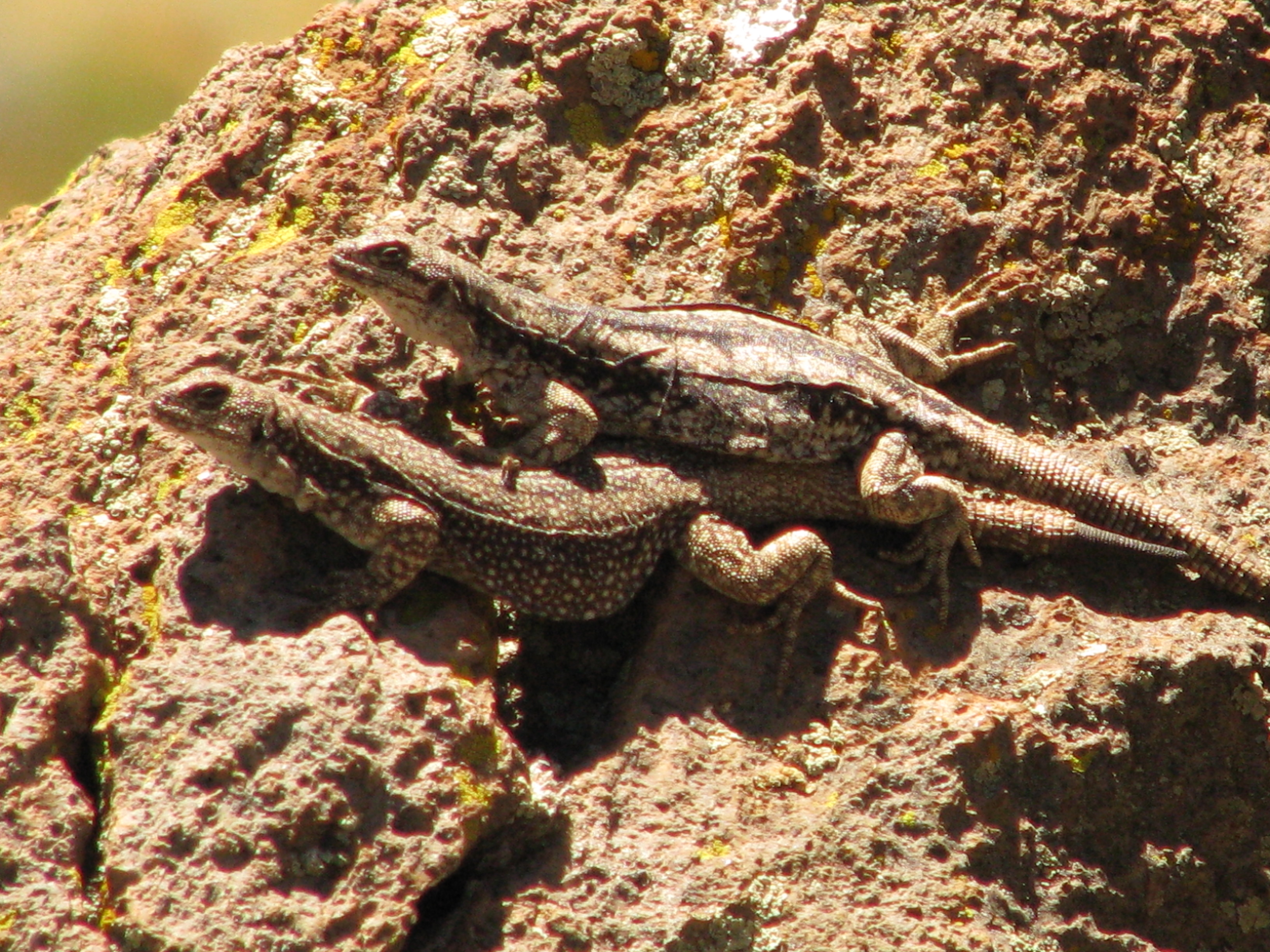

Conservation status
- Near Threatened (IUCN 3.1)

Scientific classification
- Kingdom: Animalia
- Phylum: Chordata
- Class: Reptilia
- Order: Squamata
- Suborder: Iguania
- Family: Liolaemidae
- Genus: Phymaturus
- Species: P. payuniae

Binomial name
- Phymaturus payuniae Cei & Castro, 1973

= Phymaturus payuniae =

Species of lizard

Phymaturus payuniae is a species of lizard in the family Liolaemidae. It is from Argentina.
