= Phymaturus ceii =

Conservation status
- Least Concern (IUCN 3.1)

Scientific classification
- Kingdom: Animalia
- Phylum: Chordata
- Class: Reptilia
- Order: Squamata
- Suborder: Iguania
- Family: Liolaemidae
- Genus: Phymaturus
- Species: P. ceii

Binomial name
- Phymaturus ceii Scolaro & Ibargüengoyía, 2007

Species of lizard

Phymaturus ceii is a species of lizard in the family Liolaemidae. It is from Argentina.
