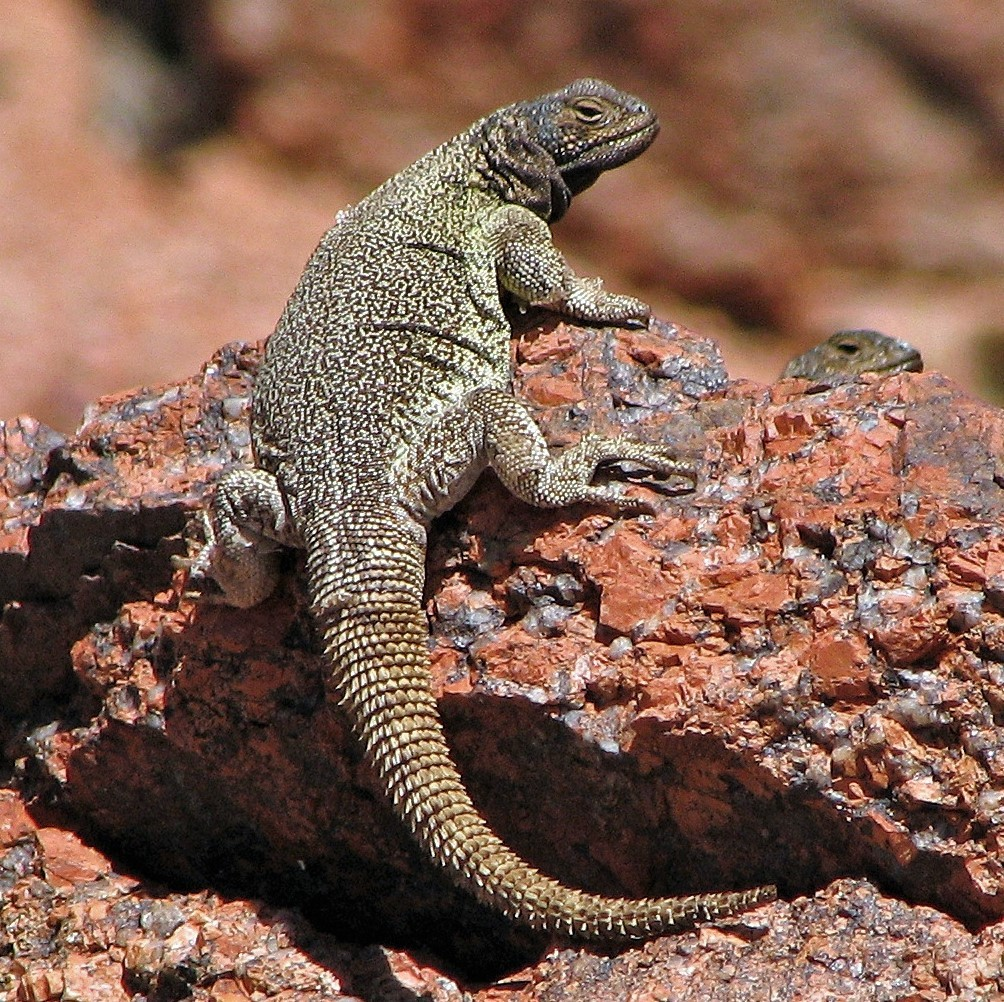

Conservation status
- Near Threatened (IUCN 3.1)

Scientific classification
- Kingdom: Animalia
- Phylum: Chordata
- Class: Reptilia
- Order: Squamata
- Suborder: Iguania
- Family: Liolaemidae
- Genus: Phymaturus
- Species: P. punae

Binomial name
- Phymaturus punae Cei, Etheridge, & Videla, 1985

= Phymaturus punae =

Species of lizard

Phymaturus punae, Cei's mountain lizard, is a species of lizard in the family Liolaemidae. It is from Argentina.
