= Phymaturus cacivioi =

Scientific classification
- Kingdom: Animalia
- Phylum: Chordata
- Class: Reptilia
- Order: Squamata
- Suborder: Iguania
- Family: Liolaemidae
- Genus: Phymaturus
- Species: P. cacivioi

Binomial name
- Phymaturus cacivioi Lobo & Nenda, 2015

Species of lizard

Phymaturus cacivioi is a species of lizard in the family Liolaemidae. It is from Argentina.
