= Phymaturus maulense =

Conservation status
- Least Concern (IUCN 3.1)

Scientific classification
- Kingdom: Animalia
- Phylum: Chordata
- Class: Reptilia
- Order: Squamata
- Suborder: Iguania
- Family: Liolaemidae
- Genus: Phymaturus
- Species: P. maulense

Binomial name
- Phymaturus maulense Núñez, Veloso, Espejo, Veloso, Cortés, & Araya, 2010

Species of lizard

Phymaturus maulense is a species of lizard in the family Liolaemidae. It is from Chile.
