= Phymaturus delheyi =

Conservation status
- Least Concern (IUCN 3.1)

Scientific classification
- Kingdom: Animalia
- Phylum: Chordata
- Class: Reptilia
- Order: Squamata
- Suborder: Iguania
- Family: Liolaemidae
- Genus: Phymaturus
- Species: P. delheyi

Binomial name
- Phymaturus delheyi Avila, Perez, Perez, & Morando, 2011

Species of lizard

Phymaturus delheyi is a ground-dwelling species of lizard in the family Liolaemidae. It is found in the dry, rocky environment of central Argentina.
