= Phymaturus aguedae =

Conservation status
- Data Deficient (IUCN 3.1)

Scientific classification
- Kingdom: Animalia
- Phylum: Chordata
- Class: Reptilia
- Order: Squamata
- Suborder: Iguania
- Family: Liolaemidae
- Genus: Phymaturus
- Species: P. aguedae

Binomial name
- Phymaturus aguedae Troncoso-Palacios & Esquerré, 2014

Species of lizard

Phymaturus aguedae, Agueda's rocky lizard, is a species of lizard in the family Liolaemidae. It is from Chile.
