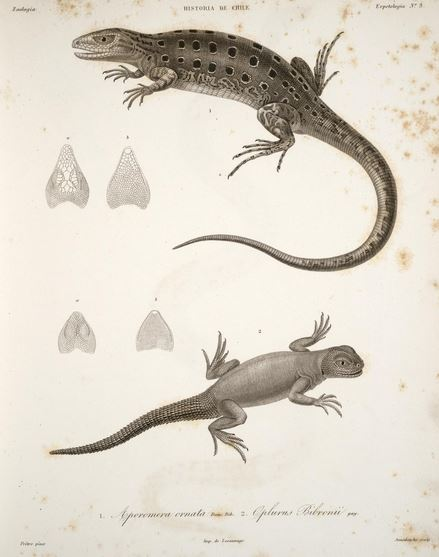

Conservation status
- Endangered (IUCN 3.1)

Scientific classification
- Kingdom: Animalia
- Phylum: Chordata
- Class: Reptilia
- Order: Squamata
- Suborder: Iguania
- Family: Liolaemidae
- Genus: Phymaturus
- Species: P. bibronii

Binomial name
- Phymaturus bibronii (Guichenot, 1848)

= Phymaturus bibronii =

Species of lizard

Phymaturus bibronii is a species of lizard in the family Liolaemidae. It is from Chile.
