= Phymaturus curivilcun =

Scientific classification
- Kingdom: Animalia
- Phylum: Chordata
- Class: Reptilia
- Order: Squamata
- Suborder: Iguania
- Family: Liolaemidae
- Genus: Phymaturus
- Species: P. curivilcun

Binomial name
- Phymaturus curivilcun Scolaro, Corbalán, Tappari, & Streitenberger, 2016

Species of lizard

Phymaturus curivilcun is a species of lizard in the family Liolaemidae. It is from Argentina.
