= Phymaturus tromen =

Scientific classification
- Kingdom: Animalia
- Phylum: Chordata
- Class: Reptilia
- Order: Squamata
- Suborder: Iguania
- Family: Liolaemidae
- Genus: Phymaturus
- Species: P. tromen

Binomial name
- Phymaturus tromen Lobo & Nenda, 2015

Species of lizard

Phymaturus tromen is a species of lizard in the family Liolaemidae. It is from Argentina.
