= Phymaturus loboi =

Scientific classification
- Kingdom: Animalia
- Phylum: Chordata
- Class: Reptilia
- Order: Squamata
- Suborder: Iguania
- Family: Liolaemidae
- Genus: Phymaturus
- Species: P. loboi

Binomial name
- Phymaturus loboi Troncoso-Palacios, Ferri-Yanez, Laspiur, & Aguilar, 2019

Species of lizard

Phymaturus loboi, Lobo's rocky lizard, is a species of lizard in the family Liolaemidae. It is from Chile.
