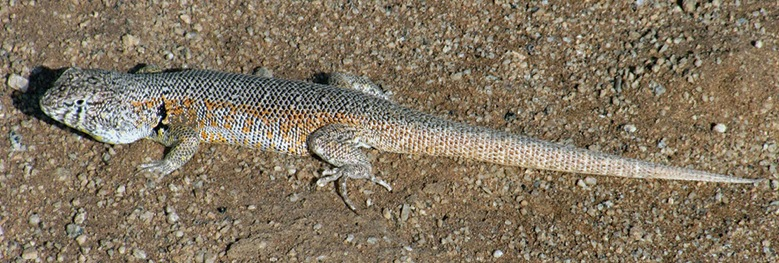

Conservation status
- Least Concern (IUCN 3.1)

Scientific classification
- Kingdom: Animalia
- Phylum: Chordata
- Class: Reptilia
- Order: Squamata
- Suborder: Iguania
- Family: Liolaemidae
- Genus: Liolaemus
- Species: L. nigromaculatus

Binomial name
- Liolaemus nigromaculatus Wiegmann, 1834

= Liolaemus nigromaculatus =

Species of lizard

Liolaemus nigromaculatus is a species of tree iguana endemic to the Chilean matorral ecoregion within Chile. The species was first described in 1834, by Arend Friedrich August Wiegmann and was later redescribed in 2013 by Chilean biologists.
