= Phymaturus timi =

Scientific classification
- Kingdom: Animalia
- Phylum: Chordata
- Class: Reptilia
- Order: Squamata
- Suborder: Iguania
- Family: Liolaemidae
- Genus: Phymaturus
- Species: P. timi

Binomial name
- Phymaturus timi Hibbard, Nenda, & Lobo, 2019

Species of lizard

Phymaturus timi is a species of lizard in the family Liolaemidae. It is from Argentina.
