= Phymaturus vociferator =

Conservation status
- Vulnerable (IUCN 3.1)

Scientific classification
- Kingdom: Animalia
- Phylum: Chordata
- Class: Reptilia
- Order: Squamata
- Suborder: Iguania
- Family: Liolaemidae
- Genus: Phymaturus
- Species: P. vociferator

Binomial name
- Phymaturus vociferator Pincheira-Donoso, 2004

Species of lizard

Phymaturus vociferator is a species of lizard in the family Liolaemidae. It is from Chile.
