= Phymaturus niger =

Scientific classification
- Kingdom: Animalia
- Phylum: Chordata
- Class: Reptilia
- Order: Squamata
- Suborder: Iguania
- Family: Liolaemidae
- Genus: Phymaturus
- Species: P. niger

Binomial name
- Phymaturus niger Lobo, Barrasso, Hibbard, Quipildor, Slodki, Valdecantos, & Basso, 2021

Species of lizard

Phymaturus niger is a species of lizard in the family Liolaemidae. It is from Argentina.
