= Phymaturus maquinchao =

Scientific classification
- Kingdom: Animalia
- Phylum: Chordata
- Class: Reptilia
- Order: Squamata
- Suborder: Iguania
- Family: Liolaemidae
- Genus: Phymaturus
- Species: P. maquinchao

Binomial name
- Phymaturus maquinchao Lobo, Barrasso, Valdecantos, Giraudo, Di Pietro, & Basso. 2022

Species of lizard

Phymaturus maquinchao is a species of lizard in the family Liolaemidae. It is from Argentina.
