= Phymaturus indistinctus =

Conservation status
- Data Deficient (IUCN 3.1)

Scientific classification
- Kingdom: Animalia
- Phylum: Chordata
- Class: Reptilia
- Order: Squamata
- Suborder: Iguania
- Family: Liolaemidae
- Genus: Phymaturus
- Species: P. indistinctus

Binomial name
- Phymaturus indistinctus Cei & Castro, 1973

Species of lizard

Phymaturus indistinctus is a species of herbivorous lizard in the family Liolaemidae. It is from Argentina.
