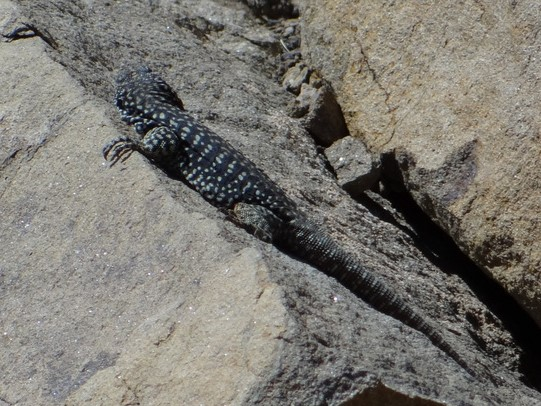

Scientific classification
- Kingdom: Animalia
- Phylum: Chordata
- Class: Reptilia
- Order: Squamata
- Suborder: Iguania
- Family: Liolaemidae
- Genus: Phymaturus
- Species: P. rahuensis

Binomial name
- Phymaturus rahuensis Gonzalez-Marin, Fulvio-Perez, Minoli, Morando, & Avila, 2016

= Phymaturus rahuensis =

Species of lizard

Phymaturus rahuensis is a species of lizard in the family Liolaemidae. It is from Argentina.
