= Phymaturus katenke =

Scientific classification
- Kingdom: Animalia
- Phylum: Chordata
- Class: Reptilia
- Order: Squamata
- Suborder: Iguania
- Family: Liolaemidae
- Genus: Phymaturus
- Species: P. katenke

Binomial name
- Phymaturus katenke Scolaro, Corbalan, Obregon Streitenberger, & Tappari, 2021

Species of lizard

Phymaturus katenke, Muchagua's lizard, is a species of lizard in the family Liolaemidae. It is from Argentina.
