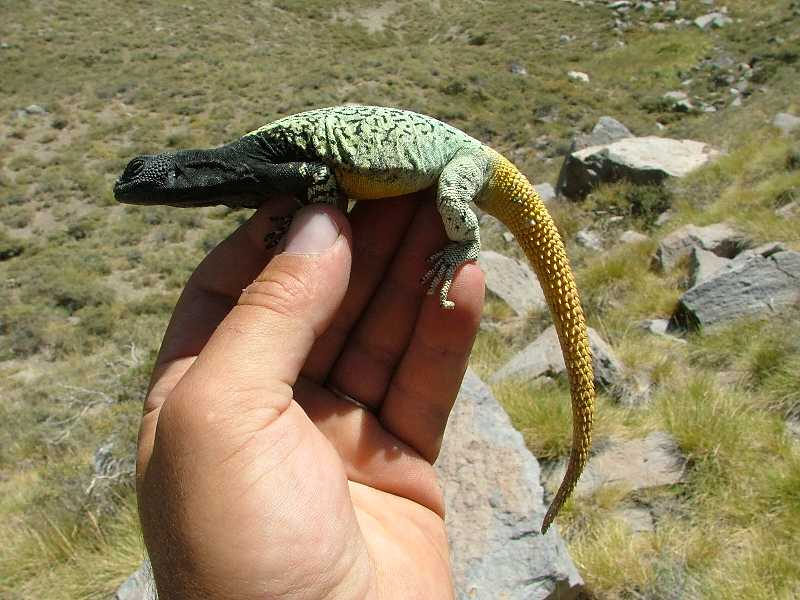
- Adult male of Phymaturus verdugo

Scientific classification
- Kingdom: Animalia
- Phylum: Chordata
- Class: Reptilia
- Order: Squamata
- Suborder: Iguania
- Family: Liolaemidae
- Genus: Phymaturus; Gravenhorst, 1838

Diversity
- 52 species

Synonyms
- Centrura Bell, 1843

= Phymaturus =

Genus of lizards

Phymaturus is a genus of iguanian lizards of the family Liolaemidae, a family which was traditionally included in the Iguanidae as a subfamily, but more recently was proposed to warrant family status in the Liolaemidae. Phymaturus is the mid-sized genus of its family, with 50 species altogether known as of 2021; new species are still being discovered, however.

Species of the genus Phymaturus are found in the Andes region south to Patagonia and inhabit a variety of habitats. Their habits are mostly conserved from the ancestral iguanians, in that Phymaturus are generally inhabitants of rocky ground, feed on plants, and give birth to fully developed young.

== Systematics ==
The genus can be divided into two lineages, which probably represent clades:

palluma group

Superciliar scales not imbricate, more than four subocular scales, 3-4 rows of lorilabial scales, mental scale narrower than rostral scale and usually touching the sublabial scales. Tail spines well-developed, two annuli per segment.

- Phymaturus aguanegra Lobo, Laspiur & Acosta, 2013
- Phymaturus aguedae Troncoso-Palacios & Esquerré, 2014
- Phymaturus alicahuense Núñez et al., 2010
- Phymaturus antofagastensis Pereyra, 1985
- Phymaturus bibronii (Guichenot, 1848)
- Phymaturus darwini Núñez et al., 2010
- Phymaturus denotatus Lobo, Nenda & Slodki, 2012
- Phymaturus dorsimaculatus Lobo & Quinteros, 2005
- Phymaturus extrilidus Lobo et al., 2012
- Phymaturus laurenti Lobo, Abdala & Valdecantos, 2010
- Phymaturus loboi Troncoso-Palacios, Ferri-Yáñez, Laspiur & Aguilar, 2019
- Phymaturus mallimaccii Cei, 1980
- Phymaturus maulense Núñez et al., 2010
- Phymaturus palluma (Molina, 1782)
- Phymaturus punae Cei, Etheridge & Videla, 1985
- Phymaturus querque Lobo, Abdala & Valdecantos, 2010
- Phymaturus roigorum Lobo & Abdala, 2007
- Phymaturus timi Hibbard, Nenda & Lobo, 2019
- Phymaturus tromen Lobo & Nenda, 2015
- Phymaturus verdugo Cei & Videla, 2003
- Phymaturus vociferator Pincheira-Donoso, 2004
- Phymaturus williamsi Lobo, Laspiur & Acosta, 2013

patagonicus group

Superciliar scales elongate and overlapping, one usually unfragmented subocular scale, tail smooth, Meckel's groove fused and closed.

- Phymaturus cacivioi Lobo & Nenda, 2015
- Phymaturus calcogaster Scolaro & Cei, 2003
- Phymaturus camilae Scolaro, Jara & Pincheira-Donoso, 2013
- Phymaturus castillensis Scolaro & Pincheira-Donoso, 2010
- Phymaturus ceii Scolaro & Ibargüengoytía, 2007
- Phymaturus chenqueniyen Lobo, Barrasso, Valdecantos, Giraudo, Di Pietro & Basso, 2022
- Phymaturus curivilcun Scolaro et al., 2016
- Phymaturus delheyi Ávila et al., 2011
- Phymaturus desuetus Scolaro & Tappari, 2009
- Phymaturus etheridgei Lobo, Abdala & Valdecantos, 2010
- Phymaturus felixi Lobo, Abdala & Valdecantos, 2010
- Phymaturus indistinctus Cei & Castro, 1973
- Phymaturus katenke Scolaro, Corbalán, Obregón Streitenberger & Tappari, 2021
- Phymaturus manuelae Scalaro & Ibargüengoytía, 2008
- Phymaturus maquinchao Lobo, Barrasso, Valdecantos, Giraudo, Di Pietro & Basso. 2022
- Phymaturus nevadoi Cei & Castro, 1973
- Phymaturus niger Lobo, Barrasso, Hibbard, Quipildor, Slodki, Valdecantos & Basso, 2021
- Phymaturus patagonicus Koslowsky, 1898
- Phymaturus payuniae Cei & Castro, 1973
- Phymaturus robustus Lobo, Barrasso, Hibbard, Quipildor, Slodki, Valdecantos & Basso, 2021
- Phymaturus sinervoi Scolaro, Méndez-de la Cruz & Ibargüengoytía, 2012
- Phymaturus sitesi Ávila et al., 2011
- Phymaturus somuncurensis Cei & Castro, 1973
- Phymaturus spurcus Barbour 1921
- Phymaturus tenebrosus Lobo & Quinteros, 2005
- Phymaturus videlai Scolaro & Pincheira-Donoso, 2010
- Phymaturus yachanana Ávila, Perez, Minoli & Morando, 2014
- Phymaturus zapalensis Cei & Castro, 1973

More species which may or may not belong to the aforementioned species groups:

- Phymaturus fiambala Lobo, Hibbard, Quipildor & Valdecantos, 2019
- Phymaturus rahuensis González-Marín et al., 2016

Nota bene: A binomial authority in parentheses indicates that the species was originally described in a genus other than Phymaturus.
