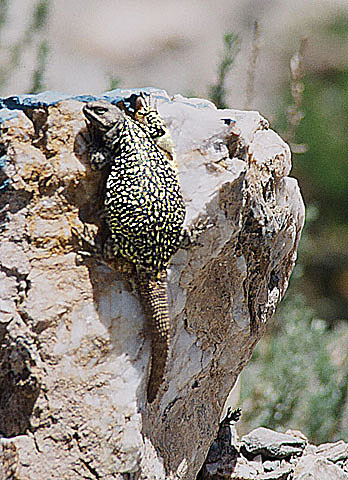

Conservation status
- Least Concern (IUCN 3.1)

Scientific classification
- Kingdom: Animalia
- Phylum: Chordata
- Class: Reptilia
- Order: Squamata
- Suborder: Iguania
- Family: Liolaemidae
- Genus: Phymaturus
- Species: P. palluma

Binomial name
- Phymaturus palluma (Molina, 1782)

= Phymaturus palluma =

Species of lizard

Phymaturus palluma, the high mountain lizard, is a species of lizard in the family Liolaemidae. It is found in Chile and Argentina.
