= Ctenoblepharys adspersa =

Conservation status
- Vulnerable (IUCN 3.1)

Scientific classification
- Kingdom: Animalia
- Phylum: Chordata
- Class: Reptilia
- Order: Squamata
- Suborder: Iguania
- Family: Liolaemidae
- Genus: Ctenoblepharys; Tschudi, 1845
- Species: C. adspersa

Binomial name
- Ctenoblepharys adspersa Tschudi, 1845

Species of lizard

Ctenoblepharys adspersa is a liolaemid lizard within the monotypic genus Ctenoblepharys. It is endemic to the arid western coast of Peru. It is locally known as cabezona.

The species is secretive and arenicolous, meaning that it inhabits sandy areas. It is primarily found along coastal sand dunes and beaches, but also hyper-arid habitats, ephemeral streambeds, and Tillandsia groves further inland, as far as the Andean foothills. Much of its biology and ecology is unknown, though it is known to be oviparous (egg-laying) and excavates burrows up to a meter in length. It feeds on a wide variety of insects, the most common being hymenopterans (wasps, ants, etc.), followed by coleopterans (beetles) and insect larvae. Activity levels are greatest in the morning (9–11 AM) and in the afternoon (3–4 PM).

Compared to other liolaemids, it has a fairly broad head and large eyes, along with numerous unique skeletal features. Scales are generally small and granular, rather than overlapping. Elongated ciliary scales above the eyes are responsible for its genus name, which is Greek for "eyelash comb". The limbs are fairly slender and the tail is longer than the body. It is a moderately-sized lizard, with a maximum snout-to-vent length (SVL) of 7.5 cm (3 inches), not including the tail. The species is well-camouflaged on sand: coloration is a series of white speckles on a backdrop of light and dark brown transverse bars.

Ctenoblepharys adspersa is rare and does not appear to be tolerant of human disturbance. Urban development and expansion of resort towns and the Lima Metropolitan Area have led to population fragmentation along a large portion of the species' native range. Continued development and habitat loss will lead to further pressure on the species, as will climate change. Due to its limited range, fragmented population, and habitat degradation, it has been rated as Vulnerable on the IUCN Red List since 2014. It occurs in a few protected areas, including Lomas de Lachay and Paracas National Reserve.
