= Phymaturus laurenti =

Conservation status
- Least Concern (IUCN 3.1)

Scientific classification
- Kingdom: Animalia
- Phylum: Chordata
- Class: Reptilia
- Order: Squamata
- Suborder: Iguania
- Family: Liolaemidae
- Genus: Phymaturus
- Species: P. laurenti

Binomial name
- Phymaturus laurenti Lobo, Abdala, & Valdecantos, 2010

Species of lizard

Phymaturus laurenti is a species of lizard in the family Liolaemidae. It is from Argentina.

== Distribution and habitat ==
This species is endemic to the province of Catamarca in Argentina. It is found between 3,500 and 4,500 m above sea level. It lives in the puna.
