= Liolaemus darwinii =

Conservation status
- Least Concern (IUCN 3.1)

Scientific classification
- Kingdom: Animalia
- Phylum: Chordata
- Class: Reptilia
- Order: Squamata
- Suborder: Iguania
- Family: Liolaemidae
- Genus: Liolaemus
- Species: L. darwinii

Binomial name
- Liolaemus darwinii (Bell, 1843)
- Range map

Synonyms
- Proctotretus darwinii Bell, 1843; Liolaemus darwinii — Gray, 1845; Eulaemus darwinii — Girard, 1857; Liolaemus darwinii — Boulenger, 1885

Species of lizard

Liolaemus darwinii, commonly known as Darwin's tree iguana, is a species of lizard in the family Liolaemidae. It is endemic to Argentina.

== Etymology ==
The specific name, darwinii, is in honor of English naturalist Charles Darwin, the author of On the Origin of Species.

== Habitat ==
The preferred natural habitat of L. darwinii is shrubland, at altitudes from sea level to 3,000 m (9,800 ft).

== Description ==
The males of L. darwinii are brown with two yellow dorsal stripes that run along the spine, one on each side of the back. The females are solely brown.

== Diet ==
L. darwinii eats various insects 5 cm (2.0 in) or less in length, including beetles and locusts.

== Behavior ==
L. darwinii is diurnal. During nights and cold days, it burrows underground. It is a solitary and territorial. Males and females compete for territory.

== Reproduction ==
L. darwinii is oviparous. The mating season is in mid-February, and the nesting time is eight months later. The hatchlings are 5 cm (2.0 in) long, and clutch size is typically between 10 and 12.
