= Raymond Laurent =

Belgian herpetologist

Raymond Ferdinand Louis-Philippe Laurent (16 May 1917 – 3 February 2005) was a Belgian herpetologist, who specialized in African and South American amphibians and reptiles. He published more than 200 scientific articles and book chapters. Several species have been named after him, most recently Phymaturus laurenti in 2010. Additional species of reptiles named in his honor include Chironius laurenti, Liolaemus laurenti, and Mehelya laurenti.
