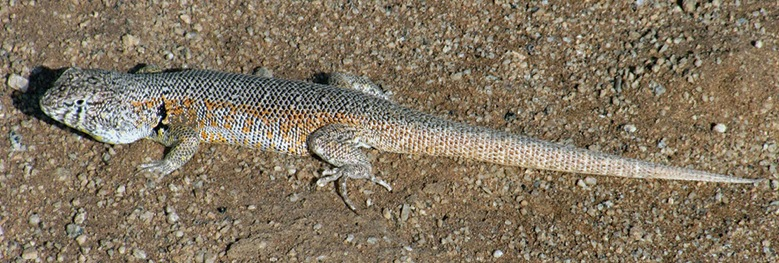
- Liolaemus nigromaculatus

Scientific classification
- Kingdom: Animalia
- Phylum: Chordata
- Class: Reptilia
- Order: Squamata
- Suborder: Iguania
- Family: Liolaemidae
- Genus: Liolaemus; Wiegmann, 1834

Type species
- Liolaemus nigromaculatus Wiegmann, 1834

Subgenera
- Liolaemus (Liolaemus); Liolaemus (Eulaemus)

= Liolaemus =

Genus of lizards

Liolaemus, whose members are known colloquially as tree iguanas, is a genus of iguanian lizards, containing many species, all of which are endemic to South America.

== Description ==
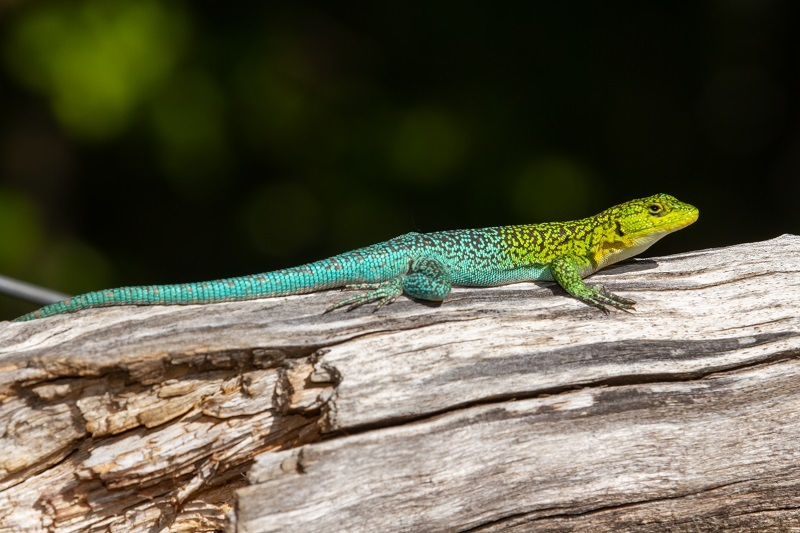
L. tenuis

Members of the genus Liolaemus form a dominant part of the lizard fauna of the southern part of the continent of South America, and vary considerably in size (45–100 millimetres or 1.8–3.9 inches snout–vent length) and weight (3–200 grams or 0.1–7.1 ounces).

== Geographic range ==
Liolaemus species are found in the Andes and adjacent lowlands, from Peru to Tierra del Fuego, at altitudes that can exceed 4,500 metres (14,800 ft). The genus has been recorded at 5,400 m (17,700 ft) above sea level on Chachani mountain, which is the highest recorded altitude for any reptile species.

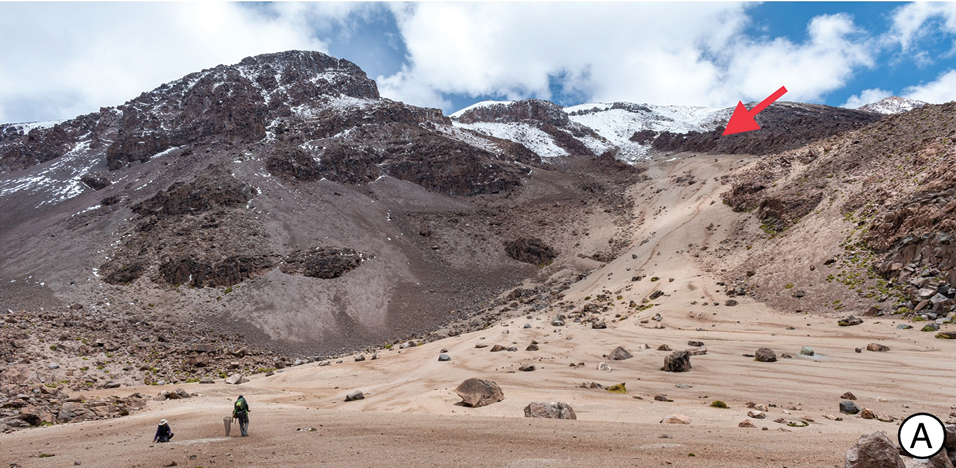
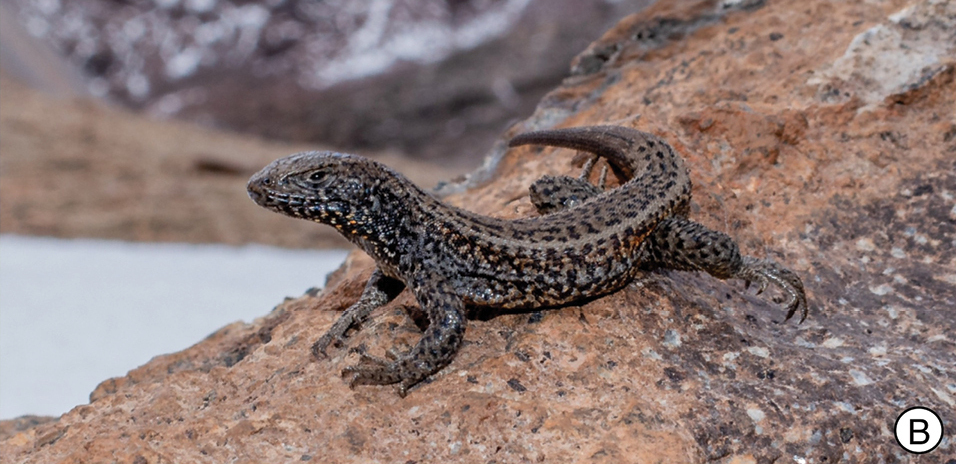
Liolaemus aff. tacnae, photographed at 5,400 metres (17,700 feet) above sea level on Chachani mountain. This is the highest-altitude record for a reptile. Place of photography marked by a red arrow.

Liolaemus magellanicus and Liolaemus sarmientoi are the world's southernmost reptiles, living as far south as Isla Grande de Tierra del Fuego and the northern shores of the Strait of Magellan respectively.

== Diet ==
Most species of Liolaemus are omnivorous, but a few purely insectivorous and herbivorous species are known.

== Species ==
There are more than 225 described species in the genus Liolaemus, but the true number of species may be about double this number. Liolaemus is by far the largest genus of the liolaemid lizards, which are traditionally treated as subfamily Liolaeminae within the Iguanidae but more recently were proposed for upranking to full family Liolaemidae. There are many examples of taxonomic splitting within this genus which is largely due to both phylogenetic pitfalls and an effort to obtain conservation status.

== Pets ==
Some species of Liolaemus have been recently kept as pets, and as many of them originate from regions that experience cold conditions, they are named "snow swifts". More generally, the genus is known as "tree iguanas".
