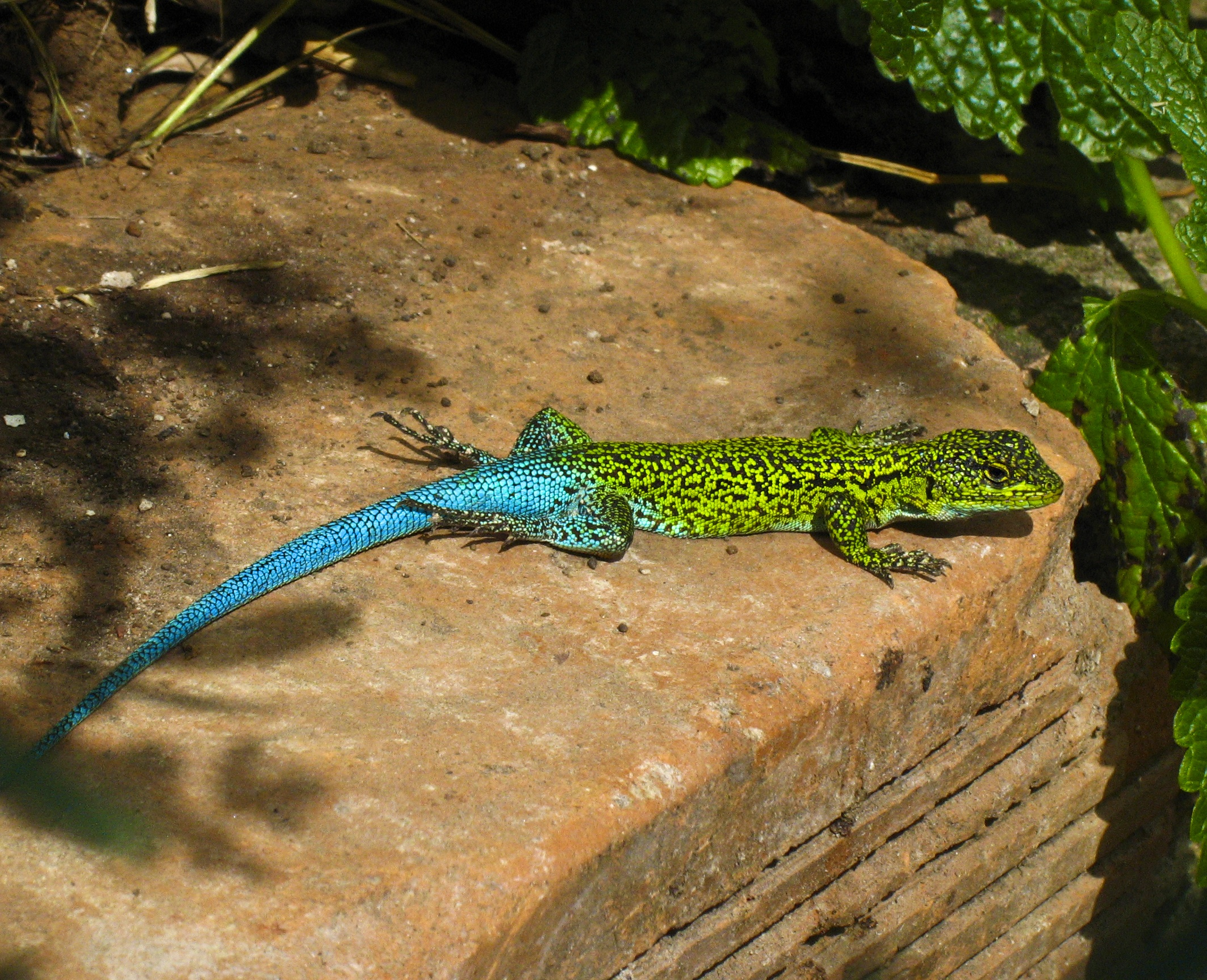
- Male Liolaemus tenuis

Scientific classification
- Kingdom: Animalia
- Phylum: Chordata
- Class: Reptilia
- Order: Squamata
- Suborder: Iguania
- Family: Liolaemidae; Frost & Etheridge, 1989

Synonyms
- Liolaeminae (but see text)

= Liolaemidae =

Family of lizards

Liolaemidae are a family of iguanian lizards. They were previously included in the family Iguanidae as subfamily Liolaeminae, which some more recent authors prefer to delimit in a more restricted way. This family is only found within South America with the widest range being in Argentina, Bolivia, Brazil, Chile, Peru, Uruguay, and Paraguay. A common name for this group is liolaemids. Liolaemidae are typically herbivores that have a diet high in fruit. Because of this special diet, Liolaemidae have a larger small intestine when compared to other similar omnivorous and insectivorous lizards. Liolaemidae also have evolved both herbivory and omnivory independently more times than any other lizard group

The genera placed here are:

- Ctenoblepharys Tschudi, 1845 – cabezona (one species)
- Liolaemus Wiegmann, 1834 – tree iguanas, snow swifts (over 280 species)
- Phymaturus Gravenhorst, 1838 (52 species)
