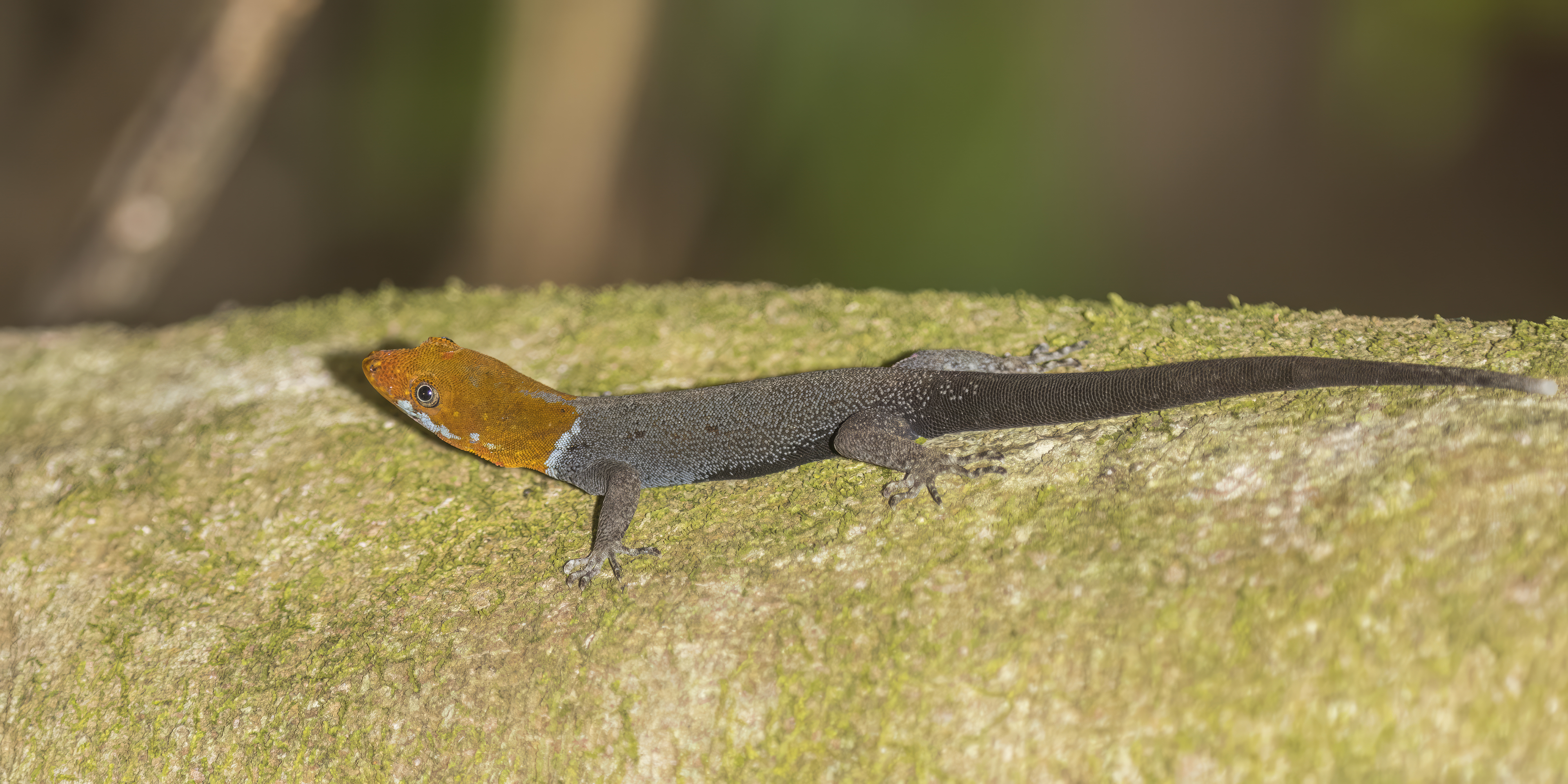
- Male G. a. fuscus, Panama
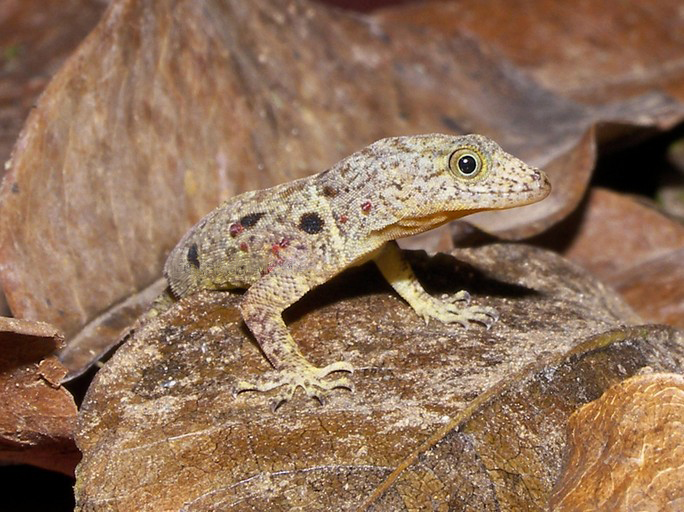
- Female, Colombia

Conservation status
- Least Concern (IUCN 3.1)

Scientific classification
- Kingdom: Animalia
- Phylum: Chordata
- Class: Reptilia
- Order: Squamata
- Suborder: Gekkota
- Family: Sphaerodactylidae
- Genus: Gonatodes
- Species: G. albogularis

Binomial name
- Gonatodes albogularis (Duméril and Bibron, 1836)

Synonyms
- Gymnodactylus albogularis Duméril and Bibron, 1836

= Yellow-headed gecko =

Species of reptile

Gonatodes albogularis, which has been called a number of vernacular names in English, is a smallish species of gecko found in warm parts of Central and South America, Cuba, Hispaniola and Jamaica. They prefer to live in tropical dry forest habitats. It is sexually dimorphic: the male is colourful, while the female is a more drab grey. The fingers do not have lamellar pads for climbing smooth surfaces like many other geckos but instead have normal claws like most lizards. At one time the species had a breeding population in southern Florida, especially Key West, but this population appears to have died out by the early 1990s. They are believed to be able to tell the difference between brightness and hues of conspecifics. Males are incredibly aggressive with territory defense against both other males and potential predators.

== Taxonomy ==
This gecko was first scientifically described by André Marie Constant Duméril and Gabriel Bibron in 1836 using a few specimens sent to Paris by Auguste Plée from Martinique. They also were able to examine numerous specimens collected in Cuba by the anarchist polymath Ramón de la Sagra, who had arrived in Paris from that island the previous year with many objects of natural history.

Gonatodes albogularis is the type species for the genus Gonatodes, because when Leopold Fitzinger defined the genus in 1843 he included three species in it: G. gravenhorstii, G. laevis and G. albogularis, because the first two names were nomina nuda, G. albogularis remains the only valid name for a type species by monotypy.

=== Subspecies ===
There are four subspecies as of 2020:

- Gonatodes albogularis albogularis (Duméril and Bibron, 1836)
- Gonatodes albogularis bodinii (Rivero Blanco, 1964) – First described as an independent species by Carlos Rivero-Blanco, first subsumed as a subspecies of this species by Beate Röll in 2009.
- Gonatodes albogularis fuscus (Hallowell, 1855) – First subsumed under this species by some taxonomists in 1962. It was considered an independent species by authorities such as the Reptile Database as of 2014 and Röll in 2009, but herpetologists from the United States such as Robert Powell and Robert W. Henderson have preferred to consider it to be a subspecies.
- Gonatodes albogularis notatus (Reinhardt and Lütken, 1862) – The form from the islands in the north of the Caribbean.

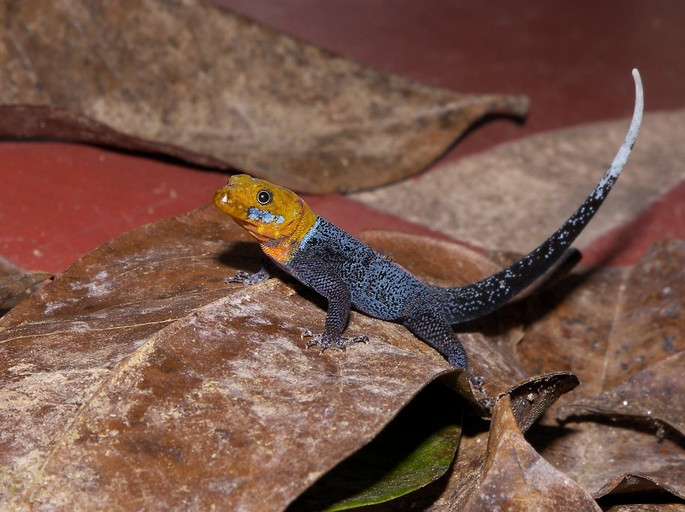
A male Gonatodes albogularis in Colombia.

=== Types ===
There are two syntypes for the nominate form which are kept at the Muséum national d'histoire naturelle in Paris. These were supposedly collected on Martinique, although the species does not appear to occur there.

=== Etymology ===
The etymology of the specific epithet albogularis is from the Latin language adjective albus, meaning '(dull) white', gula, meaning 'throat', and the Latin suffix -arius, which means 'pertaining to'; i.e. together giving 'white-throated', as this described their syntypes. This name was chosen by Duméril and Bibron for this taxon because the specimens they examined had the lower part of the head and the neck being "un blanc extrêmement pur", this colour also being found on the thighs, belly and underside of the tail, which contrasted sharply with "un noir profond" of the flanks and sides of the body -they describe the anterior of the creature as slate-coloured, and the breast whitish-grey. Clearly, dead animals discolour somewhat when preserved, or at least did so with the methods of two centuries ago!

== Common names ==
It has traditionally been called the white-throated clawed gecko or white-throated gecko in English, which is a calque of its scientific name. The name yellow-headed gecko is now commonly used for this species in the United States, but it originally applied to Gonatodes fuscus, now G. albogularis fuscus, which is the subspecies formerly found as an introduced species in Florida. In Venezuela it is known as mea-mea or machurito in Spanish. In La Guajira, where the language is the Arawakan Wayuunaiki or heavily influenced by it, this gecko is called curumachár or culumasár. The Mexican Comisión Nacional para el Conocimiento y Uso de la Biodiversidad officiated the vernacular name in Spanish of geco cabeza amarilla in 2001. A name in Colombia is güeco cabeciamarillo. Another Spanish name is limpiacasa. The Papiamento name for this gecko (and most other species) is pega-pega.

== Description ==
This gecko can grow up to between 69–90 mm (2.7–3.5 in). A maximal length of 100 mm (3.9 in) is also given. Like almost all Gonatodes species it is sexually dimorphic. Male geckos are colourful and have yellowish to orange-coloured heads and dark blue bodies, whereas the female geckos are more drab, having greyish white or light brown heads and bodies. The species are also identified by their round pupils and digits without extending lamellae. It has no eyelids. The young geckos are coloured like the females.

Males have a larger snout-vent length, distance from tip of head to the base of the tail. Both males and females reach sexual maturity at the same size with the ability to reproduce any time during the year. They reach this size around the age of 6 months. Similar to other geckos, G. albogularis does not accumulate fat in their abdomens. This suggests that reproductive abilities are not influenced by the amount of fat a lizard has. Reproductive abilities are driven by other factors. G. albogularis is typically found in dry habitats but have also been observed in moist habitats. Their main diet consists of insects and spiders. G. albogularis is also a very territorial lizard. They defend their territories by primarily waving their tails and other behaviors.

=== Similar species ===
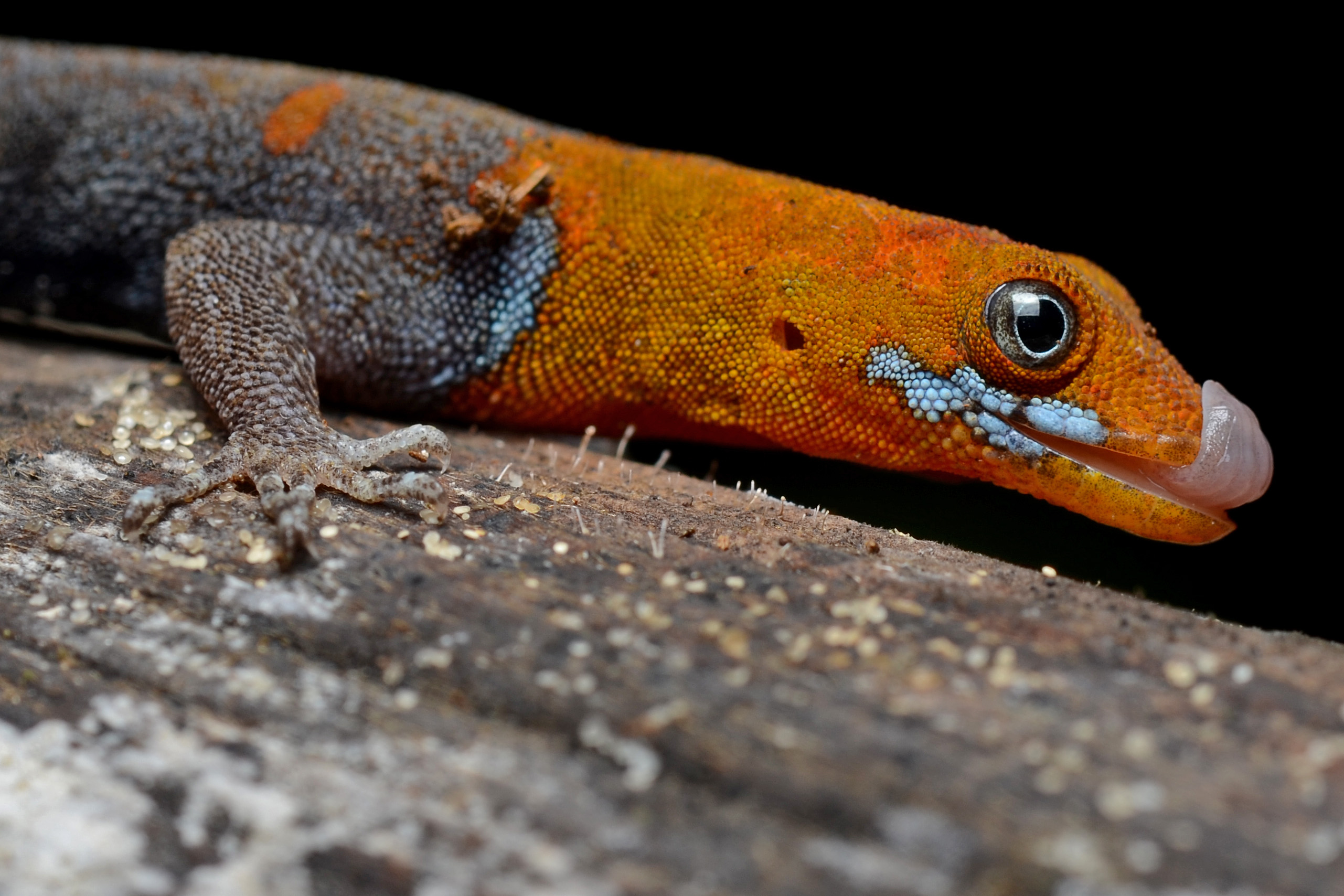
Male Gonatodes albogularis fuscus photographed near Puerto Viejo de Sarapiquí, Costa Rica.

In the Lesser Antilles it can be distinguished from G. antillensis by having a much rougher skin texture. The males have a darker-coloured body, and have a blue patch near the ear. The pupil is always round.

== Distribution ==
- Gonatodes albogularis albogularis

The nominate subspecies is known from the Lesser Antilles, northern Colombia (Valle del Cauca, Chocó, La Guajira), Venezuela (Barinas and elsewhere). The first specimens were supposedly collected on Martinique in the early 19th century, but the species has never been recovered from that island again. There are some records from Trinidad and Tobago, but as of 2018 it is believed that these are in error and based on misidentifications with G. vittatus, which is an extremely common species in that country. The syntypes of the nominate form have also been said to have been collected on Cuba, but the nominate form is also thought to be introduced to the island.

In the Lesser Antilles it is found on Aruba and Curaçao. Hummelinck proposed that this distribution is not natural and that the species is introduced on these islands. On Curaçao it is particularly common in the central portion of the island around the old plantations of Daniël and Siberië.

The populations in Venezuela are found in the ecoregions of: the islands of the coast of the mainland, the coastal strip of the mainland, the lowlands around Lake Maracaibo, the Cordillera de Mérida, the Serranía del Perijá, the hills of Lara and Falcón and the Orinoco Delta. It is absent from the central Llanos (plains), the Amazon rainforest in the south, and the Guyana Shield in the east, which together correspond to the vast majority of the territory of the country.

In the United States, G. albogularis is most prominent in Florida. With a tropical-like climate, non-native species are able to survive, and this lizard is no exception. It is most likely that the yellow-headed gecko migrated from the Key West into other parts of Florida. The first documented sighting was reported in 1934, but research suggests that they have been in Florida since 1929.

- Gonatodes albogularis bodinii

This taxon was first collected on Monje Grande del Sur, Venezuela, in the early 1960s. It appears to be endemic to the Los Monjes Archipelago and found on both Monje Grande del Sur and Monje Grande del Norte.

- Gonatodes albogularis fuscus

G. albogularis fuscus was first collected in Nicaragua, likely at the port town of El Rama, although as of 1988 the holotype is missing. It is also distributed in Panama, Costa Rica, El Salvador, and Cuba, including Cayo Santa María, and western Colombia.

This taxon was first collected around Miami, Florida, in 1934, and is thought to have spread from the Florida Keys, although the first specimen was only collected there in 1939. It may have been transported from the Keys to other areas in southern Florida in the early 20th century, but it seems to have naturally died out throughout the Florida mainland or never truly established breeding populations there. The last specimen was collected in Key West in 1989, and the last sighting of the species was in Key West in 1995. Monitoring for the creature by gecko specialist herpetologists from 1995 to 2005 throughout southern Florida failed to provide any evidence that the species remained extant in the region.

- Gonatodes albogularis notatus

This taxon was probably first collected in the city of Aquin, Haiti, although in 1988 Schartz and Henderson gave a long list of different type localities throughout Haiti for the single specimen. It is found on the islands of Jamaica, Grand Cayman Island, Îlet à Cabrit (part of the Guadeloupe archipelago of France) and Hispaniola. It has been recorded at altitudes from sea level to 3,000 feet (910 m).

On Hispaniola it is primarily found in coastal areas and is restricted to the west of Haiti, it had not been recorded from eastern Haiti or anywhere in the Dominican Republic as of 1980. It is widespread on the Tiburon Peninsula of Haiti and occurring on the Plaine du Cul-de-Sac and the northern shore of the Gulf of Gonâve northwards to the city of Gonaïves, including the Ile de la Gonâve.

- Unknown

The species also occur in Mexico (Chiapas, Veracruz), Guatemala and Honduras, but it is unclear to which subspecies these populations belong. It has been stated to be found in Belize, but it has never actually been recorded in that country. The population on Cuba has also been said to represent the nominate subspecies which is generally from northern South America, as well as fuscus from southern Central America, although notatus is found on the surrounding Caribbean islands, and the species has also been said to be introduced to the nation.

== Reproduction and parental care ==
Gonatodes albogularis prefers to lay their eggs in communal sites to maximize the hatching success and extra protection from predators. Gonatodes albogularis can have multiple offspring in a year and does not have a preferential breeding season.

=== Site selection for egg laying ===
Females primarily nest in tree trunks laying single eggs. However, it has been observed for tree bases to be communal egg-laying spots in Costa Rica and Panama. These locations are also where most of these lizards can be found along with tree branches, under rocks, debris, and in soil litter. Soil litter provides the best conditions for communal egg-laying. These conditions often lead to higher reproductive success of females along with greater success of hatchlings. A high density of eggs in one area can provide moisture control, so the eggs will not dry out as quickly. This is especially valuable during the dry season when eggs are more susceptible to desiccation. Soil litter can also act as protection. The eggs are less visible when they are hidden in the litter, so they are less prone to predators.

=== Brood size ===
G. albogularis females only carry one egg at a time with the ability of having more than one offspring in a year. Although reproduction can happen anytime during the year, it happens significantly less from December–May which is during the dry season. They put all of their reproductive efforts towards ensuring that one offspring survives. [8] The egg will hatch in 2–4 months after it has been laid.

== Physiology ==
Yellow-headed gecko are able to differentiate between coloration and brightness with direct consequences to mating partner selections.

=== Vision ===
It is believed that the yellow-headed gecko is able to tell the difference in brightness and hues of conspecifics. The lens of the lizard is yellow. With the yellow lens, short wavelengths (less than 450 nm) are blocked, so there will not be as much damage to the eye. The lens also acts in limiting color distortion. Colors on these lizards can be highly reflective which influences their desirability for mating along with other behaviors. Longer wavelengths of light are consistent with duller colors. Females prefer males with brighter colors, so the ability to detect different brightness has direct effects on mate selection. Although this can be useful for choosing a mate, it can only be used when the lizards are in close proximity to another.

== Mating ==
Yellow-headed geckos exhibit aggressive behaviors to defend territory and as anti-predator mechanisms. They also display different coloration to maximize mating success.

=== Male intraspecific interactions ===
Males have many aggressive behaviors that help them defend their territories from not only other males but also predators. Some of these behaviors include throat depressions, push-ups, tail displays, whole body waving, and bites. Males with high success in defending their territories exhibited more of these aggressive behaviors, and the behaviors lasted much, much longer. This gecko initially starts with more subtle movements by only moving one part of their body like throat depressions. If he feels more threatened, he will exhibit stronger, more aggressive behaviors such as push-ups or whole-body waving. These aggressive behaviors usually crest mid-day with high variability any other time of day. One hypothesis suggests that aggressive behaviors peak mid-day, because their predators are not as active. G. albogularis has a chance to increase their fitness by defending their habitat and searching for mates.

Similar to other species, a high body mass is often associated with more aggressive behaviors. Larger body mass is also associated with greater reproductive success because these males are more dominant. Testosterone is not a contributor to aggression level in this gecko. More aggressive males not only had a larger body mass but also smaller, lighter testicles. Increased hormones levels of adrenaline and noradrenaline are more likely to be associated with higher aggression levels.

=== Mate searching behavior ===
As with many species, natural selection and sexual selection are working against one another in G. albogularis. For mating purposes, females typically prefer males who have brighter colors. However, some brighter colors make the males more prone to predation. Being inconspicuous gives males a greater chance of survival but significantly decreases the chance of finding a mate. Yellower males are an exception to this. Compared to red males, yellow males are more likely to outcompete other males and have a decreased risk of predation. The coloration is also a sign of dominance, so they have an advantage in both sexual and natural selection. In one experiment, the colors of the male lizards were masked using a light. When the colors were masked, females seemed to prefer blue males. This suggests that females prefer blue males, but the yellow males are much more dominant, so they are able to mate with females at a higher rate than their counterparts.

== Predators ==
One predator of the yellow-headed gecko is the Brown Vinesnake, or Oxybelis aeneus. There have only been reports of the snake killing the lizard, and the act of consumption has not been observed. The Brown Vinesnake ambushes its prey with its enlarged rear fangs and moderate venom. Some of their other predators are larger lizards, birds, and mammals.

=== Parasites ===
G. albogularis is prone to parasitism by many species of Nematoda. Some of the species include Cosmocerca parva, Parapharyngodon scleratus, Physaloptera retusa, Skrjabinelazia galliardi, Spauligodon bonairensis, and Spauligodon oxkutzcabiensis. These parasites are classified as generalist helminths and typically found in the digestive tract (stomach and small and large intestines). The most prevalent ones are Skrjabinelazia galliardi and Spauligodon oxkutzcabiensis with S. oxkutzcabiensis having the most detrimental effects to the health of the lizard.

=== Escape behavior ===
To decrease the risk of predation, the yellow-headed gecko will lose its tail if a predator latches onto it. The escape behavior theory says that the lizard will lose its tail only when the risk of predation outweighs the cost of fleeing. Although this action provides defense from the initial attack, losing the tail does decrease the chance of survival if there is a subsequent attack. After an individual loses its tail, they will exhibit more escape behavior. They will not allow predators to get as close to them, because they do not have that extra layer of protection. As the tail grows back, the escape behavior tends to decrease, because the lizard is not as susceptible to predation, because they have more protection. The lizards will also stay closer to their shelter once they lose their tail to limit flight initiation distance. Flight initiation distance describes "the distance between a prey and an approaching predator when the prey starts to flee." In both male and female yellow-headed geckos, flight initiation distance and distance to nearest refuge were positively correlated. As flight initiation time increased so did distance to the nearest refuge.

Temperature can also play a role in whether or not this lizard exhibits escape behavior. High temperatures are more likely to be associated with a lesser distance between the lizard and its predator. In high temperatures, the lizard has higher activity levels. By waiting for the predator to get as close as possible, energy expenditures will be limited thus increasing fitness.

Escape behaviors are also indicative of the female Yellow-headed gecko's gravidity. This phenomenon is often referred to as behavioral compensation, gravid females will change their behaviors in flight initiation distance and eloped distance to balance the costs and benefits of avoiding predators. Gravid females are heavier and move slower but have a higher flight initiation distance, distance fled and lower distance to refuge.

== Ecology ==
Yellow-headed geckos feed on insects. They are mainly diurnal, although they avoid direct sunlight. A study in Panama found that they may lay eggs on a seasonal basis, laying more eggs during the rainy season. Only one egg is laid at a time.

=== Habitat ===
The species seems to prefer tropical dry forest, forest edges and anthropogenic habitats. In Haiti it is primarily found along the coast as an "edificarian" -this means it prefers human buildings as habitat. They can sometimes be found indoors. As a result, they are likely to enter areas with human activity and interact with humans.

== Relationship to humans ==
Up until the 1950s the pega-pega was much feared in the Antilles, where the superstition formerly existed that once it climbed on you it would latch itself so tightly it would be almost impossible to remove, with the best remedies being burning it off with a lit cigarette, a hot clothes iron or by pouring boiling water over it. Some also claimed it was poisonous. This superstition had largely faded among the younger generation by the turn of the century.

== See also ==
- Dwarf yellow-headed gecko
- Yellow-headed day gecko
