= Gonatodes machelae =

Scientific classification
- Kingdom: Animalia
- Phylum: Chordata
- Class: Reptilia
- Order: Squamata
- Suborder: Gekkota
- Family: Sphaerodactylidae
- Genus: Gonatodes
- Species: G. machelae

Binomial name
- Gonatodes machelae Rivero-Blanco & Schargel, 2020

Species of lizard

Gonatodes machelae is a species of lizard in the family Sphaerodactylidae. The species is endemic to Margarita Island in Venezuela.
