= Peters's gecko =

Peters' gecko

Conservation status
- Least Concern (IUCN 3.1)

Scientific classification
- Kingdom: Animalia
- Phylum: Chordata
- Class: Reptilia
- Order: Squamata
- Suborder: Gekkota
- Family: Sphaerodactylidae
- Genus: Gonatodes
- Species: G. petersi

Binomial name
- Gonatodes petersi Donoso-Barros, 1967

Species of lizard

Peters' gecko (Gonatodes petersi) is a species of lizard in the family Sphaerodactylidae. The species is endemic to Venezuela.

== Etymology ==
The specific name, petersi, is in honor of American herpetologist James A. Peters.

== Geographic range ==
Gonatodes petersi is found on the eastern slopes of the Sierra de Perijá in Zulia state, Venezuela.

== Habitat ==
The natural habitat of Gonatodes petersi is forest at altitudes of 230–1,130 m (750–3,710 ft).

== Behavior ==
Gonatodes petersi is mainly diurnal.

== Reproduction ==
Gonatodes petersi is oviparous.
