= Gonatodes rayito =

Scientific classification
- Kingdom: Animalia
- Phylum: Chordata
- Class: Reptilia
- Order: Squamata
- Suborder: Gekkota
- Family: Sphaerodactylidae
- Genus: Gonatodes
- Species: G. rayito

Binomial name
- Gonatodes rayito Schargel, Rivas, Garcia-Perez, Rivero-Blanco, Chippindale, & Fujita, 2017

Species of lizard

Gonatodes rayito is a species of lizard in the Sphaerodactylidae family found in Venezuela.
