= Gonatodes ligiae =

Conservation status
- Data Deficient (IUCN 3.1)

Scientific classification
- Kingdom: Animalia
- Phylum: Chordata
- Order: Squamata
- Suborder: Gekkota
- Family: Sphaerodactylidae
- Genus: Gonatodes
- Species: G. ligiae

Binomial name
- Gonatodes ligiae Donoso-Barros, 1967

Species of lizard

Gonatodes ligiae is a species of lizard in the Sphaerodactylidae family found in Venezuela.
