= Gonatodes astralis =

Conservation status
- Vulnerable (IUCN 3.1)

Scientific classification
- Kingdom: Animalia
- Phylum: Chordata
- Class: Reptilia
- Order: Squamata
- Suborder: Gekkota
- Family: Sphaerodactylidae
- Genus: Gonatodes
- Species: G. astralis

Binomial name
- Gonatodes astralis Schargel, Rivas, Makowsky, Señaris, Natera, Barros, Molina, & Barrio-Amorós, 2010

Species of lizard

Gonatodes astralis is a species of lizard in the Sphaerodactylidae family found in Venezuela.
