= Gonatodes naufragus =

Conservation status
- Near Threatened (IUCN 3.1)

Scientific classification
- Kingdom: Animalia
- Phylum: Chordata
- Class: Reptilia
- Order: Squamata
- Suborder: Gekkota
- Family: Sphaerodactylidae
- Genus: Gonatodes
- Species: G. naufragus

Binomial name
- Gonatodes naufragus Rivas, Ugueto, Schargel, Barros, Velozo, & Sánchez, 2013

Species of lizard

Gonatodes naufragus is a species of lizard in the Sphaerodactylidae family found in Venezuela.
