= Estados Sucre gecko =

Conservation status
- Endangered (IUCN 3.1)

Scientific classification
- Kingdom: Animalia
- Phylum: Chordata
- Order: Squamata
- Suborder: Gekkota
- Family: Sphaerodactylidae
- Genus: Gonatodes
- Species: G. seigliei

Binomial name
- Gonatodes seigliei Donoso-Barros, 1966

Species of lizard

The Estado's Sucre gecko (Gonatodes seigliei) is a species of lizard in the family Sphaerodactylidae. The species is endemic to Venezuela.

== Etymology ==
The specific name, seigliei, is in honor of Cuban-Venezuelan micropaleontologist George Alfredo Seiglie (1926–1988).

== Geographic range ==
G. seigliei is found in the Venezuelan states of Monagas and Sucre.

== Habitat ==
The preferred natural habitat of G. seigliei is forest, at altitudes of 800–1,300 m (2,600–4,300 ft).

== Description ==
G. seigliei is a small gecko, characterized by granular rostral and labial scales, black vermiculations on the yellowish head and the dorsum, and the presence of a pair of small ocelli (eye spots) located very anteriorly, above the shoulders.

== Reproduction ==
G. seigliei is oviparous.
