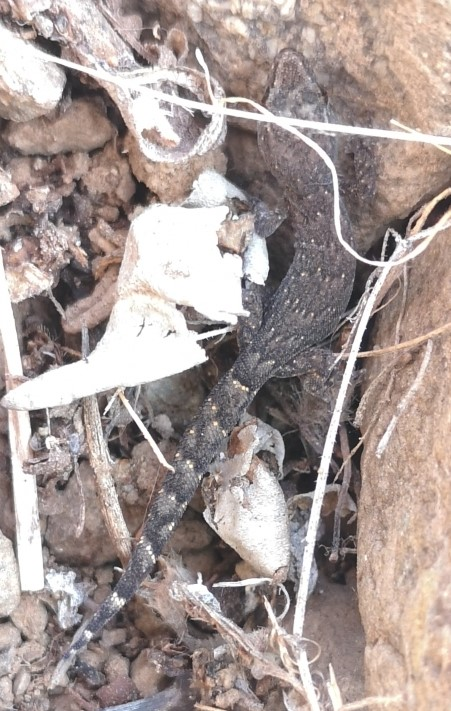
- Garthia gaudichaudii

Scientific classification
- Kingdom: Animalia
- Phylum: Chordata
- Class: Reptilia
- Order: Squamata
- Suborder: Gekkota
- Family: Phyllodactylidae
- Genus: Garthia; Donoso-Barros & Vanzolini, 1965

= Garthia =

Genus of lizards

Garthia is a genus of lizards, commonly known as marked geckos, in the family Phyllodactylidae. The genus is endemic to Chile.

== Etymology ==
The generic name, Garthia, is in honor of British herpetologist Garth Underwood.

== Species ==
The following two species are recognized.

- Garthia gaudichaudii (A.M.C. Duméril & Bibron, 1836) – Chilean marked gecko
  - Garthia gaudichaudii dorbignii (A.M.C. Duméril & Bibron, 1836)
  - Garthia gaudichaudii gaudichaudii (A.M.C. Duméril & Bibron, 1836)
  - Garthia gaudichaudii klugei Donoso-Barros, 1970
- Garthia penai Donoso-Barros, 1966 – Coquimbo marked gecko

Nota bene: A binomial authority in parentheses indicates that the species was originally described in a genus other than Garthia.
