= Roze's gecko =

Conservation status
- Least Concern (IUCN 3.1)

Scientific classification
- Kingdom: Animalia
- Phylum: Chordata
- Class: Reptilia
- Order: Squamata
- Suborder: Gekkota
- Family: Sphaerodactylidae
- Genus: Gonatodes
- Species: G. rozei

Binomial name
- Gonatodes rozei Rivero-Blanco & Schargel, 2012

Species of lizard

Roze's gecko (Gonatodes rozei), also known commonly as limpiacasa (meaning "house cleaner" in Spanish), is a species of lizard in the family Sphaerodactylidae. The species is endemic to Venezuela.

== Etymology ==
The specific name, rozei, is in honor of Latvian-American herpetologist Janis Roze.

== Geographic range ==
G. rozei is found in northern Venezuela, in the Venezuelan states of Anzoátegui, Guárico, Miranda, and Vargas.

== Habitat ==
The preferred natural habitat of G. rozei is forest, at altitudes of 30–1,000 m (98–3,281 ft).

== Description ==
A large species for its genus, G. rozei may attain a snout-to-vent length (SVL) of 5.9 cm (2.3 in).
