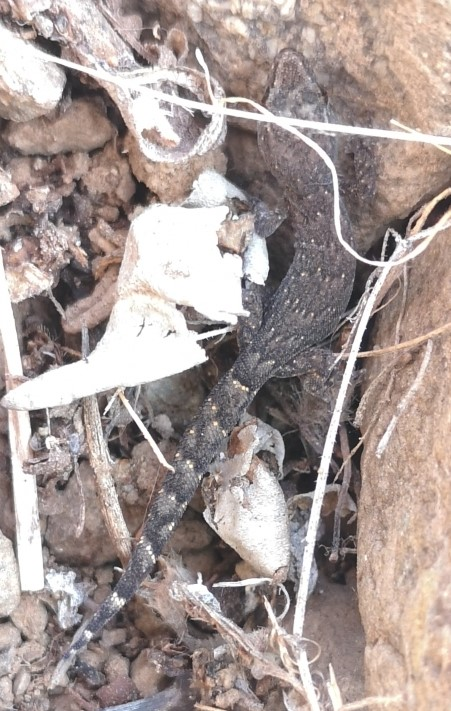

Conservation status
- Least Concern (IUCN 3.1)

Scientific classification
- Kingdom: Animalia
- Phylum: Chordata
- Class: Reptilia
- Order: Squamata
- Suborder: Gekkota
- Family: Phyllodactylidae
- Genus: Garthia
- Species: G. gaudichaudii

Binomial name
- Garthia gaudichaudii (A.M.C. Duméril & Bibron, 1836)

Synonyms
- Gymnodactylus gaudichaudii A.M.C. Duméril & Bibron, 1836; Saurodactylus gaudichaudii — Fitzinger, 1843; Homonota guidichaudi [sic] — Gray, 1845 (ex errore); Gonatodes gaudichaudii — Boulenger, 1885; Homonota gaudichaudii — Kluge, 1964; Garthia gaudichaudii — Donoso-Barros & Vanzolini, 1965

= Chilean marked gecko =

Species of lizard

The Chilean marked gecko (Garthia gaudichaudii) is a species of lizard in the family Phyllodactylidae. The species is endemic to Chile, in the Chilean matorral ecoregion (Hogan & World Wildlife Fund 2013). There are three recognized subspecies.

== Taxonomy ==
This organism was first described by André Marie Constant Duméril and Gabriel Bibron in the year 1836 as a new species of lizard, Gymnodactylus gaudichaudii. Over the years the species has been assigned to several different genera by various authorities. Most recently, it has been placed in the genus Garthia.

== Etymology ==
The specific name, gaudichaudii, is in honor of French botanist Charles Gaudichaud-Beaupré. The subspecific name, klugei, is in honor of American herpetologist Arnold G. Kluge.

== Geographic range ==
G. gaudichaudii is found in the Chilean regions of Antofagasta, Atacama, Coquimbo, and Valparaíso.

== Habitat ==
The preferred natural habitats of G. gaudichaudii are desert and shrubland, at altitudes from sea level to 1,100 m (3,600 ft).

== Behavior ==
G. gaudichaudii is terrestrial, saxicolous, and nocturnal.

== Reproduction ==
G. gaudichaudii is oviparous.

== Subspecies ==
Three subspecies are recognized as being valid, including the nominotypical subspecies.

- Garthia gaudichaudii dorbignii (A.M.C. Duméril & Bibron, 1836)
- Garthia gaudichaudii gaudichaudii (A.M.C. Duméril & Bibron, 1836)
- Garthia gaudichaudii klugei Donoso-Barros, 1970

Nota bene: A trinomial authority in parentheses indicates that the subspecies was originally described in a genus other than Garthia.
