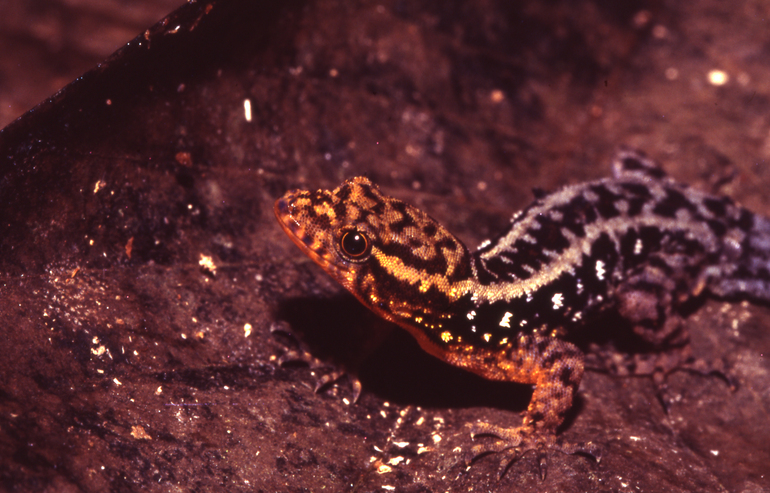

Conservation status
- Least Concern (IUCN 3.1)

Scientific classification
- Kingdom: Animalia
- Phylum: Chordata
- Class: Reptilia
- Order: Squamata
- Suborder: Gekkota
- Family: Sphaerodactylidae
- Genus: Gonatodes
- Species: G. hasemani

Binomial name
- Gonatodes hasemani Griffin, 1917

Synonyms
- Gonatodes hasemani Griffin, 1917; Gonatodes spinulosus Amaral, 1933; Gonatodes hasemanni [sic] Vanzolini, 1953 (ex errore); Gonatodes hasemani — Kluge, 1993

= Haseman's gecko =

Species of lizard

Haseman's gecko (Gonatodes hasemani) is a species of lizard in the family Sphaerodactylidae. The species is indigenous to northern South America.

== Etymology ==
The specific name, hasemani, is in honor of American ichthyologist John Diederich Haseman, who collected specimens in South America (1907–1910) for Carnegie Museum (now Carnegie Museum of Natural History).

== Geographic range ==
G. hasemani is native to northern Bolivia (Pando, Beni), northern Brazil (Acre, Amazonas, Mato Grosso, Pará, Rondônia), southeastern Colombia (Vaupés), and eastern Peru.

== Habitat ==
The preferred natural habitat of G. hasemani is forest.

== Description ==
G. hasemani may attain a snout-to-vent length (SVL) of 3 cm (1.2 in).

== Reproduction ==
G. hasemani is oviparous.

== Parasites ==
G. hasemani is a host for parasitic worms of the genera Mesocestoides and Skrjabinelazia.
