= Gonatodes infernalis =

Conservation status
- Critically Endangered (IUCN 3.1)

Scientific classification
- Kingdom: Animalia
- Phylum: Chordata
- Class: Reptilia
- Order: Squamata
- Suborder: Gekkota
- Family: Sphaerodactylidae
- Genus: Gonatodes
- Species: G. infernalis

Binomial name
- Gonatodes infernalis Rivas & Schargel, 2008

Species of lizard

Gonatodes infernalis is a species of lizard in the Sphaerodactylidae family found in Venezuela.
