= Gonatodes purpurogularis =

Conservation status
- Endangered (IUCN 3.1)

Scientific classification
- Kingdom: Animalia
- Phylum: Chordata
- Class: Reptilia
- Order: Squamata
- Suborder: Gekkota
- Family: Sphaerodactylidae
- Genus: Gonatodes
- Species: G. purpurogularis

Binomial name
- Gonatodes purpurogularis Esqueda, 2004

Species of lizard

Gonatodes purpurogularis is a species of lizard in the Sphaerodactylidae family found in Venezuela.
