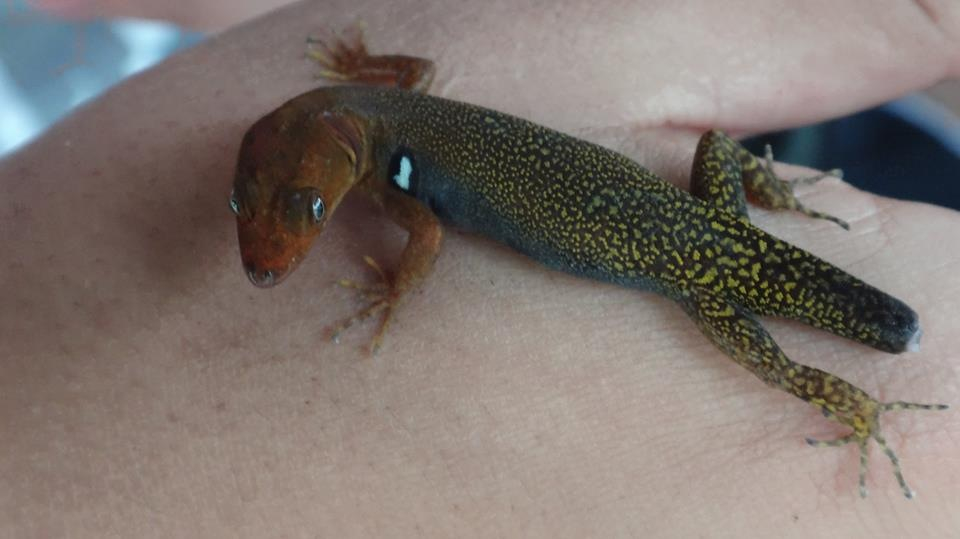

Conservation status
- Least Concern (IUCN 3.1)

Scientific classification
- Kingdom: Animalia
- Phylum: Chordata
- Class: Reptilia
- Order: Squamata
- Suborder: Gekkota
- Family: Sphaerodactylidae
- Genus: Gonatodes
- Species: G. riveroi

Binomial name
- Gonatodes riveroi Sturaro & Ávila-Pires, 2011

= Gonatodes riveroi =

Species of lizard

Gonatodes riveroi is a species of lizard in the family Sphaerodactylidae. The species is endemic to Colombia.

== Etymology ==
The specific name, riveroi, is in honor of Venezuelan herpetologist Carlos Rivero-Blanco.

== Geographic range ==
G. riveroi is found in central Colombia in Boyacá Department, Cundinamarca Department, and Meta Department.

== Habitat ==
The preferred natural habitat of G. riveroi is forest, at altitudes of 230–1,200 m (750–3,940 ft).

== Description ==
G. riveroi is moderately large for its genus. The maximum recorded snout-to-vent length (SVL) is 4.8 cm (1.9 in).

== Behavior ==
G. riveroi is diurnal.
