= Perijá lichen gecko =

Conservation status
- Data Deficient (IUCN 3.1)

Scientific classification
- Kingdom: Animalia
- Phylum: Chordata
- Class: Reptilia
- Order: Squamata
- Suborder: Gekkota
- Family: Sphaerodactylidae
- Genus: Gonatodes
- Species: G. lichenosus

Binomial name
- Gonatodes lichenosus Rojas-Runjaic, Infante-Rivero, Cabello, & Velozo, 2010

Species of lizard

The Perijá lichen gecko (Gonatodes lichenosus) is a species of lizard in the Sphaerodactylidae family native to the Serranía del Perijá of eastern Venezuela.
