= Gonatodes castanae =

Scientific classification
- Domain: Eukaryota
- Kingdom: Animalia
- Phylum: Chordata
- Class: Reptilia
- Order: Squamata
- Infraorder: Gekkota
- Family: Sphaerodactylidae
- Genus: Gonatodes
- Species: G. castanae

Binomial name
- Gonatodes castanae Carvajal-Cogollo, Eguis-Avendano, & Meza-Joya, 2020

Species of lizard

Gonatodes castanae, Castaño's gecko, is a species of lizard in the Sphaerodactylidae family found in Colombia.
