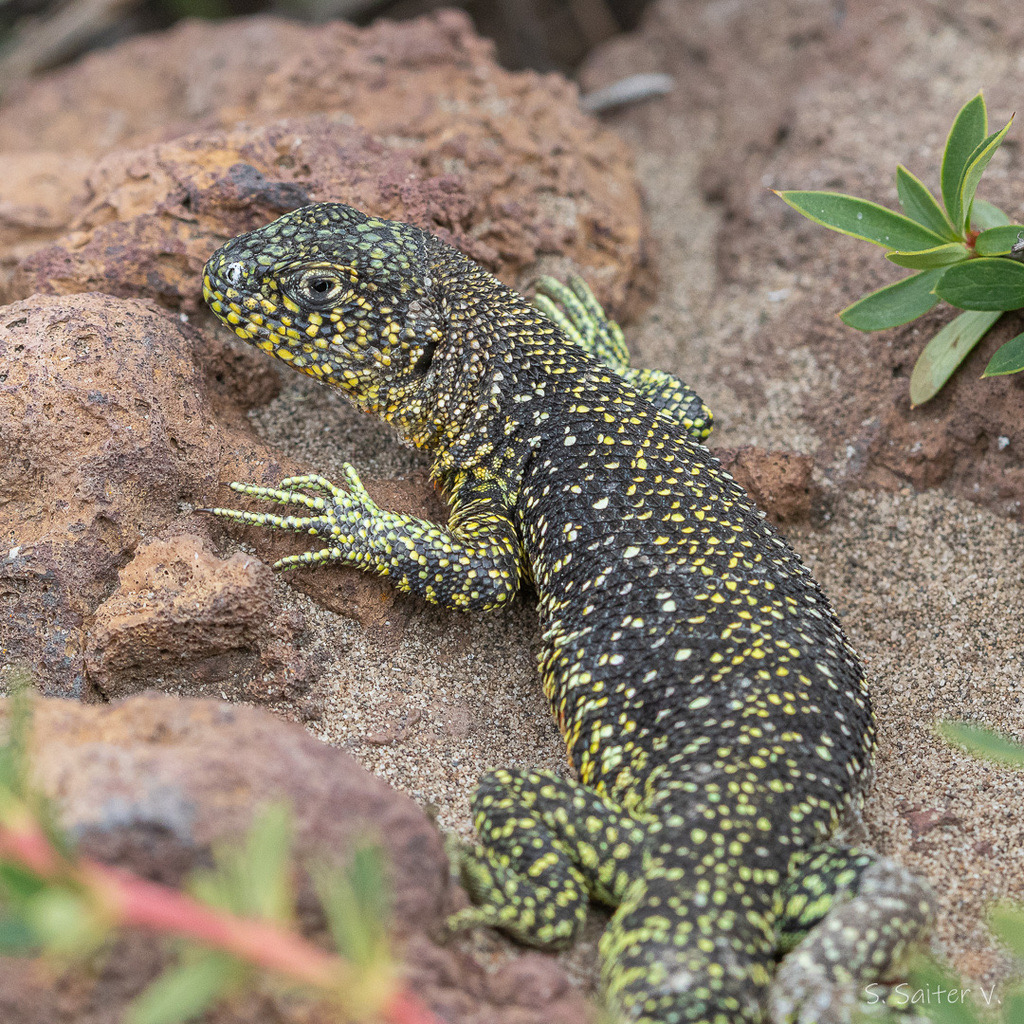
- L. sarmientoi at Pali-Aike National Park, Chile (Sebastián Saiter V.)

Conservation status
- Least Concern (IUCN 3.1)

Scientific classification
- Kingdom: Animalia
- Phylum: Chordata
- Class: Reptilia
- Order: Squamata
- Suborder: Iguania
- Family: Liolaemidae
- Genus: Liolaemus
- Species: L. sarmientoi

Binomial name
- Liolaemus sarmientoi Donoso-Barros, 1973
- Geographic range of L. sarmientoi

Synonyms
- Liolaemus archeforus sarmientoi Donoso-Barros; Liolaemus sarmientoi Cei & Scolaro

= Liolaemus sarmientoi =

Species of lizard

Liolaemus sarmientoi is a species of lizard in the family Liolaemidae. It is considered a medium-sized example of the family, with an average snout–vent length of 76 to 77 mm, with males usually larger than females.

== Etymology ==
The lizard was first described by Chilean herpetologist Roberto Donoso-Barros in 1973. The species was initially categorized as a subspecies of Liolaemus archeforus, another Patagonian species described by Donoso-Barros and Cei in 1971, but was elevated to a distinct species after further study by Cei and Scolaro in 1996.

The specific name sarmientoi comes from the Spanish explorer Pedro Sarmiento de Gamboa, known for his early transit through the Strait of Magellan, which runs near the habitat of the species' population.

== Geographic range and habitat ==
L. sarmientoi is considered one of the southernmost lizard species in the world, being endemic to the extreme southern regions of Chile and Argentina, known as Patagonia. The species is saxicolous, or an inhabitant of rocky, volcanic habitats, found along the arid, windswept steppe.

There is no estimate of the total population of the species on record.

== Behavior ==
L. sarmientoi, like most lizard species, is ectothermic. Because of the harsh climate conditions of the region in which L. sarmientoi lives, it is able to generate heat both by conductive means, i.e. via contact with warm surfaces, and heliothermic means, directly from the sun. Through these means, they achieve a body temperature of around 26 °C. Their behavior is typically restricted by this climate, the species is most active during the spring and summer months, corresponding to between late November and February in the southern hemisphere, and lives in a state of dormancy, or brumation, from autumn through the start of the next spring.

L. sarmientoi is omnivorous.

=== Reproduction ===
L. sarmientoi is viviparous. The reproductive cycle of the species is annual and takes place during the spring and summer, however, depending on climatic conditions, females of the species can adjust the reproductive cycle based on energy and food restrictions. Birth typically occurs in mid-summer, and litter sizes are typically between 3 and 5.
