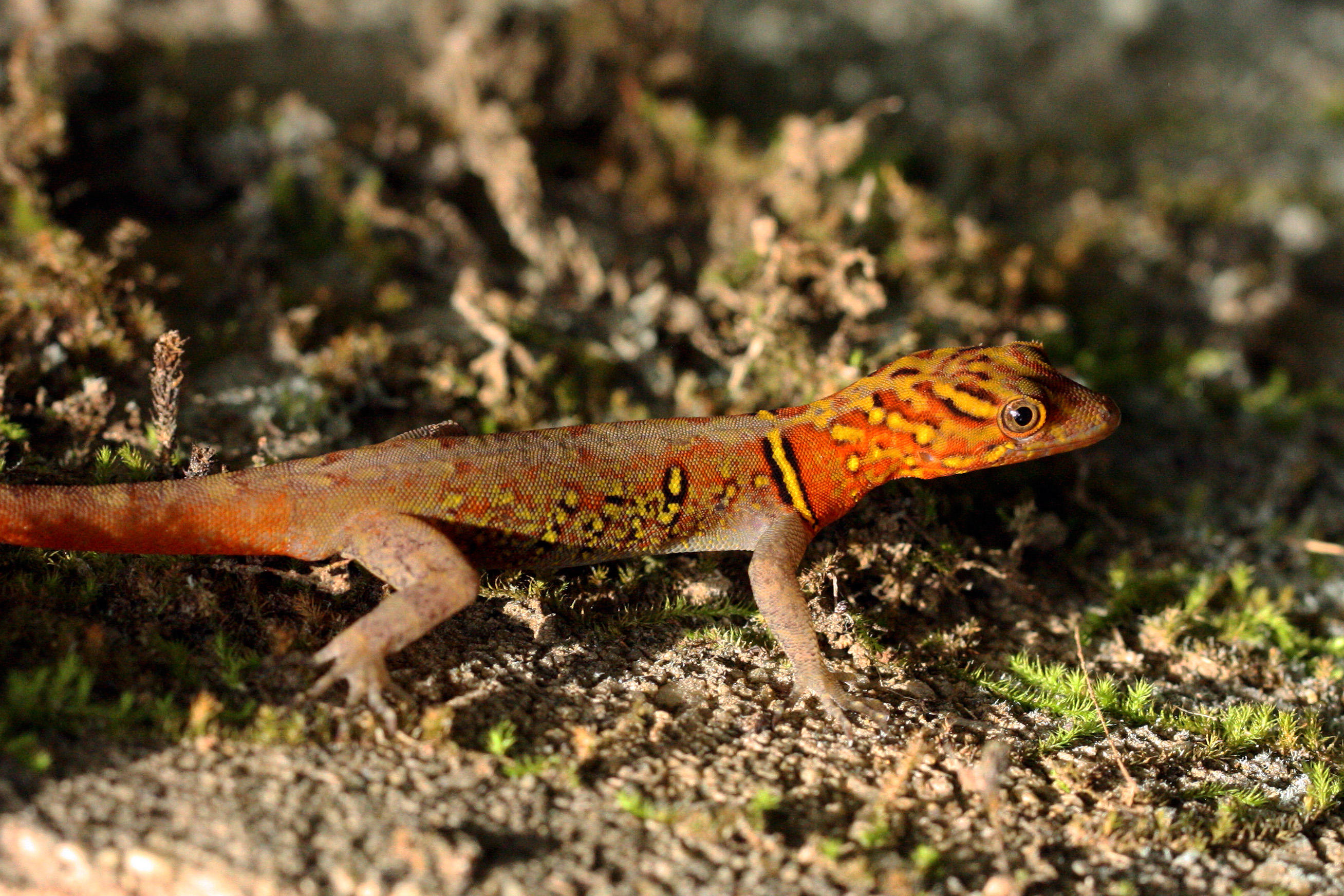
- Male brilliant South American gecko (Gonatodes ceciliae), Trinidad

Scientific classification
- Kingdom: Animalia
- Phylum: Chordata
- Class: Reptilia
- Order: Squamata
- Suborder: Gekkota
- Family: Sphaerodactylidae
- Genus: Gonatodes; Fitzinger, 1843

Species
- 34, see text

= Gonatodes =

Genus of dwarf geckos

Gonatodes is a genus of New World dwarf geckos of the family Sphaerodactylidae.

== Description ==
The majority of the species in the genus Gonatodes are diurnally active, scansorial, and sexually dichromatic, with adult body size (snout–vent length) ranging from 28 to 65 mm (1.1 to 2.6 in) for known species.

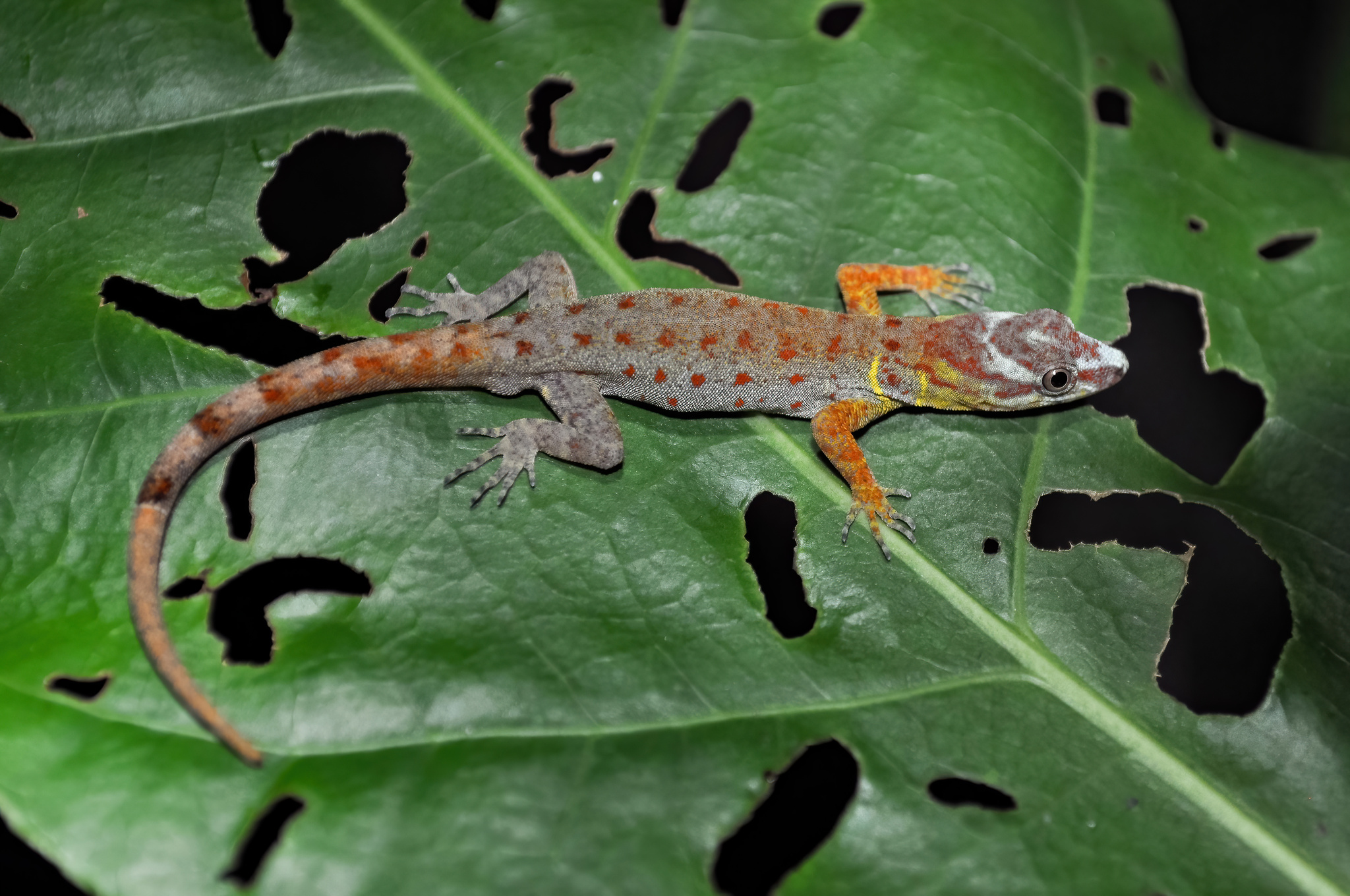
Gonatodes humeralis

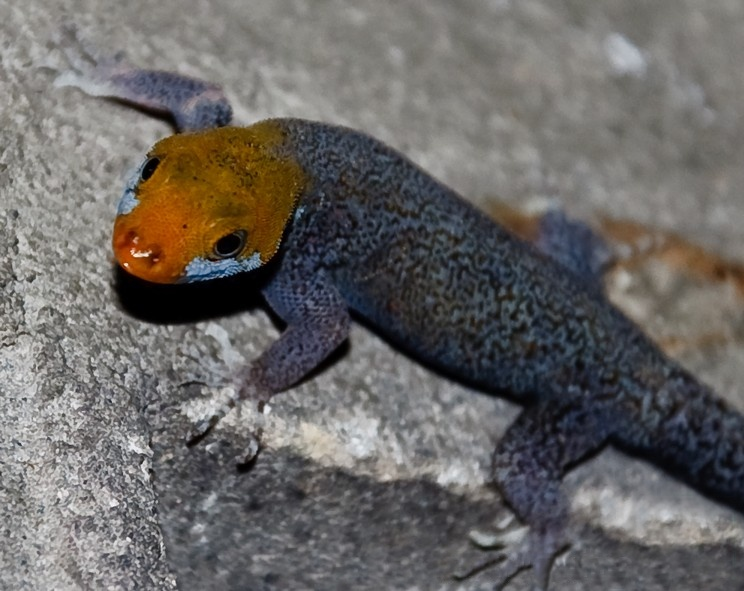
Gonatodes albogularis

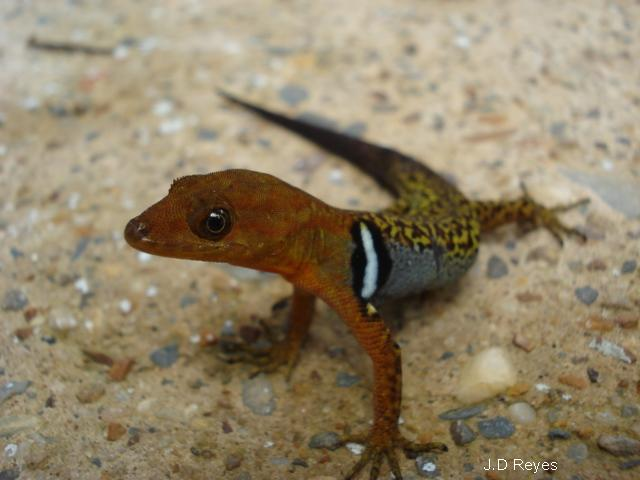
Gonatodes concinnatus, Colombia

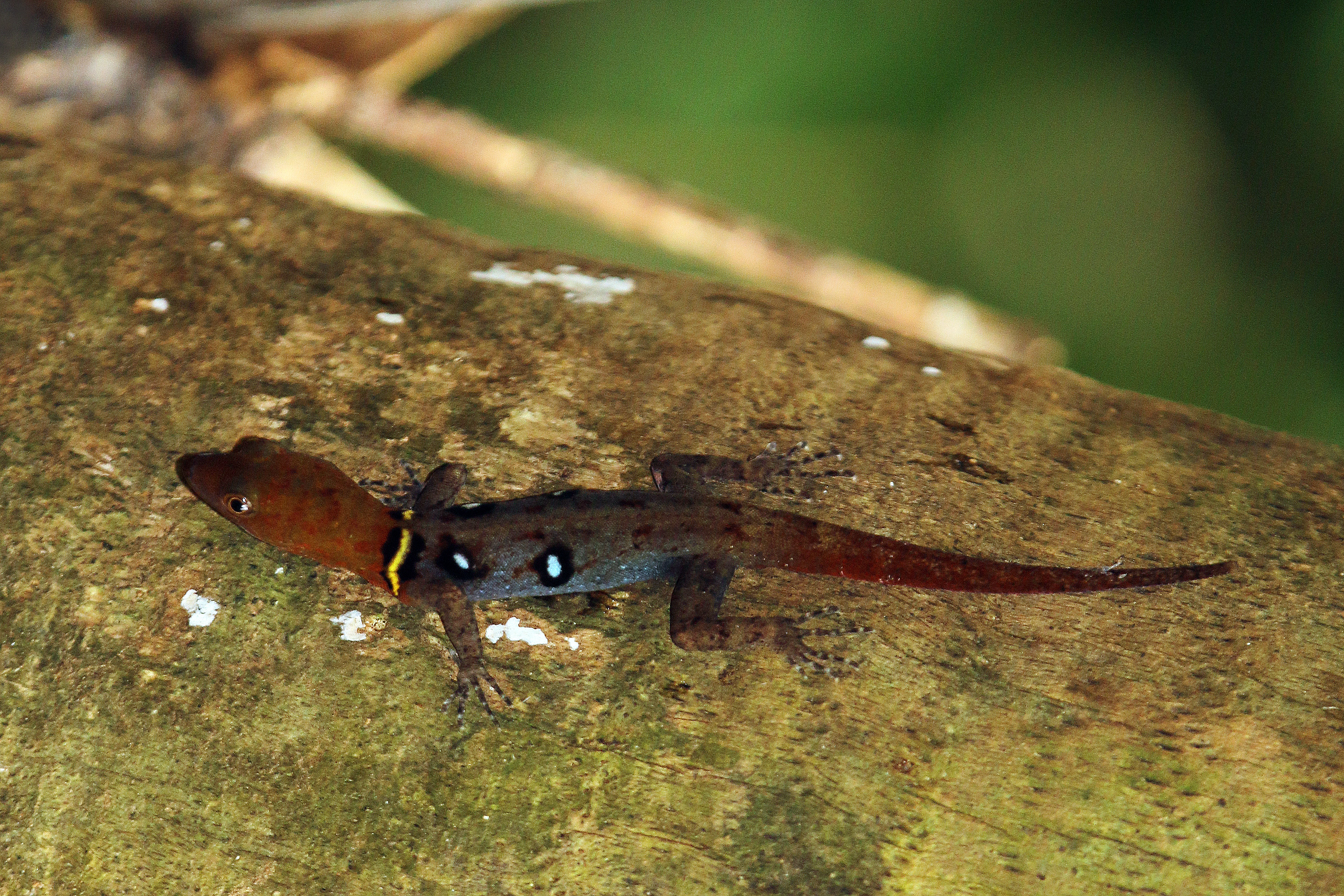
Male ocellated gecko Gonatodes ocellatus, Little Tobago

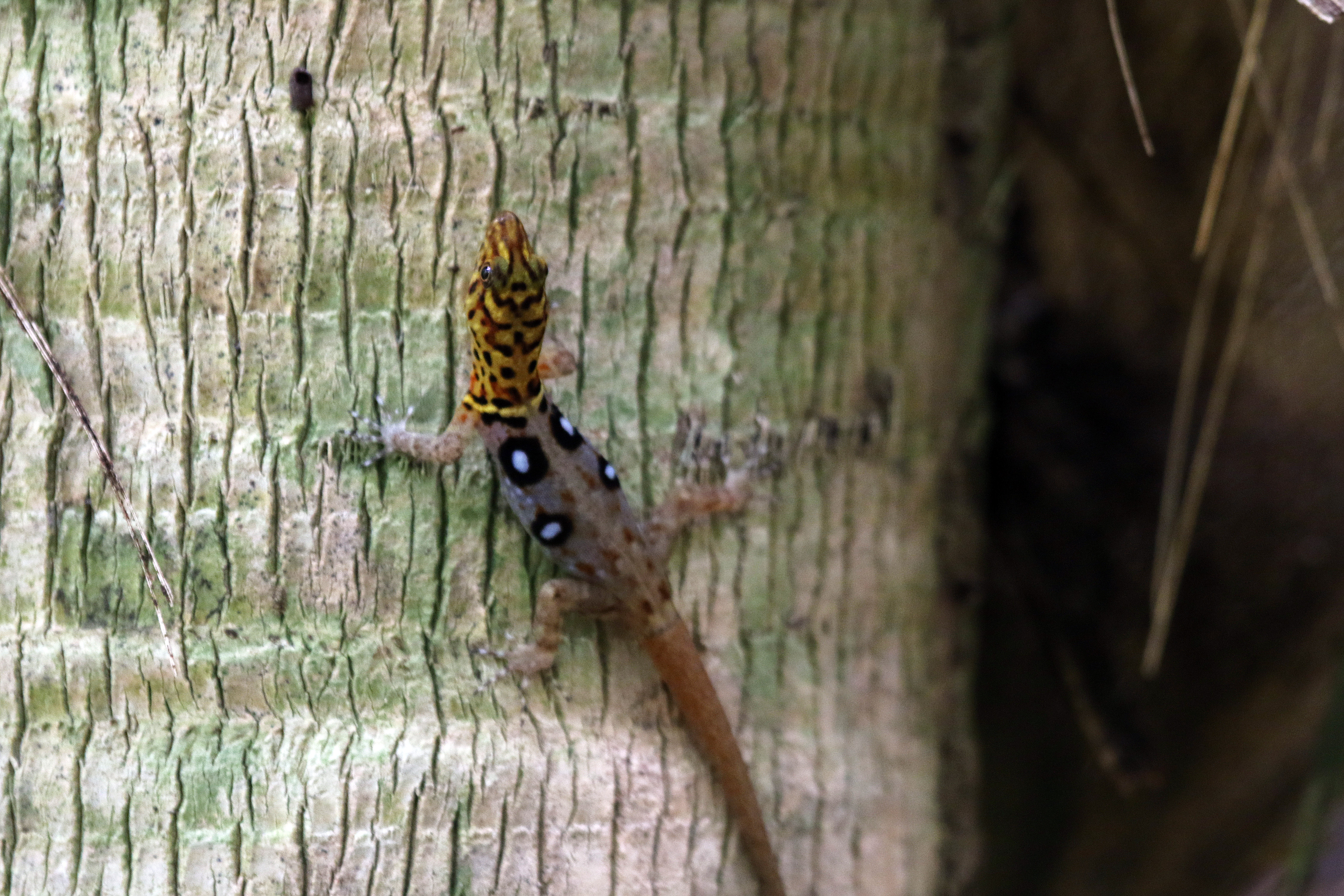
Male ocellated gecko Gonatodes ocellatus, Little Tobago

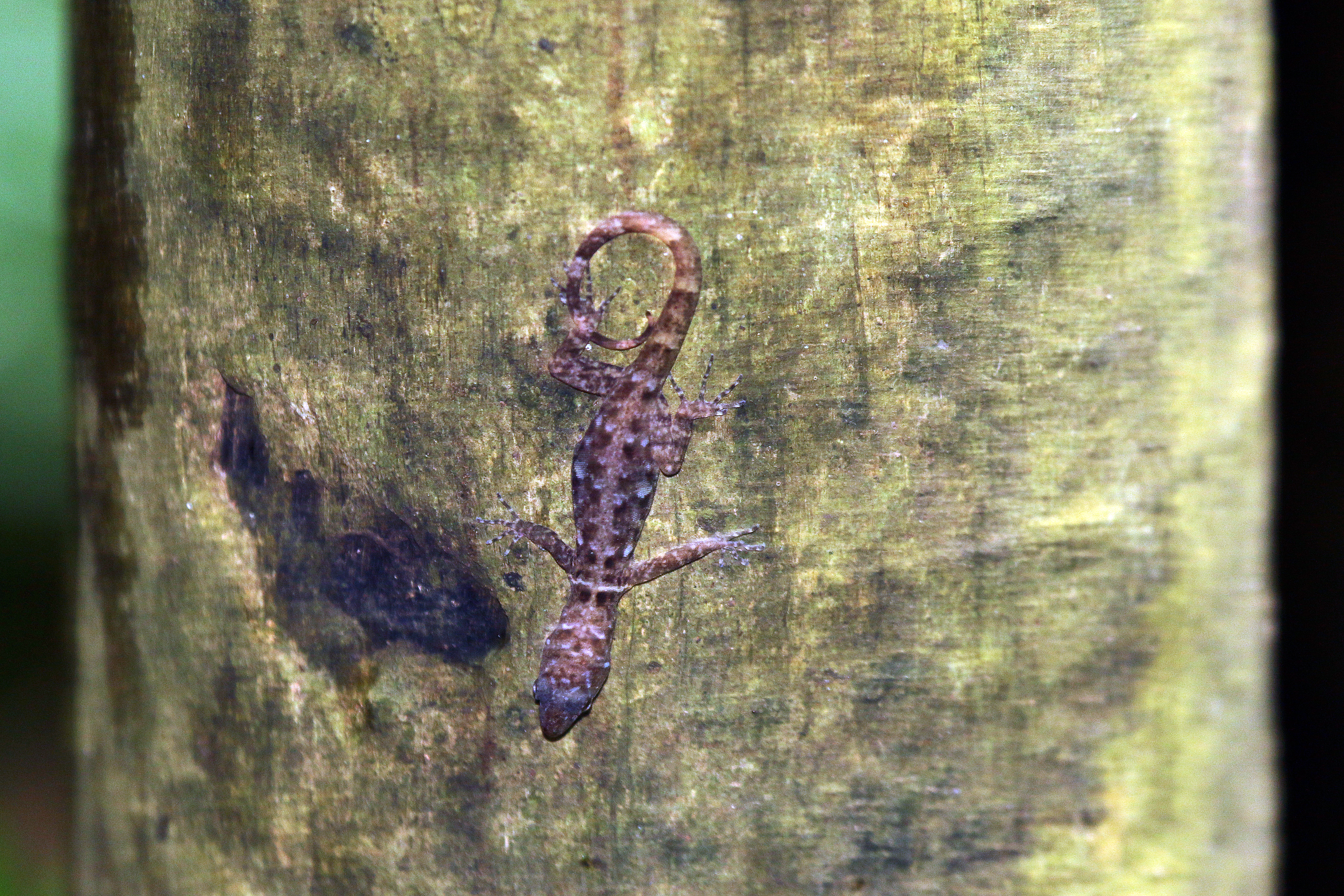
Female ocellated gecko Gonatodes ocellatus, Little Tobago

== Diet ==
The diets of the various species of Gonatodes are composed mainly of very small arthropods.

== Reproduction ==
Clutch size is one, with most species producing several clutches per year, and some utilizing communal egg-laying sites.

== Habitat ==
Most species are humid tropical forest dwelling (some in warm lowlands, and others in somewhat cooler montane regions), with relatively fewer species utilizing more open, drier habitats at forest edge, tropical dry seasonal forest and scrub forest. Some species (usually those that use drier natural habitats) are able to utilize even more open human modified environments; in some cases including highly urbanized areas. Gonatodes usually spend most of their active hours perched anywhere from ground level to about 0.6 metres (2 feet) above ground, sometimes up to 2 or 3 metres (6.6 or 9.8 feet), on vertical or near vertical surfaces of tree trunks, tree stumps, logs and sometimes rocks (as well as on walls and house-posts for those that are able to use human altered environments). They seldom sit exposed to direct strong sunlight (they do not appear to bask), and most seem to prefer shade / filtered light with less exposure to direct sun light.

== Geographic range ==
Species of Gonatodes are found in Central America including southern Mexico, a few Caribbean Islands (including Cuba, Hispaniola, Jamaica and Union Island in St. Vincent and the Grenadines) and the northern part of South America, including Peru, Colombia, Ecuador, Bolivia, Guyana, French Guiana, Suriname, parts of Brazil, Venezuela, the islands of Trinidad and Tobago, and some of the small islands just off the coast of northern South America.

== Introduced species ==
Human mediated introductions have occurred with Gonatodes caudiscutatus in the Galapagos Islands and G. albogularis in Florida. In addition, some species have been transplanted by human activity to various regions within the general range of the genus where the particular species did not previously exist.

== Species ==
The following 34 species are recognized as being valid. Some subspecies are also listed.

- Gonatodes albogularis (A.M.C. Duméril & Bibron, 1836) – white-throated clawed gecko, white-throated gecko, yellow-headed gecko
  - Gonatodes albogularis albogularis (A.M.C. Duméril & Bibron, 1836)
  - Gonatodes albogularis bodinii Rivero-Blanco, 1968
  - Gonatodes albogularis notatus (J.T. Reinhardt & Lütken, 1862)
- Gonatodes alexandermendesi Cole & Kok, 2006
- Gonatodes annularis Boulenger, 1887 – annulated gecko
- Gonatodes antillensis (Lidth de Jeude, 1887) – Antilles gecko, Venezuelan coastal clawed gecko
- Gonatodes astralis Schargel et al., 2010
- Gonatodes atricucullaris Noble, 1921 – Cajamarca gecko
- Gonatodes castanae Carvajal-Cogollo, Eguis-Avendaño & Meza-Joya, 2020 – Castaño's Gecko
- Gonatodes caudiscutatus (Günther, 1859) – shieldhead gecko
- Gonatodes ceciliae Donoso-Barros, 1966 – brilliant clawed gecko, brilliant South American gecko
- Gonatodes chucuri Meneses-Pelayo & Ramírez, 2020 – Chucuri gecko
- Gonatodes concinnatus (O'Shaughnessy, 1881) – O'Shaughnessy's gecko
- Gonatodes daudini Powell & Henderson, 2005 – Grenadines clawed gecko, Union Island clawed gecko, Union Island gecko
- Gonatodes eladioi Nascimento, Ávila-Pires & Cunha, 1987 – South American gecko
- Gonatodes falconensis Shreve, 1947 – Estado Falcón gecko
- Gonatodes hasemani Griffin, 1917 – Haseman's gecko
- Gonatodes humeralis (Guichenot, 1855) – South American clawed gecko, Trinidad gecko
- Gonatodes infernalis Rivas & Schargel, 2008
- Gonatodes lichenosus Rojas-Runjaic et al., 2010 - Perijá lichen gecko
- Gonatodes ligiae Donoso-Barros, 1967
- Gonatodes machelae Rivero-Blanco & Schargel, 2020
- Gonatodes nascimentoi Sturaro & Ávila-Pires, 2011
- Gonatodes naufragus Rivas et al., 2013 – La Blanquilla clawed gecko
- Gonatodes ocellatus (Gray, 1831) – eyespot clawed gecko, eyespot gecko, ocellated gecko
- Gonatodes petersi Donoso-Barros, 1967 – Peters' gecko
- Gonatodes purpurogularis Esqueda, 2004
- Gonatodes rayito Schargel, Rivas, García-Pérez, Rivero-Blanco, Chippindale & Fujita, 2017
- Gonatodes riveroi Sturaro & Ávila-Pires, 2011
- Gonatodes rozei Rivero-Blanco & Schargel, 2012 - Roze's gecko
- Gonatodes seigliei Donoso-Barros, 1966 – Estado Sucre gecko
- Gonatodes superciliaris Barrio-Amorós & Brewer-Carías, 2008 - Sarisariñama forest gecko
- Gonatodes taniae Roze, 1963 – Estado Aragua gecko, ring-necked clawed gecko
- Gonatodes tapajonicus Rodrigues, 1980 – Pará gecko
- Gonatodes timidus Kok, 2011
- Gonatodes vittatus (Lichtenstein, 1856) – striped clawed gecko, Wiegmann's striped gecko

Nota bene: A binomial authority or trinomial authority in parentheses indicates that the species or subspecies was originally described in a genus other than Gonatodes.
