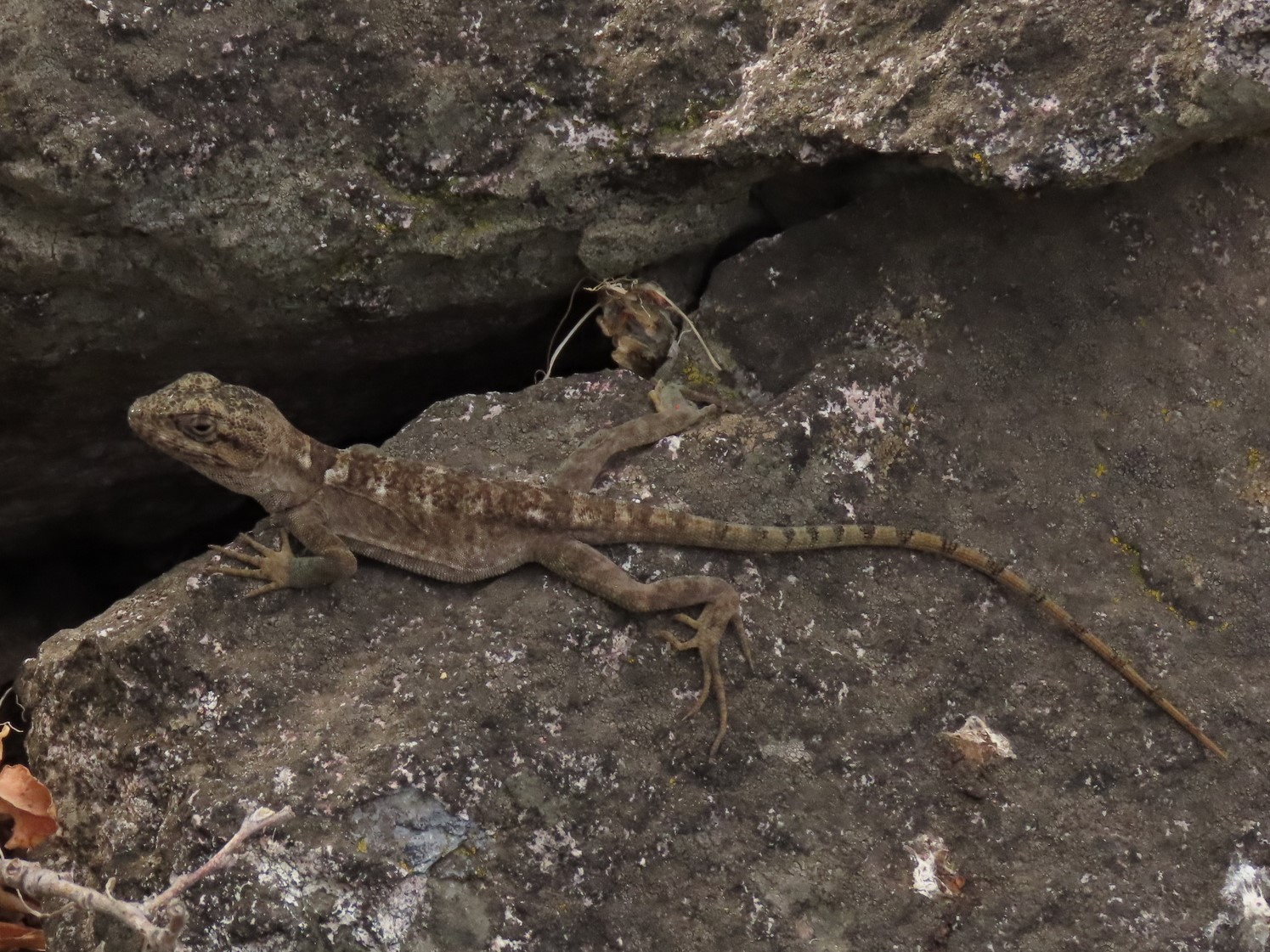

Conservation status
- Endangered (IUCN 3.1)

Scientific classification
- Kingdom: Animalia
- Phylum: Chordata
- Class: Reptilia
- Order: Squamata
- Suborder: Iguania
- Family: Leiosauridae
- Genus: Pristidactylus
- Species: P. valeriae

Binomial name
- Pristidactylus valeriae (Donoso-Barros, 1966)

Synonyms
- Urostrophus valeriae Donoso-Barros, 1966; Cupriguanus valeriae — Donoso-Barros, 1975; Pristidactylus valeriae — Etheridge & E. Williams, 1985

= Pristidactylus valeriae =

Species of lizard

Pristidactylus valeriae is a species of lizard in the family Leiosauridae. The species is endemic to Chile where it is found in the Chilean matorral.

== Etymology ==
The specific name, valeriae, is in honor of Donoso-Barros' fourth daughter, Valeria.

== Habitat ==
The preferred natural habitats of P. vaeriae are forest and shrubland at altitudes of 170–2,280 m (560–7,480 ft).

== Reproduction ==
P. valeriae is oviparous.

== Sources ==
- Hogan, C. Michael, & World Wildlife Fund (2013). Chilean matorral. ed. M.McGinley. Encyclopedia of Earth. National Council for Science and the Environment. Washington, District of Columbia.
