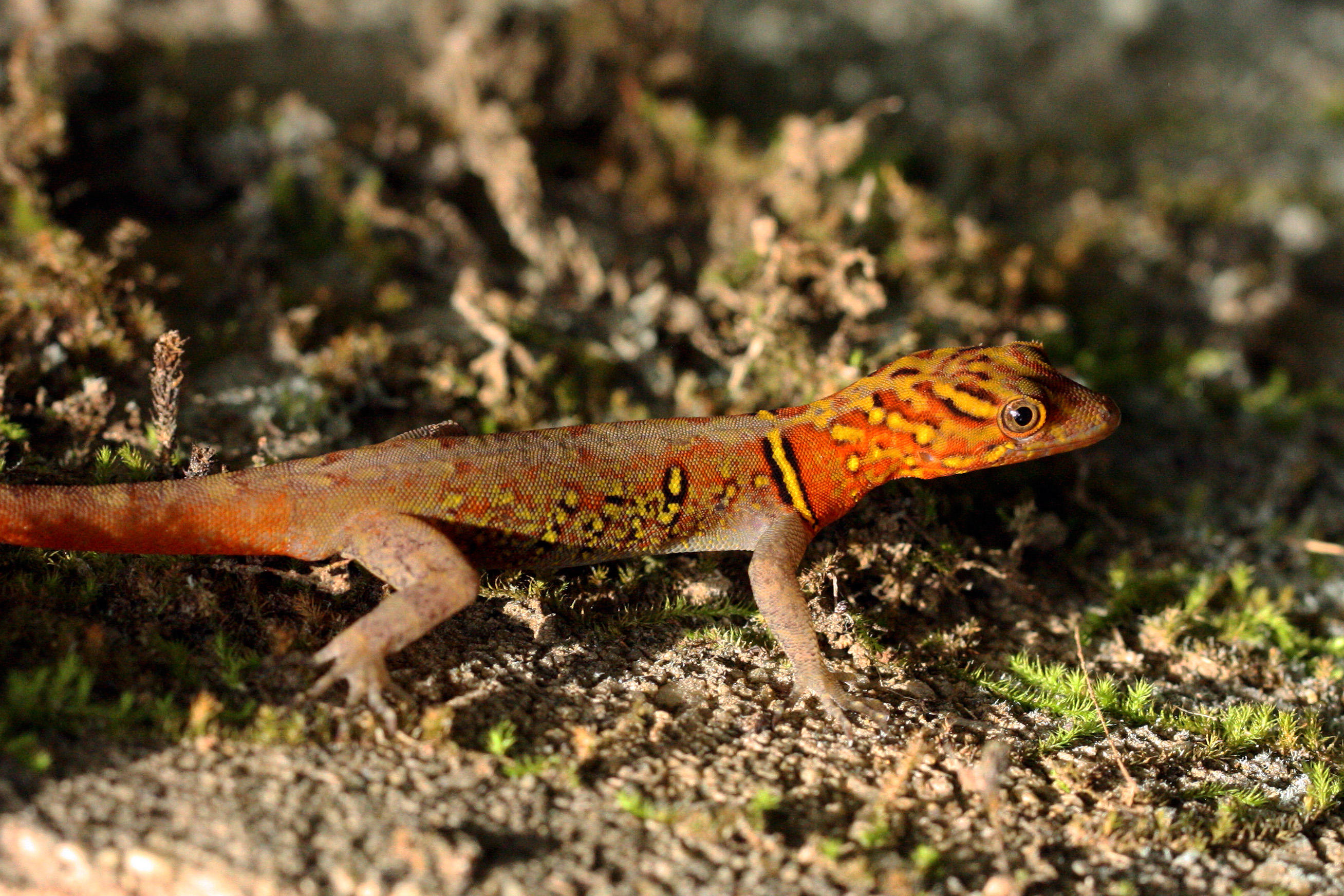

Conservation status
- Least Concern (IUCN 3.1)

Scientific classification
- Kingdom: Animalia
- Phylum: Chordata
- Order: Squamata
- Suborder: Gekkota
- Family: Sphaerodactylidae
- Genus: Gonatodes
- Species: G. ceciliae

Binomial name
- Gonatodes ceciliae Donoso-Barros, 1966

= Brilliant South American gecko =

Species of lizard

The brilliant South American gecko (Gonatodes ceciliae), also known commonly as the brilliant clawed gecko, is a species of lizard in the family Sphaerodactylidae. The species is native to northern South America.

== Etymology ==
The specific name, ceciliae, is in honor of Cecilia Donoso-Barros, who is the daughter of Chilean herpetologist Roberto Donoso-Barros.

== Geographic range ==
Gonatodes ceciliae is found in Trinidad and Venezuela.

== Habitat ==
The preferred natural habitat of Gonatodes ceciliae is forest, at altitudes from sea level to 900 m (3,000 ft).

== Description ==
Only males of Gonatodes ceciliae have brilliant coloration. Females are grayish brown, with darker blotches.

== Behavior ==
Gonatodes ceciliae is diurnal.

== Diet ==
Gonatodes ceciliae preys upon small arthropods and small snails.

== Reproduction ==
Gonatodes ceciliae is oviparous.
