= Liolaemus kriegi =

Conservation status
- Least Concern (IUCN 3.1)

Scientific classification
- Kingdom: Animalia
- Phylum: Chordata
- Class: Reptilia
- Order: Squamata
- Suborder: Iguania
- Family: Liolaemidae
- Genus: Liolaemus
- Species: L. kriegi

Binomial name
- Liolaemus kriegi L. Müller & Hellmich, 1939

Synonyms
- Liolaemus ceii Donoso-Barros, 1971

Species of lizard

Liolaemus kriegi, also known commonly as Krieg's tree iguana, is a species of lizard in the family Liolaemidae. The species is endemic to Argentina.

== Etymology ==
The specific name, kriegi, is in honor of German zoologist Hans Krieg (1888–1970).

== Geographic range ==
L. kriegi is found in the Andean highlands of southwestern Argentina, in Neuquén Province and western Río Negro Province.

== Habitat ==
The preferred natural habitat of L. kriegi is rocky areas of grassland or shrubland near water, at altitudes of 950–2,000 m (3,120–6,560 ft).

== Behavior ==
L. kriegi is terrestrial and saxicolous (rock-dwelling).

== Reproduction ==
The mode of reproduction of L. kriegi has been described as viviparous and as ovoviviparous.
