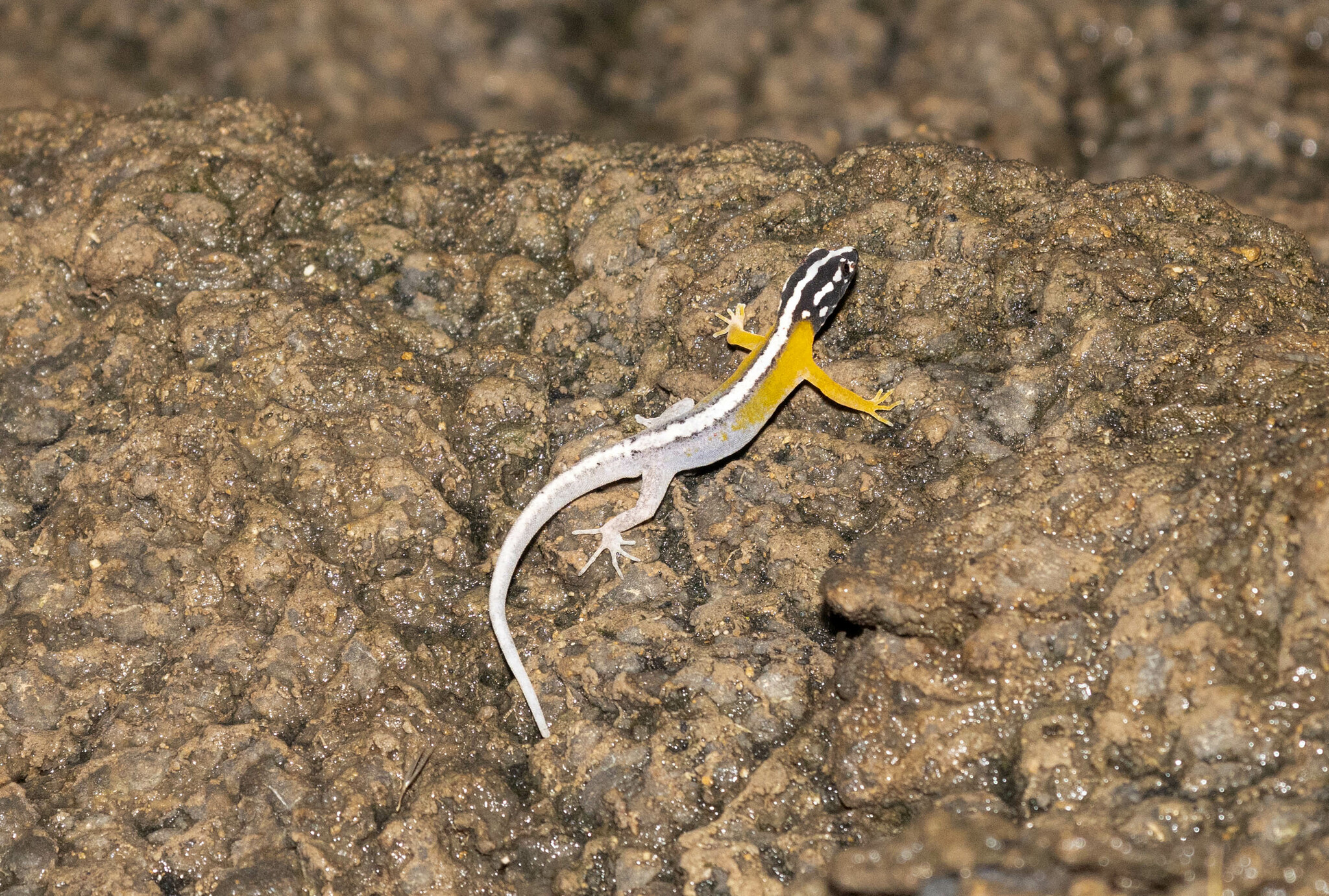
- Male specimen

Conservation status
- Near Threatened (IUCN 3.1)

Scientific classification
- Kingdom: Animalia
- Phylum: Chordata
- Class: Reptilia
- Order: Squamata
- Suborder: Gekkota
- Family: Sphaerodactylidae
- Genus: Gonatodes
- Species: G. atricucullaris

Binomial name
- Gonatodes atricucullaris Noble, 1921

= Cajamarca gecko =

Species of lizard

The Cajamarca gecko (Gonatodes atricucullaris) is a species of lizard in the Sphaerodactylidae family found in Peru.
