= Gonatodes nascimentoi =

Conservation status
- Least Concern (IUCN 3.1)

Scientific classification
- Kingdom: Animalia
- Phylum: Chordata
- Class: Reptilia
- Order: Squamata
- Suborder: Gekkota
- Family: Sphaerodactylidae
- Genus: Gonatodes
- Species: G. nascimentoi

Binomial name
- Gonatodes nascimentoi Sturaro & Ávila-Pires, 2011

Species of lizard

Gonatodes nascimentoi is a species of lizard in the family Sphaerodactylidae. The species is endemic to Brazil.

== Etymology ==
The specific name, nascimentoi, is in honor of Brazilian herpetologist Francisco Paiva do Nascimento.

== Geographic range ==
G. nascimentoi is found in the Brazilian states of Amapá and Pará.

== Habitat ==
The preferred natural habitat of G. nascimentoi is forest.

== Description ==
G. nascimentoi is a large species for its genus. Maximum recorded snout-to-vent length (SVL) is 5.6 cm (2.2 in).

== Behavior ==
G. nascimentoi is diurnal.
