= Coquimbo marked gecko =

Scientific classification
- Kingdom: Animalia
- Phylum: Chordata
- Order: Squamata
- Suborder: Gekkota
- Family: Phyllodactylidae
- Genus: Garthia
- Species: G. penai

Binomial name
- Garthia penai Donoso-Barros, 1966

Synonyms
- Homonota gaudichaudii penai Donoso-Barros & Vanzolini, 1965 (nomen nudum); Garthia penai Donoso-Barros, 1966; Homonota penai — Kluge, 1993; Garthia penai — Abdala & Moro, 1996

Species of lizard

The Coquimbo marked gecko (Garthia penai) is a species of lizard in the family Phyllodactylidae. The species is endemic to Chile. It is the smallest reptile of this country.

== Etymology ==
The specific name, penai, is in honor of Chilean entomologist Luis Enrique Peña Guzmán (1921–1995).

== Reproduction ==
G. penai is oviparous.
