= Skrjabinelazia =

Scientific classification
- Kingdom: Animalia
- Phylum: Nematoda
- Class: Chromadorea
- Order: Rhabditida
- Family: Seuratidae
- Genus: Skrjabinelazia; Sypliaxov, 1930

Genus of parasitic roundworms

Skrjabinelazia is a genus of nematodes belonging to the family Seuratidae.

The species of this genus are found in the Americas and Asia.

Species:

- Skrjabinelazia galliardi Chabaud, 1973
- Skrjabinelazia hoffmanni Li, 1934
- Skrjabinelazia machidai Hasegawa, 1984
- Skrjabinelazia pyrenaica Roca & Garcia-Adell, 1988
- Skrjabinelazia taurica Sypliakov, 1930
- Skrjabinelazia vozae Lhermitte, Bain & Hering-Hagenbeck, 2007
