= Gonatodes timidus =

Conservation status
- Least Concern (IUCN 3.1)

Scientific classification
- Kingdom: Animalia
- Phylum: Chordata
- Class: Reptilia
- Order: Squamata
- Suborder: Gekkota
- Family: Sphaerodactylidae
- Genus: Gonatodes
- Species: G. timidus

Binomial name
- Gonatodes timidus Kok, 2011

Species of lizard

Gonatodes timidus is a species of lizard in the Sphaerodactylidae family found in Guyana.
