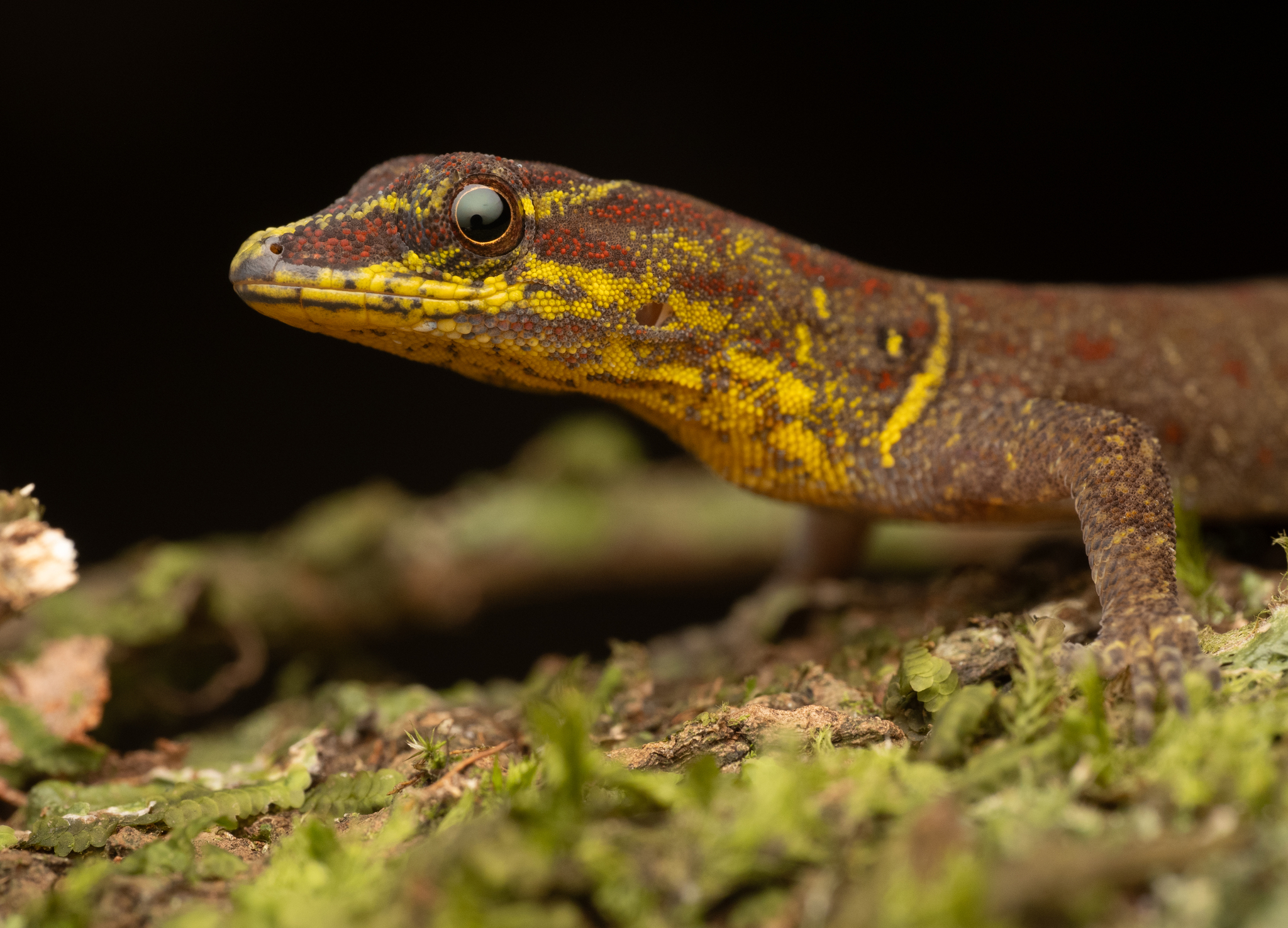

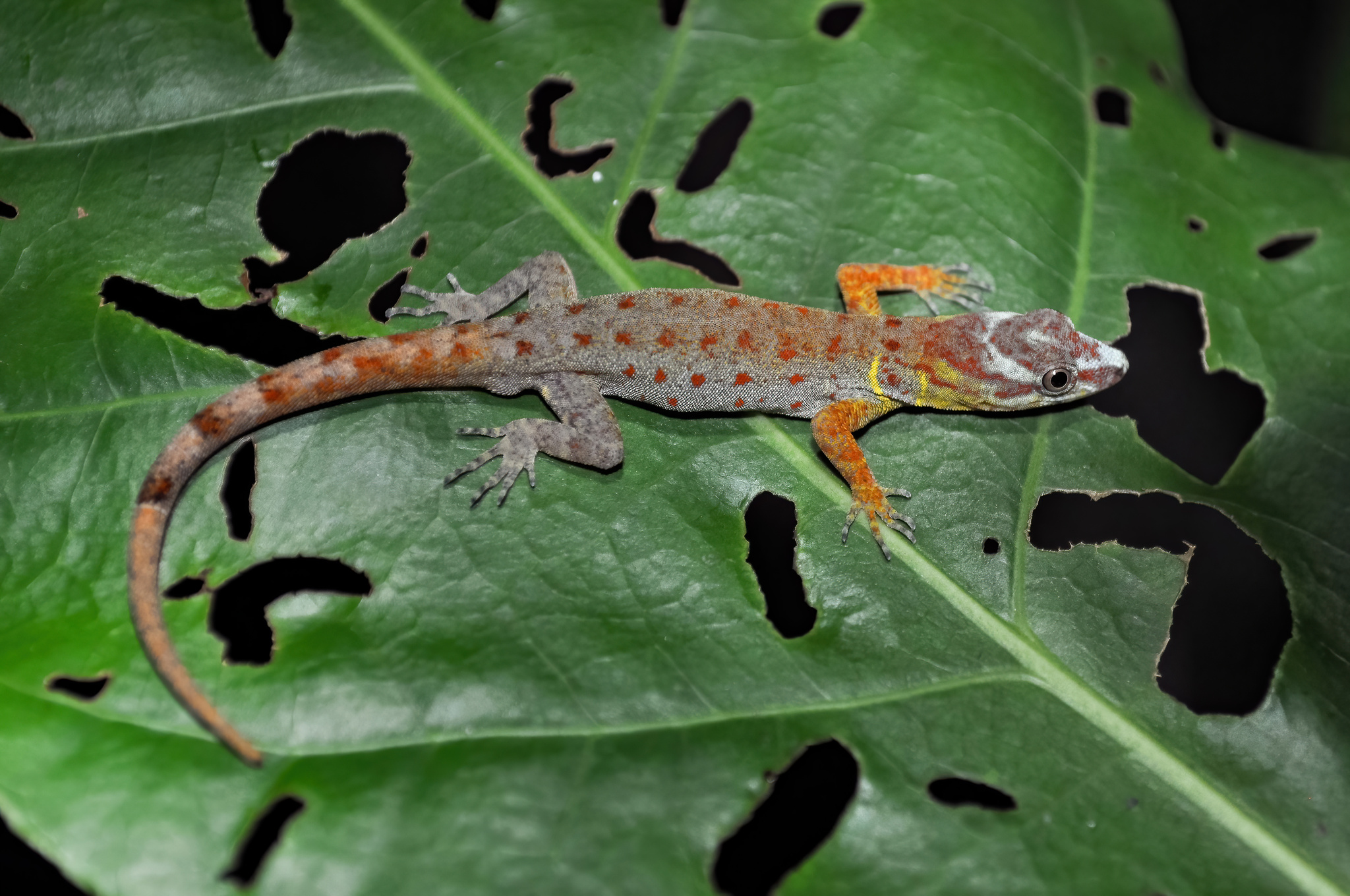

Scientific classification
- Domain: Eukaryota
- Kingdom: Animalia
- Phylum: Chordata
- Class: Reptilia
- Order: Squamata
- Infraorder: Gekkota
- Family: Sphaerodactylidae
- Genus: Gonatodes
- Species: G. humeralis

Binomial name
- Gonatodes humeralis (Guichenot, 1855)

= Trinidad gecko =

Species of lizard

Trinidad gecko (Gonatodes humeralis) is a species of gecko in the Sphaerodactylidae family native to northern South America and the Caribbean. It is known to occur in Trinidad, French Guiana, Suriname, Ecuador, Guyana, Peru, Bolivia, Venezuela, Colombia, and Brazil. The Gonatodes humeralis demonstrates sexual dimorphism in coloration, with males rapidly changing through vibrant colors like red, purple, and orange to respond to social interactions. In contrast, females tend to change to dull and camouflaged colors to ensure safety for themselves and their offspring.
