= Pristidactylus alvaroi =

Conservation status
- Endangered (IUCN 3.1)

Scientific classification
- Kingdom: Animalia
- Phylum: Chordata
- Class: Reptilia
- Order: Squamata
- Suborder: Iguania
- Family: Leiosauridae
- Genus: Pristidactylus
- Species: P. alvaroi

Binomial name
- Pristidactylus alvaroi (Donoso-Barros, 1975)

Synonyms
- Cupriguanus alvaroi Donoso-Barros, 1975; Pristidactylus alvaroi — Etheridge & E. Williams, 1985

Species of lizard

Pristidactylus alvaroi is a species of lizard in the family Leiosauridae. The species is endemic to the Chilean Matorral ecoregion within Chile.

== Etymology ==
The specific name, alvaroi, is in honor of Álvaro Donoso-Barros, the son of herpetologist Roberto Donoso-Barros, who first described the species in 1975.

== Habitat ==
The preferred natural habitat of P. alvaroi is forest, at elevations of 1,000–2,200 m (3,300–7,200 ft).

== Reproduction ==
P. alvaroi is oviparous.

== Sources ==
- Hogan, C. Michael, & World Wildlife Fund (2013). Chilean Matorral. Ed. Mark McGinley. Encyclopedia of Earth. National Council for Science and the Environment. Washington DC
