= Liolaemus hellmichi =

Conservation status
- Vulnerable (IUCN 3.1)

Scientific classification
- Kingdom: Animalia
- Phylum: Chordata
- Class: Reptilia
- Order: Squamata
- Suborder: Iguania
- Family: Liolaemidae
- Genus: Liolaemus
- Species: L. hellmichi

Binomial name
- Liolaemus hellmichi Donoso-Barros, 1975

Species of lizard

Liolaemus hellmichi, commonly known as Hellmich's tree iguana, is a species of lizard in the family Liolaemidae. This species is endemic to the Chilean matorral ecoregion within the nation of Chile.

== Etymology ==
The specific name, hellmichi, is in honor of German herpetologist Walter Hellmich.

== Habitat ==
The preferred natural habitat of L. hellmichi is desert, at altitudes of 1,000–1,400 m (3,300–4,600 ft).

== Diet ==
L. hellmichi preys upon arthropods.

== Reproduction ==
L. hellmichi is oviparous.
