= Gonatodes alexandermendesi =

Conservation status
- Least Concern (IUCN 3.1)

Scientific classification
- Kingdom: Animalia
- Phylum: Chordata
- Class: Reptilia
- Order: Squamata
- Suborder: Gekkota
- Family: Sphaerodactylidae
- Genus: Gonatodes
- Species: G. alexandermendesi

Binomial name
- Gonatodes alexandermendesi Cole & Kok, 2006

Species of lizard

Gonatodes alexandermendesi is a species of lizard in the family Sphaerodactylidae. The species is indigenous to northern South America.

== Etymology ==
The specific name, alexandermendesi, is in honor of Guyanese businessman Alexander Mendes for his aid to visiting naturalists.

== Geographic range ==
Gonatodes alexandermendesi is found in Guyana and Venezuela.

== Habitat ==
The preferred natural habitat of Gonatodes alexandermendesi is forest, at altitudes of 120–900 m (390–2,950 ft).

== Behavior ==
Gonatodes alexandermendesi is diurnal.

== Description ==
Gonatodes alexandermendesi may attain a snout-to-vent length (SVL) of 5 cm (2.0 in). It has a very elongate spine on the supraciliary flap above the eye.

== Reproduction ==
Gonatodes alexandermendesi is oviparous.
