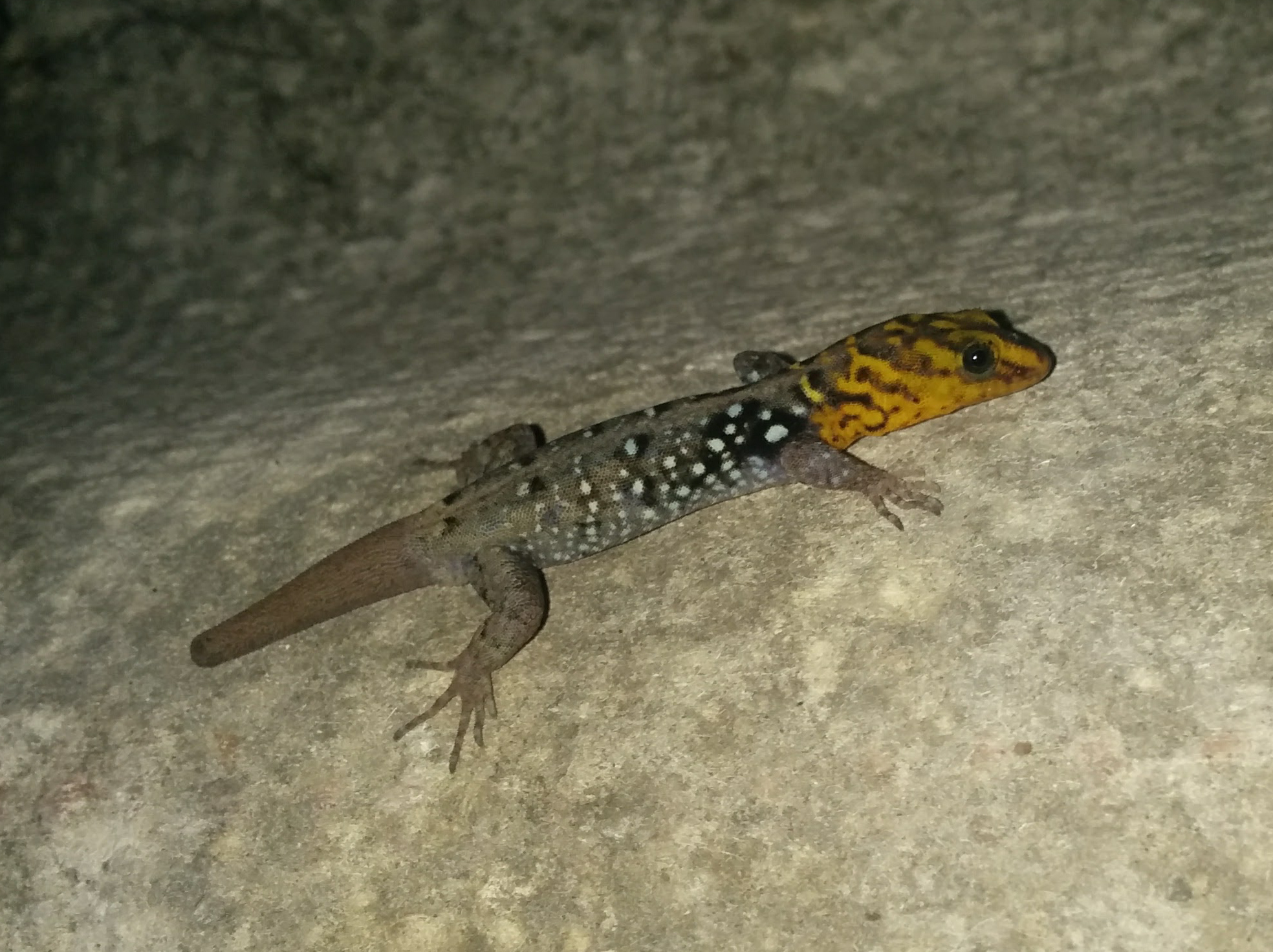

Conservation status
- Least Concern (IUCN 3.1)

Scientific classification
- Kingdom: Animalia
- Phylum: Chordata
- Class: Reptilia
- Order: Squamata
- Suborder: Gekkota
- Family: Sphaerodactylidae
- Genus: Gonatodes
- Species: G. caudiscutatus

Binomial name
- Gonatodes caudiscutatus (Günther, 1859)

= Shieldhead gecko =

Species of lizard

The shieldhead gecko (Gonatodes caudiscutatus) is a species of lizard in the Sphaerodactylidae family native to Ecuador and Colombia.
