= Para gecko =

Scientific classification
- Kingdom: Animalia
- Phylum: Chordata
- Class: Reptilia
- Order: Squamata
- Suborder: Gekkota
- Family: Sphaerodactylidae
- Genus: Gonatodes
- Species: G. tapajonicus

Binomial name
- Gonatodes tapajonicus Rodrigues, 1980

Species of lizard

The Para gecko (Gonatodes tapajonicus) is a species of lizard in the Sphaerodactylidae family native to Brazil.
