= Bachia marcelae =

Scientific classification
- Kingdom: Animalia
- Phylum: Chordata
- Class: Reptilia
- Order: Squamata
- Family: Gymnophthalmidae
- Genus: Bachia
- Species: B. marcelae

Binomial name
- Bachia marcelae (Donoso-Barros, 1968)

Species of lizard

Bachia marcelae is a species of lizard in the family Gymnophthalmidae. It is endemic to Venezuela.
