= Gonatodes chucuri =

Scientific classification
- Kingdom: Animalia
- Phylum: Chordata
- Class: Reptilia
- Order: Squamata
- Suborder: Gekkota
- Family: Sphaerodactylidae
- Genus: Gonatodes
- Species: G. chucuri

Binomial name
- Gonatodes chucuri Meneses-Pelayo & Ramirez, 2020

Species of lizard

The Chucuri gecko (Gonatodes chucuri) is a species of lizard in the family Sphaerodactylidae. The species is endemic to Colombia.
