= Estado Aragua gecko =

Conservation status
- Least Concern (IUCN 3.1)

Scientific classification
- Kingdom: Animalia
- Phylum: Chordata
- Class: Reptilia
- Order: Squamata
- Suborder: Gekkota
- Family: Sphaerodactylidae
- Genus: Gonatodes
- Species: G. taniae

Binomial name
- Gonatodes taniae Roze, 1963

Species of lizard

The Estado Aragua gecko (Gonatodes taniae), also known commonly as the ring-necked clawed gecko, is a species of lizard in the family Sphaerodactylidae. The species is endemic to Venezuela.

== Etymology ==
The specific name, taniae, is in honor of biologist Tania Cobo who collected the holotype.

== Geographic range ==
G. taniae is found in northwestern Venezuela, in the Venezuelan states of Aragua, Carabobo, and Yaracuy.

== Habitat ==
The preferred natural habitat of G. taniae is forest, at altitudes of 800–1,100 m (2,600–3,600 ft).

== Behavior ==
G. taniae is predominantly diurnal.

== Reproduction ==
G.taniae is oviparous.
