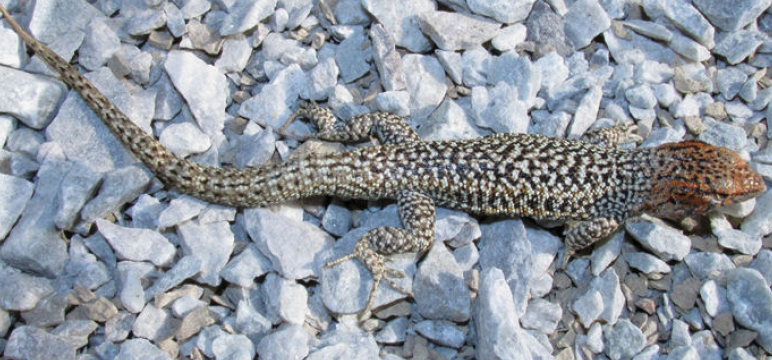

Conservation status
- Least Concern (IUCN 3.1)

Scientific classification
- Kingdom: Animalia
- Phylum: Chordata
- Class: Reptilia
- Order: Squamata
- Suborder: Iguania
- Family: Liolaemidae
- Genus: Liolaemus
- Species: L. constanzae

Binomial name
- Liolaemus constanzae Donoso-Barros, 1961

Synonyms
- Liolaemus donosoi Ortiz, 1975

= Liolaemus constanzae =

Species of lizard

Liolaemus constanzae, commonly known as Constanza's tree iguana, is a species of lizard in the family Liolaemidae. The species is endemic to South America.

== Etymology ==
The specific name, constanzae, is in honor of Constanza Donoso-Barros, eldest daughter of Roberto Donoso-Barros.

The synonym, Liolaemus donosoi, was named in honor of Roberto Donoso-Barros.

== Geographic range ==
L. constanzae is found in Chile, possibly Argentina (no confirmed records seem to exist), and is expected to be present in Bolivia.

== Habitat ==
The preferred natural habitats of L. constanzae are sandy and rocky areas in desert and shrubland, at altitudes of 1,400–3,900 m (4,600–12,800 ft).

== Diet ==
L. constanzae feeds on plants and seeds, and it preys upon small invertebrates.

== Reproduction ==
L. constanzae is oviparous.
