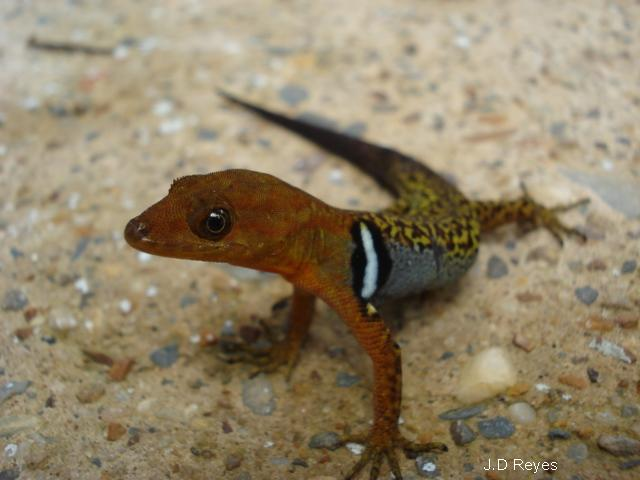

Conservation status
- Least Concern (IUCN 3.1)

Scientific classification
- Kingdom: Animalia
- Phylum: Chordata
- Class: Reptilia
- Order: Squamata
- Suborder: Gekkota
- Family: Sphaerodactylidae
- Genus: Gonatodes
- Species: G. concinnatus

Binomial name
- Gonatodes concinnatus (O'Shaughnessy, 1881)

= O'Shaughnessy's gecko =

Species of reptile

O'Shaughnessy's gecko (Gonatodes concinnatus) is a diurnal species of gecko found in Ecuador (Canelos), Colombia, Venezuela, Brazil, and Peru.
