= Sarisariñama Forest gecko =

Conservation status
- Least Concern (IUCN 3.1)

Scientific classification
- Kingdom: Animalia
- Phylum: Chordata
- Class: Reptilia
- Order: Squamata
- Suborder: Gekkota
- Family: Sphaerodactylidae
- Genus: Gonatodes
- Species: G. superciliaris

Binomial name
- Gonatodes superciliaris Barrio-Amorós & Brewer-Carías, 2008

Species of lizard

The Sarisariñama Forest gecko (Gonatodes superciliaris) is a species of lizard in the Sphaerodactylidae family native to Venezuela.
