= Liolaemus paulinae =

Conservation status
- Critically Endangered (IUCN 3.1)

Scientific classification
- Kingdom: Animalia
- Phylum: Chordata
- Class: Reptilia
- Order: Squamata
- Suborder: Iguania
- Family: Liolaemidae
- Genus: Liolaemus
- Species: L. paulinae

Binomial name
- Liolaemus paulinae Donoso-Barros, 1961

Species of lizard

Liolaemus paulinae is a species of lizard in the family Liolaemidae. The species is endemic to Chile.

== Etymology ==
Both the specific name, paulinae, and the common name, Paulina's tree iguana, are in honor of Paulina who is one of the daughters of Roberto Donoso-Barros.

== Geographic distribution ==
Liolaemus paulinae occurs in Antofagasta Region, Chile.

== Habitat ==
The preferred natural habitat of Liolaemus paulinae is shrubland, at elevations of 2,200–2,600 m (7,200–8,500 ft). The holotype was collected at an elevation of 2,600 metres (8,500 ft).

== Diet ==
Liolaemus paulinae preys upon arthropods.

== Reproduction ==
Liolaemus paulinae is ovoviviparous.
