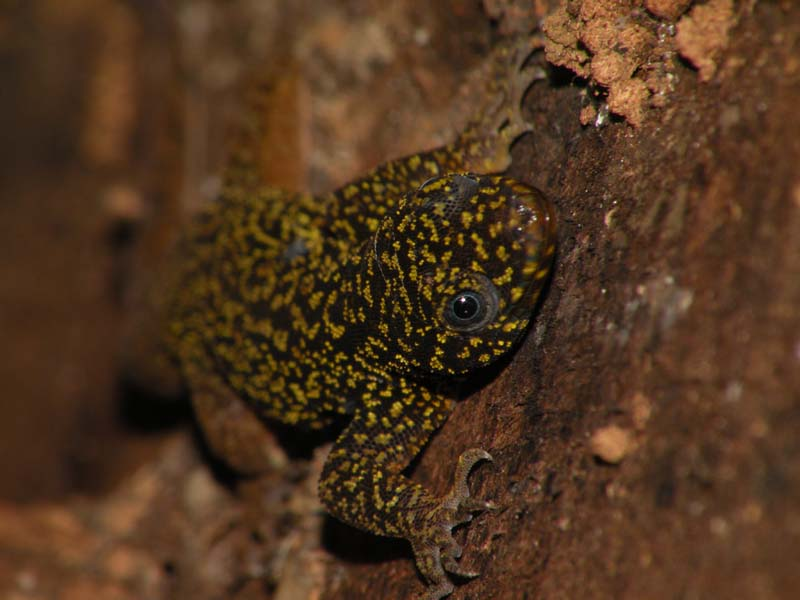

Scientific classification
- Kingdom: Animalia
- Phylum: Chordata
- Class: Reptilia
- Order: Squamata
- Suborder: Gekkota
- Family: Sphaerodactylidae
- Genus: Gonatodes
- Species: G. annularis

Binomial name
- Gonatodes annularis Boulenger, 1887

= Annulated gecko =

Species of lizard

The annulated gecko (Gonatodes annularis) is a species of lizard in the family Sphaerodactylidae found in South America and the Antilles. It is known to occur in Brazil, French Guiana, Guyana, Suriname, and Venezuela.
