= Liolaemus donosobarrosi =

Conservation status
- Least Concern (IUCN 3.1)

Scientific classification
- Kingdom: Animalia
- Phylum: Chordata
- Class: Reptilia
- Order: Squamata
- Suborder: Iguania
- Family: Liolaemidae
- Genus: Liolaemus
- Species: L. donosobarrosi

Binomial name
- Liolaemus donosobarrosi (Cei, 1974)

Synonyms
- Ctenoblepharis donosobarrosi Cei, 1974; Liolaemus donosobarrosi — Cei, 1979; Liolaemus (Eulaemus) donosobarrosi — Morando et al., 2020

Species of lizard

Liolaemus donosobarrosi, commonly known as Donoso-Barros' tree iguana, is a species of lizard in the family Liolaemidae. The species is endemic to Argentina.

== Etymology ==
The specific name, donosobarrosi, is in honor of Chilean herpetologist Roberto Donoso-Barros.

== Geographic range ==
L. donosobarrosi is found in central Argentina, in the provinces of Mendoza, Neuquén, and Río Negro.

== Habitat ==
The preferred natural habitat of L. donosobarrosi is shrubland, at altitudes of 900–1,200 m (3,000–3,900 ft).

== Reproduction ==
L. donosobarrosi is oviparous.
