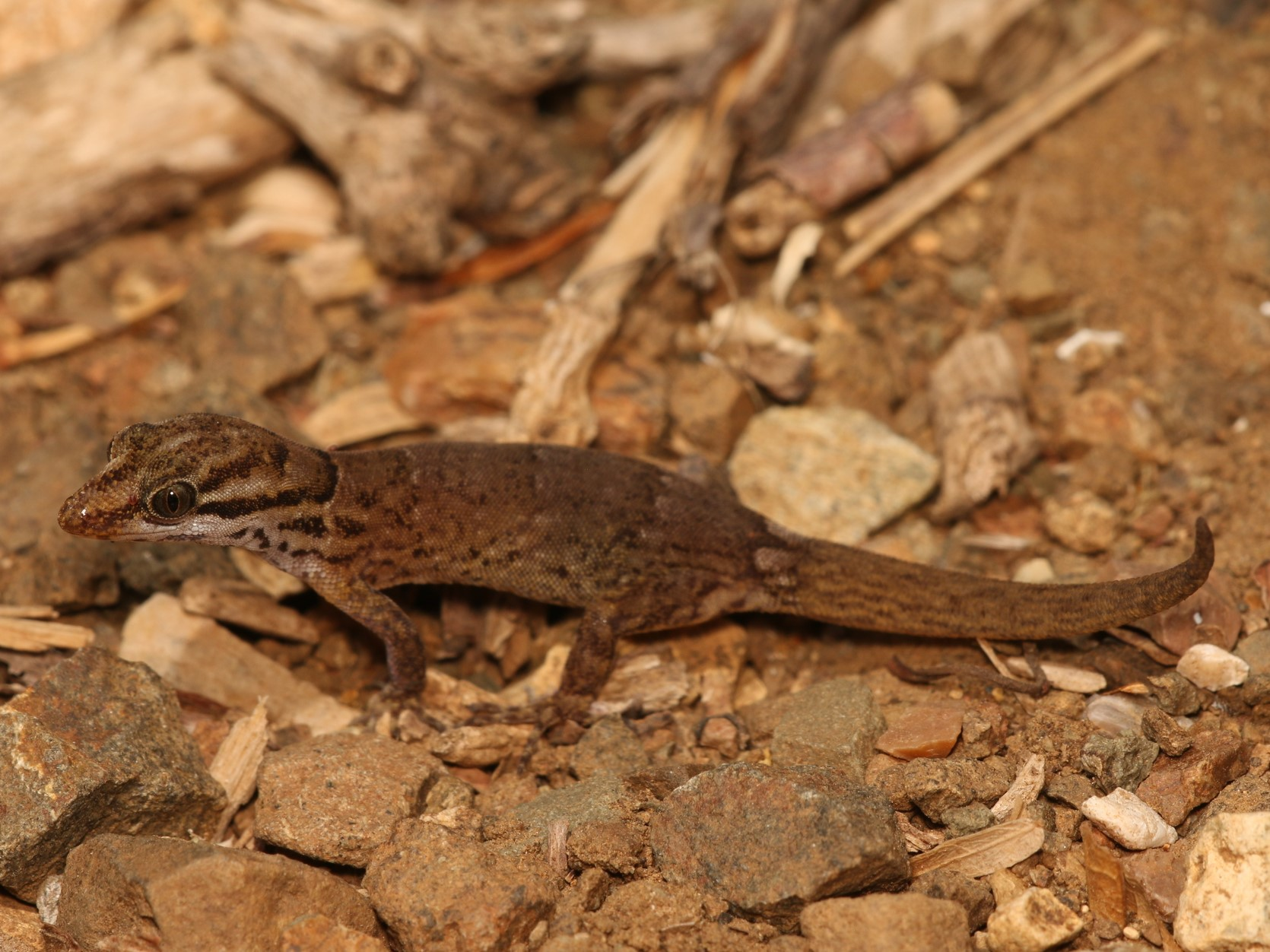

Conservation status
- Least Concern (IUCN 3.1)

Scientific classification
- Kingdom: Animalia
- Phylum: Chordata
- Class: Reptilia
- Order: Squamata
- Suborder: Gekkota
- Family: Sphaerodactylidae
- Genus: Gonatodes
- Species: G. antillensis

Binomial name
- Gonatodes antillensis (Lidth de Jeude, 1887)

= Antilles gecko =

Species of lizard

The Antilles gecko (Gonatodes antillensis) is a species of lizard in the Sphaerodactylidae family found in the West Indies and northern Venezuela.
