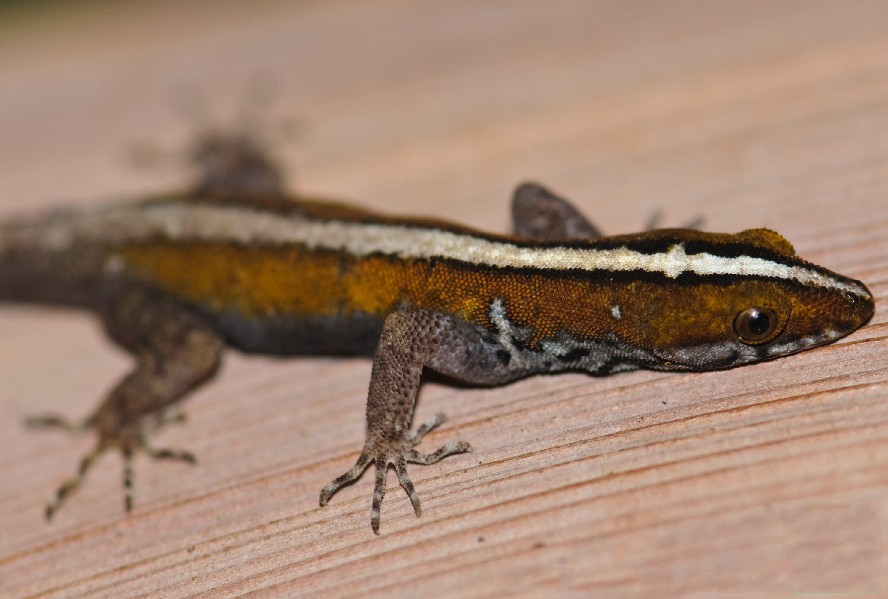

Conservation status
- Least Concern (IUCN 3.1)

Scientific classification
- Domain: Eukaryota
- Kingdom: Animalia
- Phylum: Chordata
- Class: Reptilia
- Order: Squamata
- Infraorder: Gekkota
- Family: Sphaerodactylidae
- Genus: Gonatodes
- Species: G. vittatus

Binomial name
- Gonatodes vittatus (Lichtenstein, 1856)

= Wiegmann's striped gecko =

Species of lizard

Wiegmann's striped gecko (Gonatodes vittatus) is a species of lizard in the Sphaerodactylidae family native to northern South America.
