= Seuratidae =

Scientific classification
- Kingdom: Animalia
- Phylum: Nematoda
- Class: Chromadorea
- Order: Rhabditida
- Family: Seuratidae

Family of parasitic roundworms

Seuratidae is a family of nematodes belonging to the order Rhabditida.

== Genera ==
Genera:

- Bainechina Smales, 1999
- Chabaudechina Smales, 1999
- Durettechina Smales, 2000
