= Roberto Donoso-Barros =

Chilean botanist and herpetologist

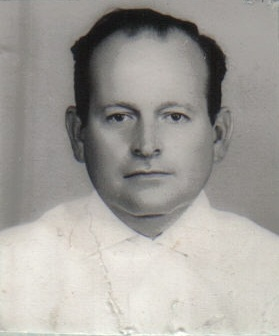
- Born: Roberto Donoso-Barros; October 5, 1921; Santiago, Chile
- Died: August 2, 1975 (aged 53); Concepción, Chile
- Education: University of Chile

Roberto Donoso-Barros (October 5, 1921 – August 2, 1975) was a Chilean zoologist, naturalist, and herpetologist.

== Early life and education ==
Donoso-Barros was born in Santiago, Chile in 1921 or 1922. He attended the University of Chile in Santiago, earning his M.D. from the school in 1947.

== Career ==
Donoso-Barros joined the faculty of the University of Chile in 1954. In 1965, he became a professor at the University of Concepción. He also worked at the Universidad de Oriente in Venezuela, and at the Smithsonian Institution in the United States.

Donoso-Barros was a prolific herpetological authority in Chile. In 1966, he published Reptiles de Chile which collected and reported on all lizard species described to date in Chile.

Species described by Donoso-Barros include:

- Garthia penai (Donoso-Barros, 1966)
- Liolaemus brattstroemi Donoso-Barros, 1961 – synonym of Liolaemus pictus
- Liolaemus ceii Donoso-Barros, 1971 – synonym of Liolaemus kriegi
- Liolaemus constanzae Donoso-Barros, 1961
- Liolaemus hellmichi Donoso-Barros, 1974
- Liolaemus paulinae Donoso-Barros, 1961
- Liolaemus sarmientoi Donoso-Barros, 1973
- Gonatodes ceciliae Donoso-Barros, 1966
- Gonatodes ligiae Donoso-Barros, 1967
- Microlophus atacamensis (Donoso-Barros, 1966)
- Microlophus tarapacensis (Donoso-Barros, 1966)
- Bachia marcelae Donoso-Barros & Garrido, 1964
- Alsodes vanzolinii (Donoso-Barros, 1974)
- Pristidactylus alvaroi (Donoso-Barros, 1974)
- Pristidactylus valeriae (Donoso-Barros, 1974)

Nota bene: A binomial authority in parentheses indicates that the species was originally described in a different genus.

The gecko Gonatodes ligiae remains somewhat mysterious as it was only described in a short note in which Donoso-Barros did not explain the name, but it is probably named after some person, as many other species he described. However, the ominous Ligia remains a mystery.

=== Accolades ===
Donoso-Barros was awarded the Abate Molina Prize by the Chilean Academy of Sciences in 1966. He was also awarded the Atenea Award in 1966 for Reptiles de Chile.

A proposed subspecies of Chelonoidis chilensis, C. chilensis donosobarrosi, is named for Donoso-Barros. A species of lizard, Liolaemus donosobarrosi, is named after him.

== Personal life ==
Donoso-Barros had five daughters and two sons. However, in his obituary, Jaime Péfaur only mentions 6 children, namely Constanza, Roberto, Paulina, Marcela, Valeria and Cecilia. Péfaur did not mention his son Alvaro, after which Donoso-Barros named one species, Pristidactylus alvaroi, as he dedicated names to all his other children (except Roberto), namely

- Gonatodes ceciliae, named for his daughter Cecilia
- Liolaemus paulinae, named for his daughter Pauline
- Pristidactylus valeriae, named for his daughter Valeria
- Liolaemus constanzae, named for his daughter Constanza
- Pristidactylus alvaroi, named for his son Álvaro
- Bachia marcelae, named for his daughter Marcela.

Donoso-Barros is the grandfather of Gaspar Domínguez Donoso (son of his daughter Valeria) and of Chilean-British herpetologist Daniel Pincheira-Donoso.

Donoso-Barros died on August 2, 1975, as a result of a traffic accident.
