= Walter E. Schargel =

American herpetologist (born 1975)

Walter Ernesto Schargel
- Born: February 21, 1975; Raleigh, North Carolina, United States
- Education: Universidad Nacional Experimental de la Gran Caracas; University of Texas at Arlington
- Known for: Systematics and taxonomy of Neotropical amphibians and reptiles
- Scientific career
- Fields: Herpetology

Walter Ernesto Schargel (born 21 February 1975) is an American herpetologist and university lecturer whose research focuses on systematics, taxonomy, and conservation of Neotropical reptiles and amphibians.

== Early life and education ==
Schargel’s family moved to Venezuela when he was two years old. He grew up in a rural environment and completed his education within the Venezuelan educational system from preschool through college.

In 1998, he earned a Bachelor of Engineering degree in Environmental Engineering from the Universidad Nacional Experimental de la Gran Caracas. He subsequently worked for two years as a project coordinator in environmental consulting for the Venezuelan Ministry of the Environment before returning to the United States in 2000.

He completed a Master of Science degree in Biology at the University of Texas at Arlington in 2003 with a thesis entitled Taxonomy of certain related and problematic snakes in the genus Atractus (Colubridae: Dipsadinae) with comments on hemipenial morphology in the genus. In 2008, he earned a Ph.D. in Quantitative Biology from the same institution, with a dissertation on species limits and phylogenetic systematics of diurnal geckos of the genus Gonatodes.

== Academic career ==
Following completion of his doctorate, Schargel accepted a lecturer position at the University of Texas at Arlington, where he established a research program in Neotropical herpetology. Since 2009, he has served as an associate professor, teaching courses in biostatistics, biometrics, data analysis, and introductory biology.

== Research ==
Schargel’s research centers on systematic biology, integrating morphological, anatomical, ecological, and molecular data to delimit species and infer phylogenetic relationships among Neotropical amphibians and reptiles. A major focus of his work is the systematics of diurnal geckos of the genus Gonatodes, for which he has described several new species.

In addition to taxonomic research, he is active in conservation biology and has contributed to assessments of extinction risk for numerous Neotropical reptile species under the criteria of the International Union for Conservation of Nature (IUCN).

== Publications ==
Schargel has authored and co-authored a substantial body of peer-reviewed scientific literature on amphibian and reptile systematics, taxonomy, and conservation, as documented in his Google Scholar bibliography.
