= José Miguel Cei =

Argentinian herpetologist (1918–2007)

José Miguel Alfredo María Cei
- Born: Giuseppe Michele Alfredo Maria Cei; March 23, 1918; San Miniato, Province of Pisa, Italy
- Died: January 8, 2007 (aged 88); Mendoza, Argentina
- Citizenship: Italy → Argentina
- Education: University of Florence; University of Pisa
- Known for: Studies on South American amphibians and reptiles
- Scientific career
- Fields: Herpetology
- Workplaces: National University of Tucumán; National University of Cuyo
- Doctoral advisor: Nello Beccari
- Author abbrev. (zoology): Cei

José Miguel Alfredo María Cei (born Giuseppe Michele Alfredo Maria Cei, 23 March 1918 – 8 January 2007) was an Italian-Argentine herpetologist and author of numerous standard works on the herpetofauna of Argentina and Chile.

== Biography ==
Cei’s paternal ancestors were Greek immigrants from the Cyclades island of Kea who settled in Tuscany, which explains the origin of his surname. His mother was a descendant of Pietro Andrea Mattioli, a well-known botanist and herbalist of the Renaissance in the 16th century. His parents owned a seed production company founded by his grandfather in the 1860s.

From 1935 to 1939, Cei studied at the University of Florence, where one of his teachers was Nello Beccari (1883–1957), a comparative neuroanatomist specializing in amphibians and reptiles. His first expedition, to Ethiopia in 1939, sparked his lifelong interest in ethnology and ecology. He earned his doctorate in 1940 from the University of Pisa and subsequently became an assistant professor of zoology in Florence.

Cei’s early research focused on the comparative anatomy of mammals, the respiration of cyclostomes, and the reproductive cycle of amphibians. His interest in amphibians led to a collegial relationship with Robert Mertens of the Senckenberg Museum in Frankfurt am Main, who became his mentor.

In 1940, Cei was conscripted into the Italian Army, serving first as an artillery officer in North Africa and later in the topographic service. Following Italy’s armistice in 1943, he was briefly held in a British prisoner-of-war camp, then joined Italian partisans fighting against German forces. He was captured again but soon released through Mertens’ intervention. By mid-1944 he worked with U.S. occupation forces, and in 1945 he returned to Florence, teaching in courses for American soldiers organized by the U.S. Army in Europe.

After the war, Cei conducted research in Senegal before emigrating to Argentina in November 1947. He became professor of biology at the National University of Tucumán and gained Argentine citizenship in 1952. He later served as director of both the Institute of Biology and the Institute of General Biology and Experimental Embryology. In 1950 he was among the founders of the university’s medical faculty.

In 1955, Cei joined the National University of Cuyo in Mendoza Province on the eastern slopes of the Andes, where he worked as professor and director of the Institute of Animal Biology until his retirement in 1980. Cei held visiting professorships in Angola, Chile, Italy, Portugal, and the United States. From 1986 to 1998, he collaborated with the Museo Regionale di Scienze Naturali di Torino and served as scientific adviser to several Argentine national and provincial agencies. He was also on the executive committee that organized the First World Congress of Herpetology in the United Kingdom in 1989.

Cei was appointed honorary professor at the National University of Río Cuarto (1981), the University of Tucumán (1990), and the University of Cuyo (1995). In 2005, he received an honorary doctorate from the National University of San Luis, and in 2006, the Mendoza legislature awarded him the Libertador General San Martín lifetime achievement prize.

Cei’s first publication (1940) dealt with the ferns of Ethiopia’s Kafa Cloud Forest. He went on to publish nearly 370 papers on fish, amphibians, reptiles, and mammals, covering topics such as reproductive cycles, ecology, physiology, biochemistry, systematics, evolution, and biogeography. He regularly contributed to European, South American, and North American journals, including the Journal of Herpetology.

For three decades, Cei collaborated with the Italian pharmacologist Vittorio Erspamer at the Sapienza University of Rome to study biogenic amines extracted from frog skin. Using biochemical techniques, Cei was able to distinguish sister taxa, publishing numerous systematic works beginning in the 1950s.

He described nearly 50 new taxa of frogs, snakes, and lizards, including species of Atelognathus, Leptodactylus, Odontophrynus, Phrynopus, Telmatobius, Atractus, Elapomorphus, Cnemidophorus, Ctenoblepharis, Diplolaemus, Homonota, Phymaturus, Pristidactylus, Tropidurus, Vilcunia, and especially Liolaemus. He had a particular interest in the natural history and taxonomy of reptiles from the arid and semi-arid regions of South America.

Cei authored several books, including textbooks on animal biogeography (1946) and general biology (1951), as well as a Darwin anthology (1947). His monograph Batracios de Chile appeared in 1962, followed by Amphibians of Argentina (1980), with supplements in 1987 and 2001 (the latter coauthored with Esteban O. Lavilla). His multi-volume works on Argentine reptiles covered central and southern regions (1986) and northern and eastern regions (1993). In 1993, he co-authored with American herpetologists James R. Dixon and John Wiest a revision of the neotropical snake genus Chironius.

For 25 years, his wife Sylvana Silvi Cei assisted him in the field and as illustrator of his publications. Together they traveled over 350,000 km during their research. She died in 1998.

== Species described ==
Cei described numerous new taxa of amphibians and reptiles throughout his career. The following list includes many of the species he described or co-described:

- Alsodes pehuenche (Cei, 1976)
- Atelognathus praebasalticus (Cei & Roig, 1968)
- Atelognathus reverberii (Cei, 1969)
- Atelognathus salai (Cei, 1984)
- Atelognathus solitarius (Cei, 1970)
- Atractus canedii (Scrocchi & Cei, 1991)
- Chironius laurenti (Dixon, Wiest & Cei, 1993)
- Cnemidophorus serranus (Cei & Martori, 1991)
- Diplolaemus sexcinctus (Cei, Scolaro & Videla, 2003)
- Homonota andicola (Cei, 1978)
- Lepidobatrachus llanensis (Reig & Cei, 1963)
- Leptodactylus chaquensis (Cei, 1950)
- Liolaemus archeforus (Donoso-Barros & Cei, 1971)
- Liolaemus austromendocinus (Cei, 1974)
- Liolaemus baguali (Cei & Scolaro, 1983)
- Liolaemus canqueli (Cei, 1975)
- Liolaemus coeruleus (Cei & Ortiz-Zapata, 1983)
- Liolaemus cuyanus (Cei & Scolaro, 1980)
- Liolaemus donosobarrosi (Cei, 1974)
- Liolaemus duellmani (Cei, 1978)
- Liolaemus eleodori (Cei, 1985)
- Liolaemus exploratorum (Cei & Williams, 1984)
- Liolaemus famatinae (Cei, 1980)
- Liolaemus flavipiceus (Cei & Videla, 2003)
- Liolaemus gallardoi (Cei & Scolaro, 1982)
- Liolaemus insolitus (Cei, 1982)
- Liolaemus petrophilus (Donoso-Barros & Cei, 1971)
- Liolaemus rabinoi (Cei, 1974)
- Liolaemus riojanus (Cei, 1979)
- Liolaemus sanjuanensis (Cei, 1982)
- Liolaemus saxatilis (Avila & Cei, 1992)
- Liolaemus silvanae (Donoso-Barros & Cei, 1971)
- Liolaemus somuncurae (Cei & Scolaro, 1981)
- Liolaemus telsen (Cei, 1999)
- Liolaemus thermarum (Videla & Cei, 1996)
- Liolaemus uptoni (Scolaro & Cei, 2006)
- Liolaemus xanthoviridis (Cei & Scolaro, 1980)
- Liolaemus zullyae (Cei, 1996)
- Odontophrynus achalensis (di Tada, Barla, Martori & Cei, 1984)
- Odontophrynus barrioi (Cei, Ruiz & Beçak, 1982)
- Odontophrynus carvalhoi (Savage & Cei, 1965)
- Odontophrynus lavillai (Cei, 1985)
- Phalotris cuyanus (Cei, 1984)
- Phymaturus calcogaster (Scolaro & Cei, 2003)
- Phymaturus indistinctus (Cei & Castro, 1973)
- Phymaturus mallimaccii (Cei, 1980)
- Phymaturus nevadoi (Cei & Roig, 1975)
- Phymaturus payuniae (Cei & Castro, 1973)
- Phymaturus punae (Cei, Etheridge & Videla, 1985)
- Phymaturus somuncurensis (Cei & Castro, 1973)
- Phymaturus verdugo (Cei & Videla, 2003)
- Phymaturus zapalensis (Cei & Castro, 1973)
- Pristidactylus nigroiugulus (Cei, Scolaro & Videla, 2001)
- Rhinella achalensis (Cei, 1972)
- Rhinella atacamensis (Cei, 1962)
- Somuncuria somuncurensis (Cei, 1969)
- Telmatobius contrerasi (Cei, 1977)
- Tropidurus etheridgei (Cei, 1982)
- Tropidurus guarani (Alvarez, Cei & Scolaro, 1994)

== Eponyms ==
Species named in his honor include:

- Liolaemus ceii (Donoso-Barros, 1971)
- Liophis ceii (Dixon, 1991)
- Atelognathus ceii (Basso, 1998)
- Phymaturus ceii (Scolaro & Ibargüengoytía, 2008)
