= Batrachyla nibaldoi =

Conservation status
- Least Concern (IUCN 3.1)

Scientific classification
- Kingdom: Animalia
- Phylum: Chordata
- Class: Amphibia
- Order: Anura
- Family: Batrachylidae
- Genus: Batrachyla
- Species: B. nibaldoi

Binomial name
- Batrachyla nibaldoi Formas, 1997

Species of frog

Batrachyla nibaldoi is a species of frog in the family Batrachylidae. It is endemic to Chile and known from the Los Lagos and Aysén Regions between Villa O'Higgins in the south and Kent and Melchor Islands in the north; there is a record from Alao Island further north but this might represent Batrachyla taeniata. The specific name nibaldoi honors Nibaldo Bahamonde, Chilean marine biologist, in recognition of his "remarkable contribution to the development of the zoology in Chile". Common name Nibaldo's wood frog has been coined for it.

== Description ==
Adult females measure 35–41 mm (1.4–1.6 in) in snout–vent length; male length is not reported. The snout is rounded in dorsal view and sloping in lateral profile. The tympanum is visible; the supra-tympanic fold is evident. The fingers and toes are slender and have moderately pointed tips. The fingers have no webbing whereas the toes have thin, basal webbing. Dorsal ground color is from light brown or yellowish brown to grayish, with dark brown spots that forming longitudinal lines. There is a dark canthal band, continuing behind the eye to the tympanic region. The ventrum is white.

== Habitat and conservation ==
Batrachyla nibaldoi occur in steppe habitat in valleys surrounded by forest of Nothofagus antarctica, Nothofagus betuloides and Drymis winteri. They are often found under logs rocks and in shrub habitat. Males call from lagoons and temporary pools with plenty of vegetation. Eggs are laid under rocks and moss and when rain floods, larvae develop in the water.

This species is locally abundant, including along the Carretera Austral. Its range includes protected areas, e.g., Laguna San Rafael National Park. The introduced American mink is a potential threat.
