= Liolaemus attenboroughi =

Scientific classification
- Kingdom: Animalia
- Phylum: Chordata
- Class: Reptilia
- Order: Squamata
- Suborder: Iguania
- Family: Liolaemidae
- Genus: Liolaemus
- Species: L. attenboroughi

Binomial name
- Liolaemus attenboroughi Sánchez, Morando & Ávila, 2023

Species of lizard

Liolaemus attenboroughi is a species of lizard in the family Liolaemidae. The species is endemic to Argentina, where it can be found in the Patagonian Steppe of northwestern Chubut province. It is viviparous and omnivorous.

== Taxonomy and naming ==
L. attenboroughi was described in 2023 and named in honor of British biologist Sir David Attenborough. It is a member of the L. kingii group.
