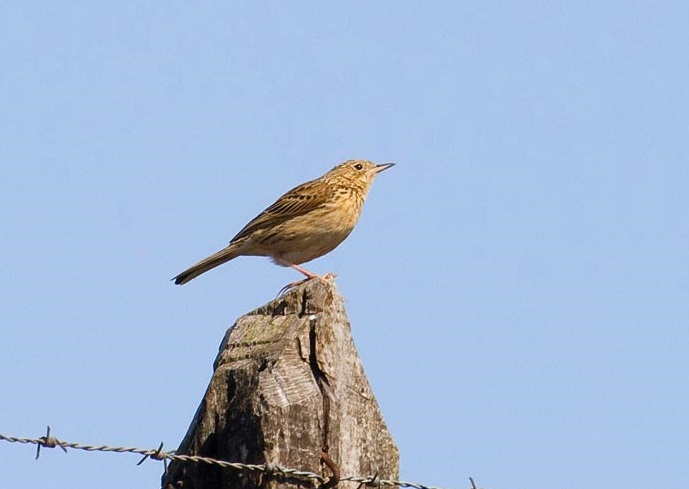

Conservation status
- Least Concern (IUCN 3.1)

Scientific classification
- Kingdom: Animalia
- Phylum: Chordata
- Class: Aves
- Order: Passeriformes
- Family: Motacillidae
- Genus: Anthus
- Species: A. hellmayri

Binomial name
- Anthus hellmayri Hartert, EJO, 1909
- Breeding Year-round

= Hellmayr's pipit =

Species of bird

Hellmayr's pipit (Anthus hellmayri) is a species of bird in the family Motacillidae, the wagtails and pipits. It is found in Argentina, Bolivia, Brazil, Chile, Paraguay, Peru, and Uruguay.

== Taxonomy and systematics ==
Hellmayr's pipit was described by Ernst Hartert in 1909 with its current binomial Anthus hellmayri. Hartert's specific epithet hellmayri honors Austrian ornithologist Carl Eduard Hellmayr; its English name came later.

Hellmayr's pipit has these three subspecies:

- A. h. hellmayri (Hartert, EJO, 1909)
- A. h. dabbenei (Hellmayr, 1921)
- A. h. brasilianus (Hellmayr, 1921)

Some authors suggest that genetic differences among the subspecies are large enough that two full species may be present.

== Description ==
Hellmayr's pipit is about 14 to 16 cm (5.5 to 6.3 in) long. Subspecies A. h. brasilianus weighs 16.5 to 20 g (0.58 to 0.71 oz) The sexes have the same plumage. Adults of the nominate subspecies A. h. hellmayri have a pale buff head with a paler area around the eye. Their upperparts are pale buff with bold blackish brown streaks. Their wings are dusky with whitish edges on the primaries and tertials and buff edges on the secondaries. Their wing coverts have buff edges that show as two wing bars. Their tail is mostly dusky with mostly buffy white outermost feathers. Their throat and underparts are buffy white with thin dusky streaks on the breast and flanks. Subspecies A. h. dabbenei is almost identical to the nominate but has a white spot near the end of the next-to-outermost pair of tail feathers. A. h. brasilianus has cinnamon edges on all of its wing feathers and its underparts have a cinnamon tinge. All subspecies have a dark brown iris, a blackish maxilla, a pale pinkish to yellowish mandible with a dark tip, and bright pink legs and feet.

== Distribution and habitat ==
Hellmayr's pipit has a highly disjunct distribution. The subspecies are found thus:

- A. h. hellmayri: eastern slope of the Andes from Puno Department in far southeastern Peru south through Bolivia into northwestern Argentina to La Rioja Province; separately in Córdoba Province; one record in Peru's Ayacucho Department
- A. h. dabbenei: Argentina from Córdoba and Entre Ríos provinces south to Santa Cruz Province and in adjoining eastern Chile; separately in Argentina on the Somuncurá Plateau in southeastern Río Negro Province
- A. h. brasilianus: southeastern Brazil from southern Espírito Santo and southern Minas Gerais south; southeastern Paraguay; from Paraguay south across northeastern Argentina's Corrientes Province into far southern Brazil; from southern Brazil south through eastern Uruguay into northeastern Argentina to eastern Buenos Aires Province

Hellmayr's pipit inhabits a wide variety of open landscapes. In the western part of its range it favors moist puna grasslands. In the east it is more of a generalist, occurring in Pampas grasslands, rocky hillsides, pastures, and agricultural areas. Everywhere it favors short grass or short herbaceous foliage. The nominate subspecies occurs between 2,450 and 3,350 m (8,000 and 11,000 ft) in Peru and reaches 3,700 m (12,100 ft) elsewhere. Subspecies A. h. dabbenei reaches 3,600 m (11,800 ft). A. h. brasilianus is mostly found from sea level to 750 m (2,500 ft) but locally reaches 2,200 m (7,200 ft) in Brazil.

== Behavior ==
=== Movement ===
Hellmayr's pipit is a partial migrant. The nominate subspecies and A. h. brasilianus are year-round residents. Subspecies A. h. dabbenei vacates the area south from Argentina's Neuquén Province and adjoining Chile during the austral winter, moving north as far as Córdoba and Entre Ríos provinces in north-central Argentina. (Note that the map does not show this winter range.)

=== Feeding ===
The diet of Hellmayr's pipit has not been studied but is known to include larval and adult insects. It forages on the ground while walking or running.

=== Breeding ===
The breeding season of Hellmayr's pipit varies geographically. In Brazil it spans at least September to April. In Bolivia it includes November to January, in Argentina September to February, and in Chile from September to January. Males make a flight display that can reach 60 m (200 ft) above the ground with a spiral descent to the ground. At least in Argentina, both sexes build the nest. The nest is a domed cup made mostly of grass on the ground or attached to low vegetation. The clutch is three to five eggs that are grayish to creamy white with brown or olive-brown spots. In a study in Argentina incubation lasted 13 to 14 days and fledging occurred nine to 14 days after hatch. Both parents provision nestlings.

=== Vocalization ===
Hellmayr's pipit sings from a perch, such as a shrub or fence post, and during the display flight. In Brazil its song is a "very/extr. high, short, hurried twitter ending in a nasal drawn-out note, together as tritfitwitweét-trutfutwuit-srèèh, given in 2-3 sec intervals". A study in Chile's Arauco Province found its flight song there is "a relatively fast sequence of 3–7 short, complex, high-pitched notes interspersed with a short buzz that becomes longer at the end of the song". When perched it sings a shorter song with shorter buzzes and sometimes just "high-pitched complex warbling notes".

== Status ==
The IUCN has assessed Hellmayr's pipit as being of Least Concern. It has a very large range; its population size is not known and is believed to be stable. No immediate threats have been identified. It is "[l]ocally uncommon to frequent as a breeding species". However, its status in Argentina and Chile is not well understood. "Habitat fragmentation and land cover change are the main threats to this species."
