= Liolaemus escarchadosi =

Conservation status
- Least Concern (IUCN 3.1)

Scientific classification
- Kingdom: Animalia
- Phylum: Chordata
- Class: Reptilia
- Order: Squamata
- Suborder: Iguania
- Family: Liolaemidae
- Genus: Liolaemus
- Species: L. escarchadosi

Binomial name
- Liolaemus escarchadosi Scolaro, 1997

Species of lizard

Liolaemus escarchadosi is a species of lizard in the family Liolaemidae. It is native to Argentina and Chile.

== Etymology ==
The specific name, escarchadosi, refers to Los Escarchados, an area in Patagonia.

== Geographic range ==
L. escarchadosi is found in southern Santa Cruz Province, Argentina, and in a small area of adjacent southern Chile.

== Habitat ==
The preferred natural habitat of L. escarchadosi is grassland, at altitudes of 40–1,200 m (130–3,940 ft).

== Diet ==
L. escarchadosi preys upon beetles.

== Reproduction ==
L. escarchadosi is ovoviviparous.

== Taxonomy ==
L. escarchadosi belongs to the L. kingii species group.
