= Atelognathus solitarius =

Conservation status
- Data Deficient (IUCN 3.1)

Scientific classification
- Kingdom: Animalia
- Phylum: Chordata
- Class: Amphibia
- Order: Anura
- Family: Batrachylidae
- Genus: Atelognathus
- Species: A. solitarius

Binomial name
- Atelognathus solitarius (Cei, 1970)

Species of frog

Atelognathus solitarius is a species of frog in the family Batrachylidae. It is endemic to Argentina.

This frog lives near creeks in rocky ravines near in volcanic wasteland. Scientists observed this frog 900 meters above sea level in Las Bayas Creek, which is in Rio Negro Province.

Scientists presume this frog breeds through larval development like its congeners but have not observed its breeding habits.

This frog is classified as data deficient, and scientists have not confirmed any principal threats. Sheep graze in the frog's habitat, but scientists are not certain whether this affects the frog significantly.
