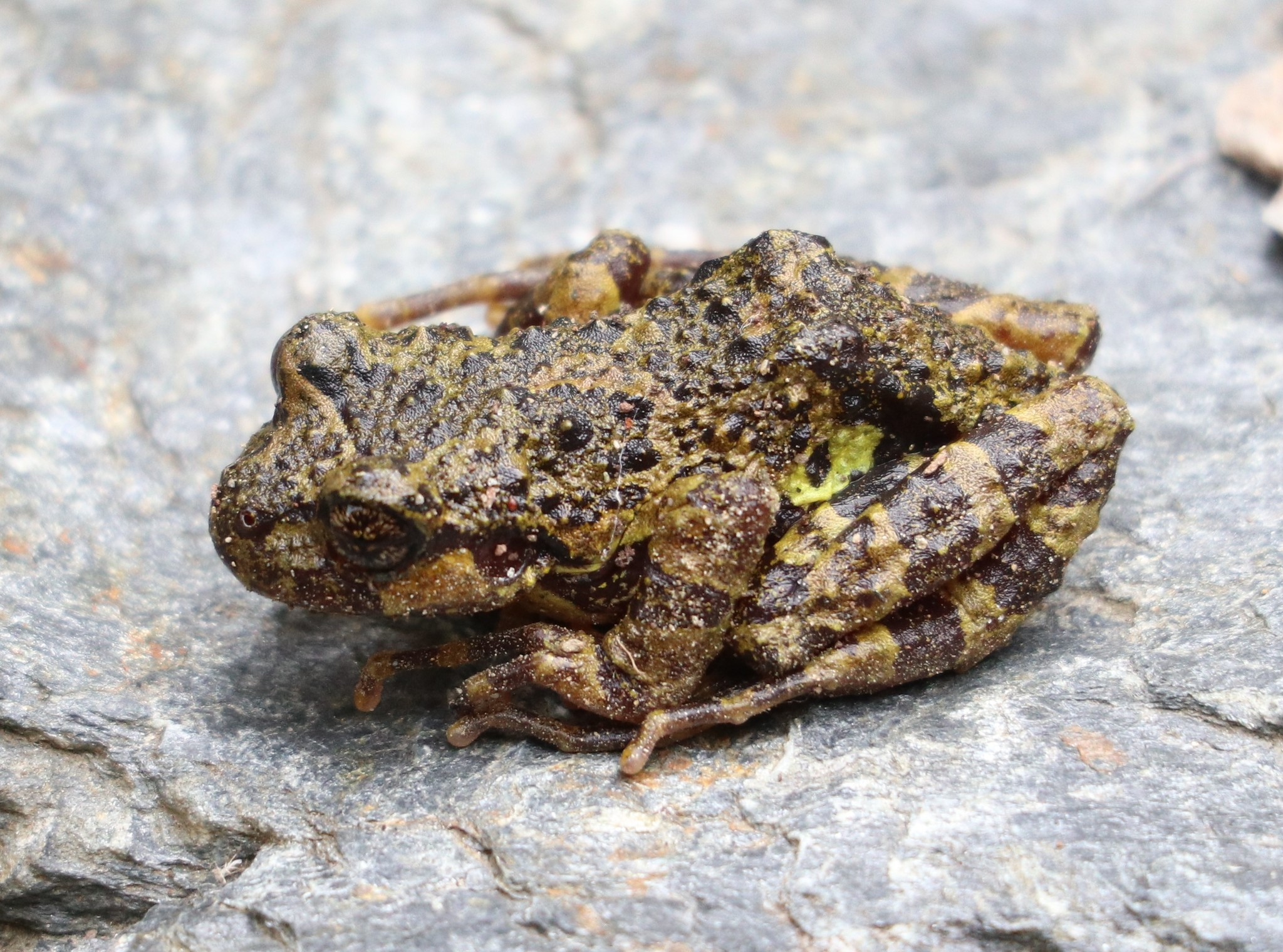

Conservation status
- Least Concern (IUCN 3.1)

Scientific classification
- Kingdom: Animalia
- Phylum: Chordata
- Class: Amphibia
- Order: Anura
- Family: Batrachylidae
- Genus: Batrachyla
- Species: B. antartandica

Binomial name
- Batrachyla antartandica Barrio, 1967

= Batrachyla antartandica =

Species of frog

Batrachyla antartandica is a species of frog in the family Batrachylidae. It is found in Argentina and Chile.

== Home ==
This frog can live in cold humid forests, rainforests, in bogs and other wetlands in forests, near ponds, and near lakes with swamps nearby. Adults have been observed climbing Nothofagus trees. They have been observed in gardens and pastures.

Scientists have seen the frog in more than ten protected parks.

== Reproduction ==
The female lays eggs on the ground under logs or moss. Subsequent rainfall floods the area, and the tadpoles develop in this water. Parental care has been observed.

== Threats ==
Scientists from the IUCN say this frog is not in danger of dying out. The principal threats are habitat loss in the form of deforestation.
