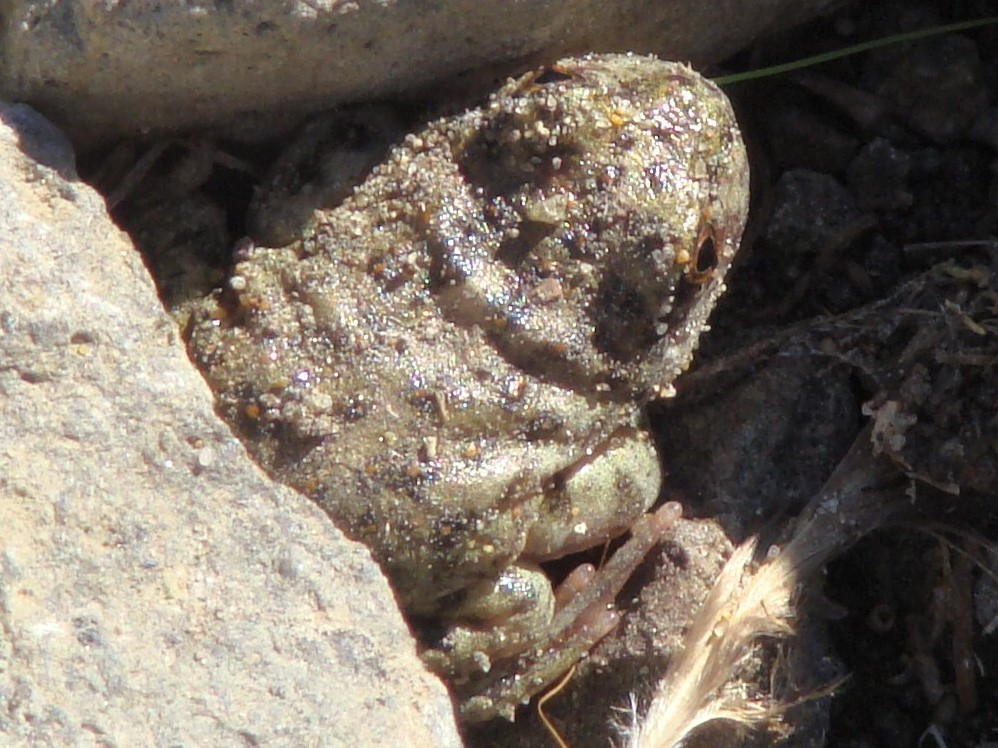

Conservation status
- Vulnerable (IUCN 3.1)

Scientific classification
- Kingdom: Animalia
- Phylum: Chordata
- Class: Amphibia
- Order: Anura
- Family: Batrachylidae
- Genus: Atelognathus
- Species: A. reverberii

Binomial name
- Atelognathus reverberii (Cei, 1969)

= Atelognathus reverberii =

Species of frog

Atelognathus reverberii is a species of frog in the family Batrachylidae. It is endemic to Argentina.

== Habitat ==
This frog has been found on high steppes and tablelands with bodies of water. Although it is largely terrestrial having been found 100 m away from the water, it does spend significant time there as well. Scientists saw this frog between 920 and 1200 meters above sea level.

Scientists have seen this frog inside a protected park, Somuncurá Provincial Reserve.

== Reproduction ==
This frog breeds in permanent bodies of water.

== Threats ==
The IUCN classifies this frog as vulnerable to extinction. People dig pits near bodies of water to collect water for human use. The frogs enter the pits to breed and die there. People also allow livestock to drink from the bodies of water where the frogs live, to eat aquatic vegetation, and to trample the area. Climate change poses another threat in that it causes bodies of water to dry up.

Scientists have detected the fungus Batrachochytrium dendrobatidis on the frog, so they think the disease chytridiomycosis might kill this frog, but the extent of this has not been confirmed.
