= Atelognathus praebasalticus =

Conservation status
- Endangered (IUCN 3.1)

Scientific classification
- Kingdom: Animalia
- Phylum: Chordata
- Class: Amphibia
- Order: Anura
- Family: Batrachylidae
- Genus: Atelognathus
- Species: A. praebasalticus

Binomial name
- Atelognathus praebasalticus (Cei & Roig, 1968)

Synonyms
- Telmatobius praebasalticus Cei and Roig, 1968; Alsodes praebasalticus Gallardo, 1970; Telmatobius praebasalticus Barrio, 1970; Telmatobius praebasalticus praebasalticus Cei, 1972; Telmatobius praebasalticus agilis Cei, 1972; Telmatobius praebasalticus luisi Cei, 1972; Telmatobius praebasalticus dobeslawi Cei, 1972; Atelognathus praebasalticus Lynch, 1978, Atelognathus praebasalticus agilis Cei, 1987; Atelognathus praebasalticus dobeslawi Cei, 1987; Atelognathus praebasalticus luisi Cei, 1987

Species of frog

Atelognathus praebasalticus is a species of frog in the family Batrachylidae. It is endemic to Argentina.

== Habitat ==
This frog lives under rocks near streams and in humid ravines near lagoons, in steppes, and semi-desert. This frog needs bodies of water with rocky bottoms and considerable underwater vegetation. Scientists observed this frog between 1000 and 1500 meters above sea level.

== Reproduction ==
Scientists believe that this frog breeds by larval development and that the tadpoles swim in lagoons.

== Conservation and threats ==
The IUCN classifies this species as endangered. Invasive fish prey upon this frog and its tadpoles. People also allow sheep and other livestock to graze on the water plants that make the frog's habitat viable.
