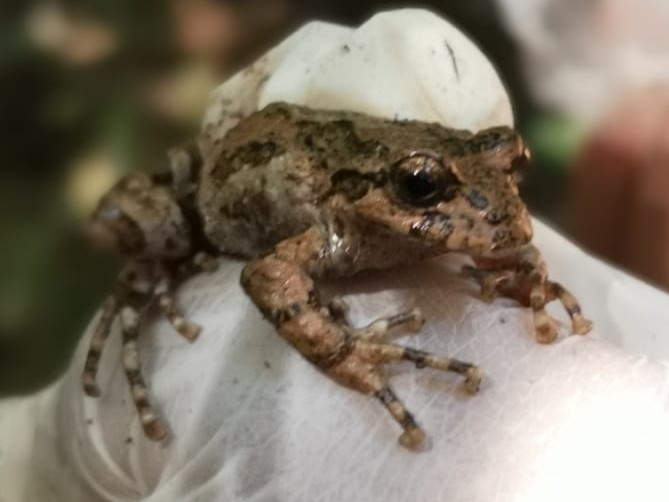

Conservation status
- Least Concern (IUCN 3.1)

Scientific classification
- Kingdom: Animalia
- Phylum: Chordata
- Class: Amphibia
- Order: Anura
- Family: Batrachylidae
- Genus: Batrachyla
- Species: B. leptopus

Binomial name
- Batrachyla leptopus Bell, 1843

Synonyms
- Hylodes brevipes Philippi, 1902; Hylodes cardioglossa Philippi, 1902; Hylodes chonotica Philippi, 1902; Hylodes fitzingeri Philippi, 1902; Hylodes gracilis Philippi, 1902; Hylodes granulatus Philippi, 1902; Hylodes stenocephala Philippi, 1902

= Batrachyla leptopus =

Species of frog

Batrachyla leptopus is a species of frog in the family Batrachylidae. It is found in Argentina and Chile.

== Habitat ==
This frog lives in forests, such as Nothofagus forests, swamps, bogs, and near ponds and lakes. Scientists saw this frog between 50 and 1100 meters above sea level.

Scientists have seen the frog in many protected parks.

== Reproduction ==
The female frog lays eggs under logs or on moss. Subsequent rainfall floods these areas, and the tadpoles swim and develop in these bodies of water. Parental care has been reported.

== Threats ==
The IUCN classifies this frog as least concern of extinction. What threats exist include cattle grazing and the conversion of wild forest to sylviculture, but the frogs have been found on some tree plantations, so scientists suspect some tolerance to habitat disruption.
