= Liolaemus gallardoi =

Conservation status
- Least Concern (IUCN 3.1)

Scientific classification
- Kingdom: Animalia
- Phylum: Chordata
- Order: Squamata
- Suborder: Iguania
- Family: Liolaemidae
- Genus: Liolaemus
- Species: L. gallardoi

Binomial name
- Liolaemus gallardoi Cei & Scolaro, 1982

Synonyms
- Liolaemus archeforus gallardoi Cei & Scolaro, 1982; Liolaemus gallardoi — Cei & Scolaro, 1996

Species of lizard

Liolaemus gallardoi is a species of lizard in the family Liolaemidae. The species is endemic to Argentina.

== Etymology ==
The specific name, gallardoi, is in honor of Argentinian herpetologist José María Alfonso Félix Gallardo.

== Geographic range ==
L. gallardoi is found in Santa Cruz Province, Argentina, in the vicinity of Belgrano Lake.

== Habitat ==
The preferred natural habitat of L. gallardoi is shrubland, at altitudes of 1,000–1,300 m (3,300–4,300 ft).

== Diet ==
L. gallardoi preys upon insects.

== Reproduction ==
L. gallardoi is viviparous (ovoviviparous).

== Taxonomy ==
L. gallardoi belongs to the L. kingii species group.
