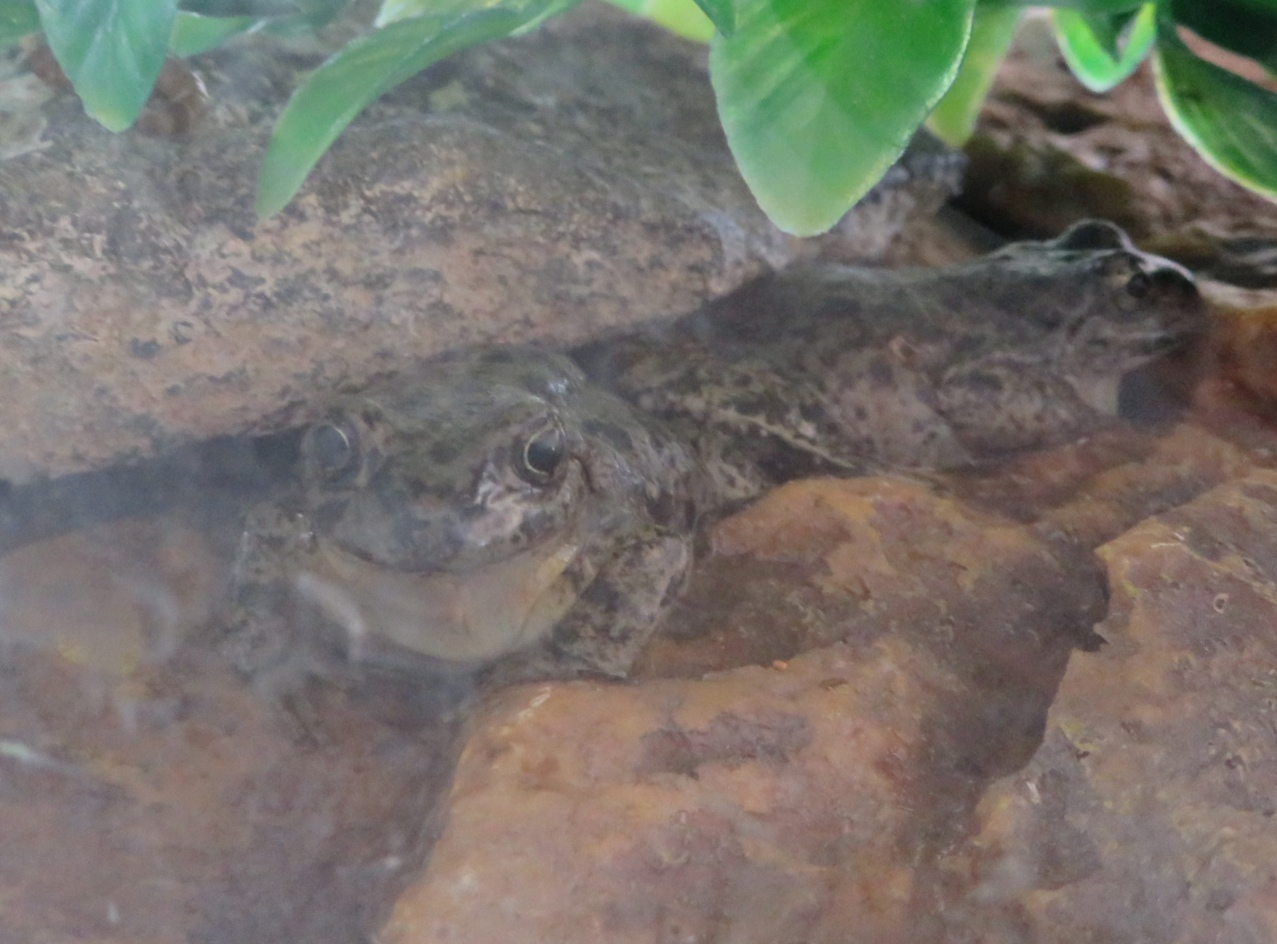
- Atelognathus patagonicus in Neuquén, Argentina

Conservation status
- Critically Endangered (IUCN 3.1)

Scientific classification
- Kingdom: Animalia
- Phylum: Chordata
- Class: Amphibia
- Order: Anura
- Family: Batrachylidae
- Genus: Atelognathus
- Species: A. patagonicus

Binomial name
- Atelognathus patagonicus (Gallardo, 1962)

Synonyms
- Batrachophrynus patagonicus Gallardo, 1962; Telmatobius patagonicus (Gallardo, 1962)

= Atelognathus patagonicus =

Species of frog

Atelognathus patagonicus is a species of frog in the family Batrachylidae. It is endemic to the volcanic tablelands of Neuquén Province, western Argentina. Its common name is Patagonia frog.

== Description ==
The adult measures about 50 mm in snout-vent length. The skin of the dorsum is brown or green in color with dark spots. This frog has two body types, and individuals can transition between the two during their lives. Frogs with the aquatic body type spend a great deal of time in the water. They have more folds in their skin and more webbed skin between their toes. Their bellies are also notably orange in color. Frogs with the littoral or terrestrial body type spend time more land. They have less excess skin and gray bellies.

The frogs tend to have the aquatic body type if they have access to a year-round or permanent lagoon. They become littoral if they have access to only temporary bodies of water (which dry up for at least part of the year). Scientists believe this is related to the foods they eat in these two different lifestyles.

== Diet ==
The adult frogs eat invertebrates. The amphipods in pools of water have carotenoids in their bodies. This may be the cause of the yellow ventral areas of aquatic frogs. Littoral frogs eat insects and arachnids that they find on land.

== Reproduction ==
The tadpoles' bodies and tails are gold-brown in color with brown spots. The caudal fin is clear. The tadpoles swim in shallow water and eat tiny animals and algae. Some of them undergo metamorphosis relatively soon, but others overwinter as tadpoles and undergo metamorphosis in the spring. This appears to depend on whether they live in a permanent or temporary body of water.

== Habitat ==
Its natural habitats are permanent lagoons surrounded by steppe and/or semidesert. They are mostly aquatic but can also be found in the vegetation surrounding the lagoons. Breeding takes place in water.

== Threats ==
The population in the Laguna Blanca (in the Laguna Blanca National Park), which used to be the main subpopulation, has been extirpated by introduced by fish (perch and salmonids). However, other subpopulations, located within the buffer zone of the Laguna Blanca National Park, occur in isolated ponds and mostly appear to be stable. However, eutrophication is a problem in some ponds, and introductions of predatory fish pose a risk to all remaining subpopulations. Also diseases are a risk. Scientists have found ranavirus and ranavirus and the fungus Batrachochytrium dendrobatidis on dead and sick frogs.
