= Liolaemus eleodori =

Conservation status
- Least Concern (IUCN 3.1)

Scientific classification
- Kingdom: Animalia
- Phylum: Chordata
- Class: Reptilia
- Order: Squamata
- Suborder: Iguania
- Family: Liolaemidae
- Genus: Liolaemus
- Species: L. eleodori

Binomial name
- Liolaemus eleodori Cei, Etheridge & Videla, 1985

Species of lizard

Liolaemus eleodori, commonly known as Eleodor's tree iguana, is a species of lizard in the family Liolaemidae. The species is native to Argentina.

== Etymology ==
The specific name, eleodori, is in honor of Eleodoro Sánchez, an employee of the Fauna Division of the government of San Juan Province, Argentina, for his support of field research.

== Geographic range ==
L. eleodori is found in San Juan Province, Argentina.

== Habitat ==
The preferred natural habitat of L. eleodiri is grassland, at an altitude of 3,500 m (11,500 ft).

== Reproduction ==
The mode of reproduction of L. eleodori has been described as viviparous and as ovoviviparous.
