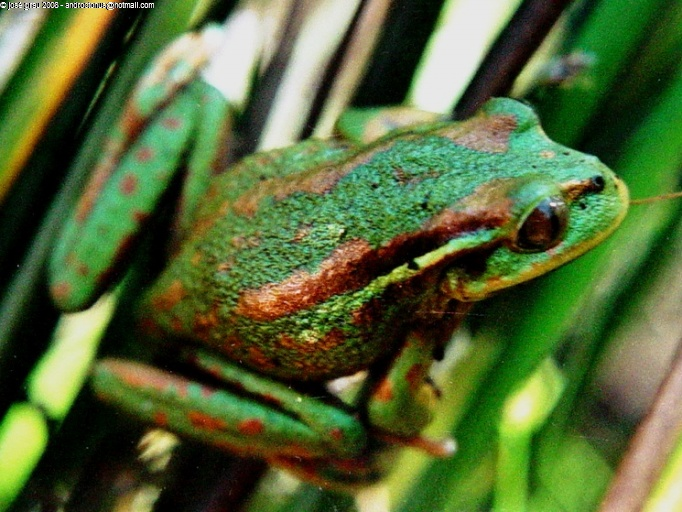

Conservation status
- Least Concern (IUCN 3.1)

Scientific classification
- Kingdom: Animalia
- Phylum: Chordata
- Class: Amphibia
- Order: Anura
- Family: Batrachylidae
- Genus: Hylorina; Bell, 1843
- Species: H. sylvatica

Binomial name
- Hylorina sylvatica Bell, 1843

Synonyms
- Cystignathus aeneus Guichenot, 1848; Hylorina andina Philippi, 1902; Hylorina longipes Philippi, 1902

= Hylorina sylvatica =

Species of frog

Hylorina sylvatica (also known as the Emerald forest frog, or in Spanish, sapo arboreo) is a species of frog in the family Batrachylidae. It is monotypic within the genus Hylorina. It is found in Argentina and Chile. This species is endemic to the austral Nothofagus forests of Chile and Argentina with a narrow distribution along the eastern slopes of the Andes.

== Description ==
Male Hylorina sylvatica grow to snout-vent length of 53–56 mm (2.1–2.2 in) and females to 60–66 mm (2.4–2.6 in). They are emerald-green during the day while they turn dark green at night. Adults can be found in permanent and temporary pools, swamps, and marshes.

== Reproduction ==
This species requires wetlands surrounded by vegetation to breed. The female lays eggs in pools and bonds. Larvae are aquatic and found in pools and ponds. Because this species spends a long time as a tadpoles, including overwintering, it requires bodies of water that remain present year round. The tadpoles are light brown in color on top and darker brown underneath. There is a circular mark around the nostrils and a rhomboid mark between the eyes.

== Conservation status ==
While Hylorina sylvatica is uncommon and threatened by habitat loss (due to, e.g., logging), IUCN classifies it as of "Least Concern" in view of its wide distribution, presumed large population, and slow rate of decline. Habitatl loss in favor of wood collection and pine tree plantations are the principal threat, and introduced salmonid fish are another.
