= Laguna Blanca National Park =

National park in Argentina

- Parque Nacional Laguna Blanca
- IUCN category II (national park)
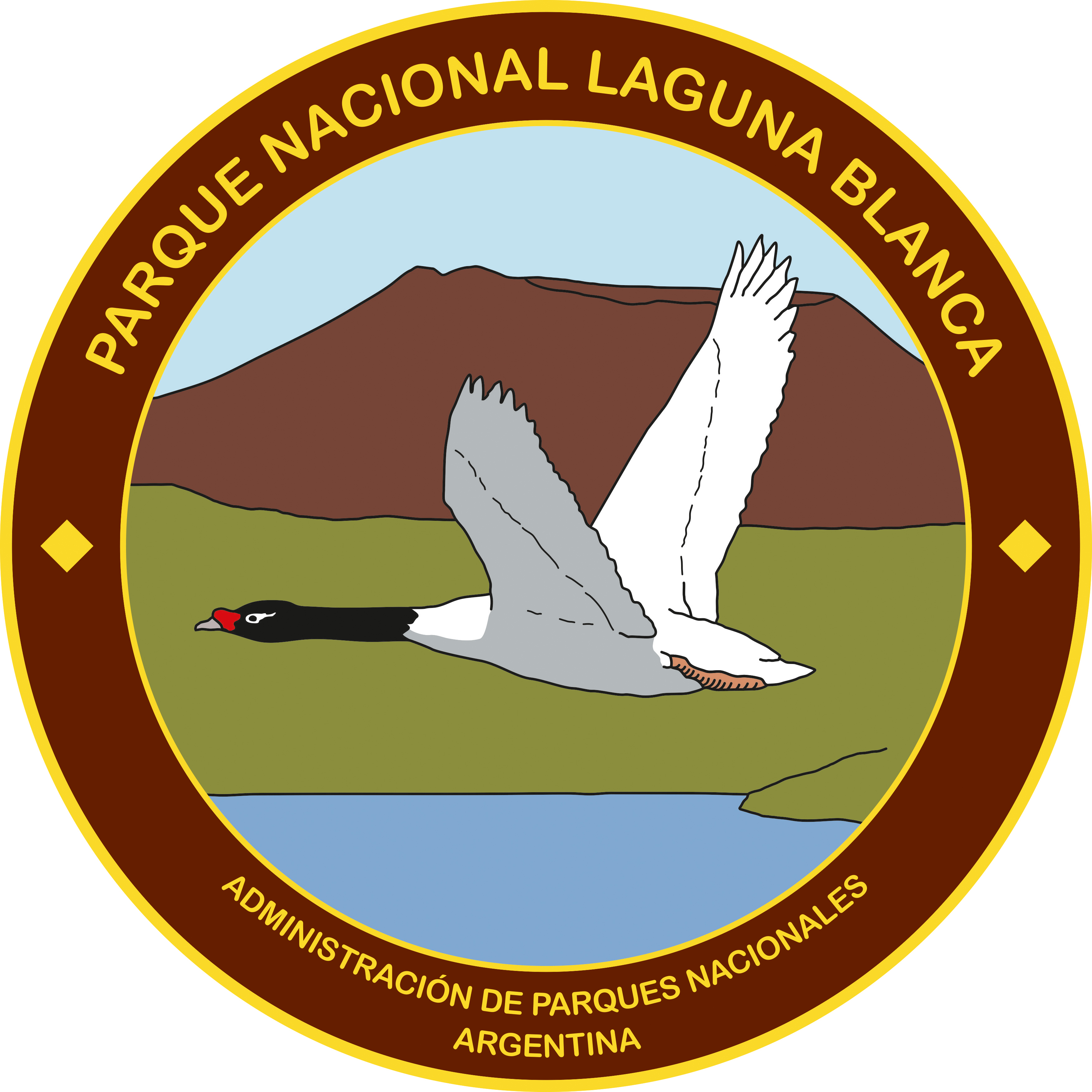
- Emblem of the Laguna Blanca National Park

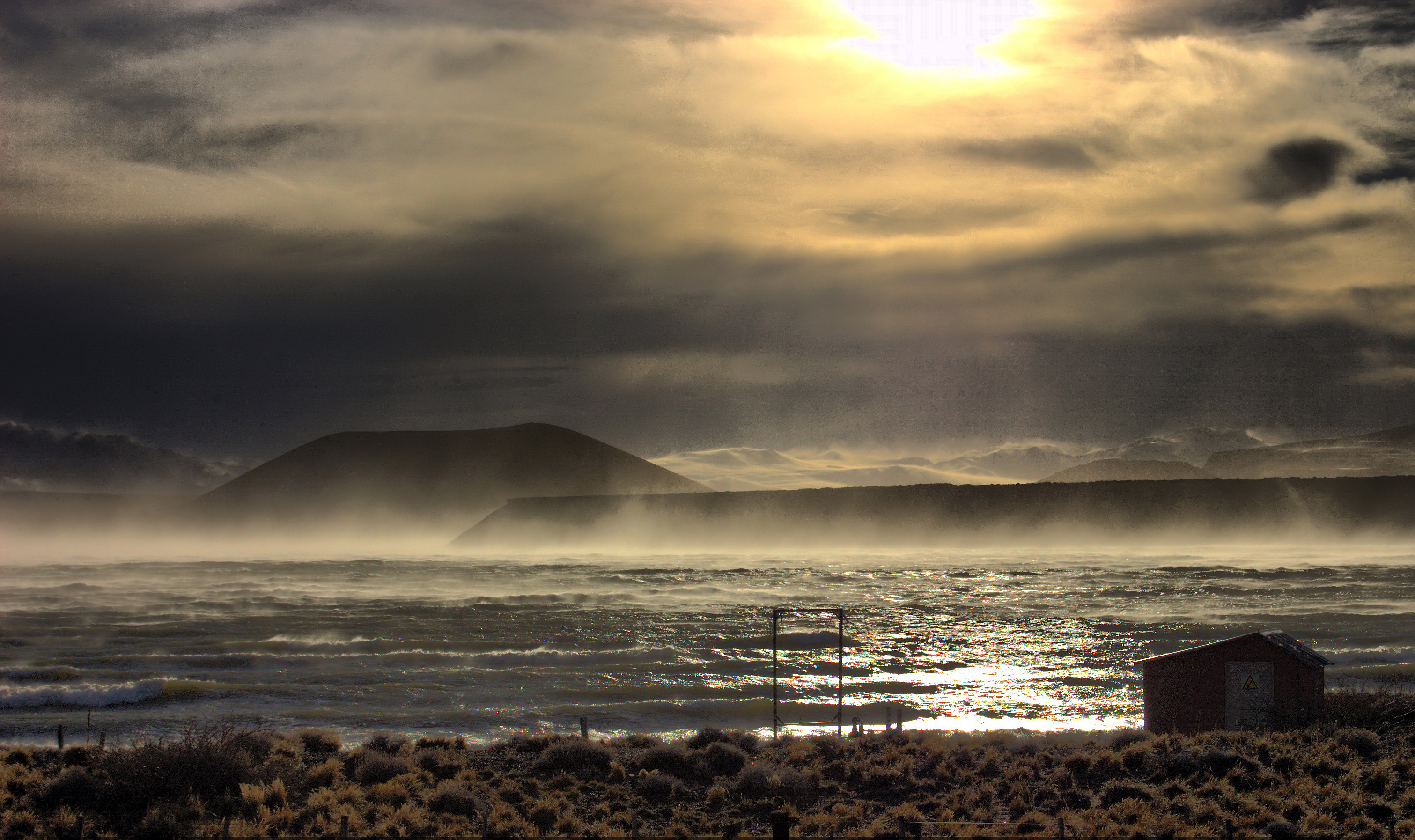
- The Blanca lagoon with fog

- Location within Argentina
- Location: Neuquén Province, Argentina
- Coordinates: 39°02′S 70°24′W
- Area: 112.5 km^{2} (43.4 sq mi)
- Established: 1940

Ramsar Wetland
- Official name: Laguna Blanca
- Designated: 4 May 1992
- Reference no.: 556

Laguna Blanca National Park (Spanish: Parque Nacional Laguna Blanca) is a National Park in the west of the province of Neuquén, Argentina, close to the town of Zapala.

The park around the lagoon was created in 1940 to protect the lagoon and particularly the population of black-necked swans (Cygnus melancoryphus). It has an area of 112.5 km². The lagoon is situated in the Patagonian steppe, surrounded by hills and gorges.

It has important aquatic bird fauna, of several species and in great number.

The lagoon used to host the largest known subpopulation of the endemic Patagonia frog (Atelognathus patagonicus), but this has been extirpated by introduced predatory fish; the species survives in isolated ponds in the buffer zone of the national park.

Near the lagoon is the Salamanca cave, historically inhabited by humans, where rock paintings, typical of northern Patagonia, can be seen. Other mapuche and prehistoric human artifacts have been found in the park.

== Climate ==
Map of Laguna Blanca in Neuquén.

The park has an arid and windy climate with a large diurnal range. During summer, the mean temperature is 22 °C (71.6 °F) with temperatures that can exceed 40 °C (104.0 °F) during heat waves. In winter, the mean temperature is 5 °C (41.0 °F) with minimum temperatures reaching −20 °C (−4.0 °F). Snowfall can occur during the winter months. Rainfall is low, averaging between 150 and 200 mm (5.9 and 7.9 in) per year, most of it concentrated in winter.
