= Liolaemus rabinoi =

Conservation status
- Critically Endangered (IUCN 3.1)

Scientific classification
- Kingdom: Animalia
- Phylum: Chordata
- Class: Reptilia
- Order: Squamata
- Suborder: Iguania
- Family: Liolaemidae
- Genus: Liolaemus
- Species: L. rabinoi

Binomial name
- Liolaemus rabinoi (Cei, 1974)

Synonyms
- Ctenoblepharis rabinoi Cei, 1974; Liolaemus rabinoi — Cei, 1978; Liolaemus (Ortholaemus) rabinoi — Laurent, 1984

Species of lizard

Liolaemus rabinoi, commonly known as Rabino's tree iguana, is a species of lizard in the family Liolaemidae. The species is endemic to Argentina.

== Etymology ==
Both the specific name, rabinoi, and the common name, Rabino's tree iguana, are in honor of "M. Rabino" who was the collector of the holotype.
