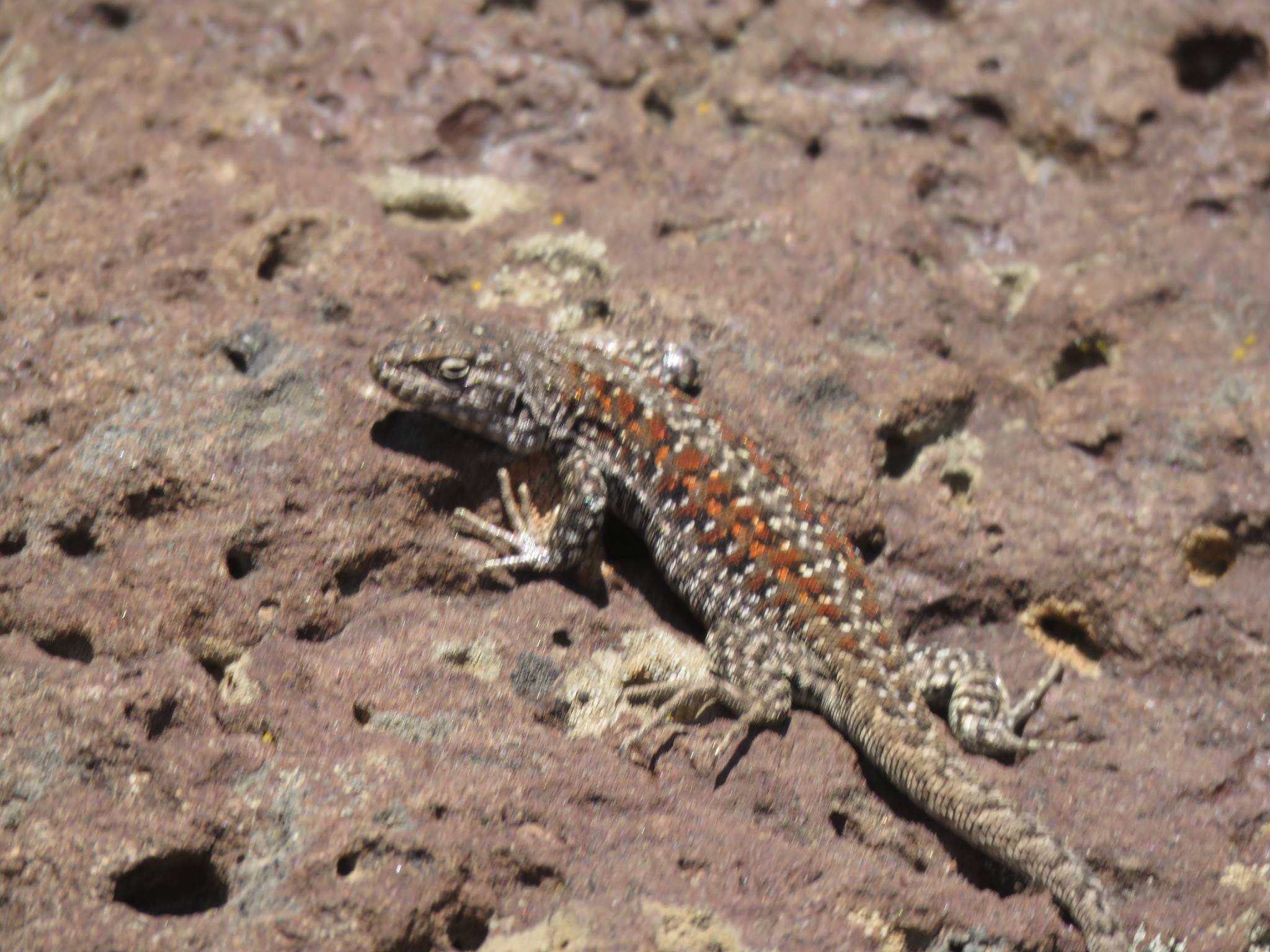

Conservation status
- Least Concern (IUCN 3.1)

Scientific classification
- Kingdom: Animalia
- Phylum: Chordata
- Class: Reptilia
- Order: Squamata
- Suborder: Iguania
- Family: Liolaemidae
- Genus: Liolaemus
- Species: L. archeforus

Binomial name
- Liolaemus archeforus Donoso-Barros & Cei, 1971

= Liolaemus archeforus =

Species of lizard

Liolaemus archeforus, the main tree iguana, is a species of lizard in the family Liolaemidae. It is native to Argentina.
