= Pleurodema somuncurense =

Conservation status
- Critically Endangered (IUCN 3.1)

Scientific classification
- Kingdom: Animalia
- Phylum: Chordata
- Class: Amphibia
- Order: Anura
- Family: Leptodactylidae
- Genus: Pleurodema
- Species: P. somuncurense

Binomial name
- Pleurodema somuncurense (Cei, 1969)

Synonyms
- Telmatobius somuncurensis Cei, 1969; Somuncuria somuncurensis (Cei, 1969)

Species of amphibian

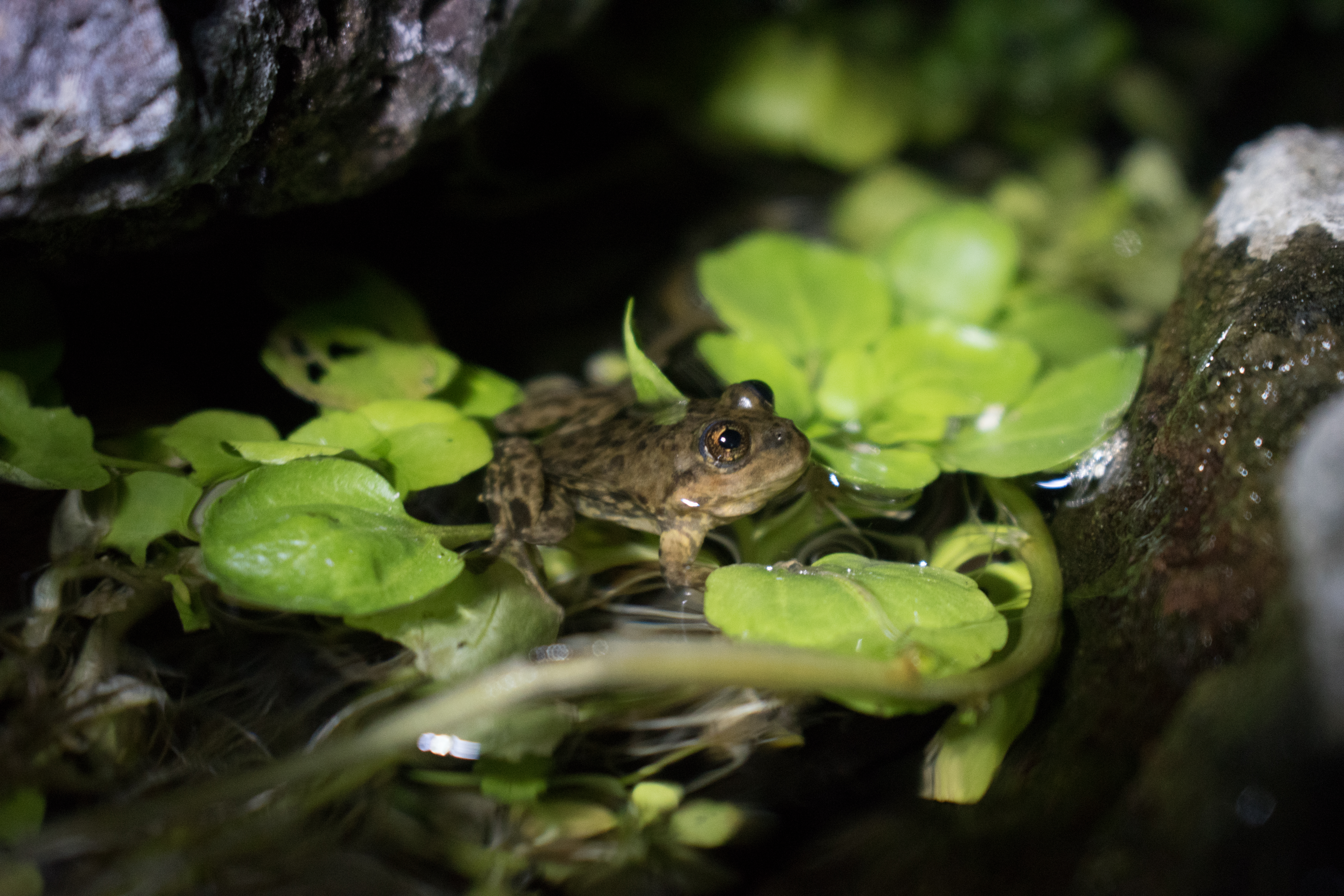
Pleurodema somuncurense in the Arroyo Valcheta, Patagonia, Argentina

Pleurodema somuncurense (the Somuncura frog or El Rincon stream frog, in Spanish rana de Somuncura) is a species of frog in the family Leptodactylidae. It is endemic to the Somuncura Plateau in Patagonia, Argentina.

== Description ==
Females range from 30 to 44 mm (1.2 to 1.7 in) in snout-vent length and males 28 to 35 mm (1.1 to 1.4 in). They are slender with fairly small head and large protruding, gold-coloured eyes. Fingers and toes are long and slender, with the toes being about one-third webbed. Eyes have two symmetrical rounded structures on the centre of the upper and lower border of the iris. The skin is smooth. Colouration is bright yellowish-brown on the upper surfaces of the head, body and legs. There are irregular dark spots across the back, and wavy dark reticulated lines on the sides of the body and backs of the thighs. There is a characteristic yellowish stripe that runs centrally down the top of the head and half of the back. The belly is purplish-yellow with dark grey reticulated spots. The lower surface of the thighs is purplish-rose and bears faint grey reticulated spots.

== Reproduction ==
Pleurodema somuncurense reproduces in the mid-spring and summer months through amplexus events, with males clasping on females from the back. P. somuncurense has specific features such as scramble competition and mating calls by males are typical of explosive breeders. Breeding microhabitats used by these species are under disturbance from livestock.

The female deposits her eggs in shallow, vegetation-rich water not far from thermal springs. The egg masses average 78 per clutch and appear as long, gelatinous strings with one end attached to plant root. The eggs are dark in color and take four days to hatch.

== Diet ==
The adult frogs feed primarily on arthropods, such as ants and wood lice. Although the frogs are mainly aquatic, only a few of their key prey animals live in the water. The frogs have been observed both seeking prey and lying in wait, sometimes concealed in vegetation.

The tadpoles feed primarily on plant matter and remove considerable dead and decaying material from their habitat. The skin of the dorsum is brown-gold in color and the skin of the ventrum is red-gray in color. The caudal fins are translucent with spots.

== Habitat and conservation ==
Pleurodema somuncurense is a fully aquatic frog that inhabits geothermal springs and streams. The microendemic species is restricted to the thermal headwaters of Valcheta Stream in Northern Patagonia, Argentina, entirely within the bounds of Somuncurá Provincial Reserve. Scientists have seen it between 500 and 800 m (1,600 and 2,600 ft) above sea level.

It is threatened by predation by introduced rainbow trout and by habitat loss from canalization of spring water. Livestock farming also has negative impacts through overgrazing and chemical pollution. The grassland fires used to promote regrowth of pasture for livestock impact the frog's availability of shelters, reproductive sites, and terrestrial prey. Scientists have detected the fungus Batrachochytrium dendrobatidis on these frogs, but it is not clear what effect chytridiomycosis has had on the population, and some scientists believe P. somuncurense may be resistant to the fungal illness.
