= Liolaemus duellmani =

Conservation status
- Data Deficient (IUCN 3.1)

Scientific classification
- Kingdom: Animalia
- Phylum: Chordata
- Class: Reptilia
- Order: Squamata
- Suborder: Iguania
- Family: Liolaemidae
- Genus: Liolaemus
- Species: L. duellmani

Binomial name
- Liolaemus duellmani Cei, 1978

Species of lizard

Liolaemus duellmani, commonly known as Duellman's tree iguana, is a species of lizard in the family Liolaemidae. The species is endemic to Argentina.

== Etymology ==
The specific name, duellmani, is in honor of American herpetologist William Edward Duellman.

== Geographic range ==
L. duellmani is found in Mendoza Province, Argentina.

== Habitat ==
The preferred natural habitat of L. duellmani is shrubland and grassland, at an altitude of 2,260 m (7,410 ft).

== Description ==
L. duellmani may attain a snout-to-vent length (SVL) of about 8 cm (3.1 in).

== Reproduction ==
L. duellmani is ovoviviparous.
