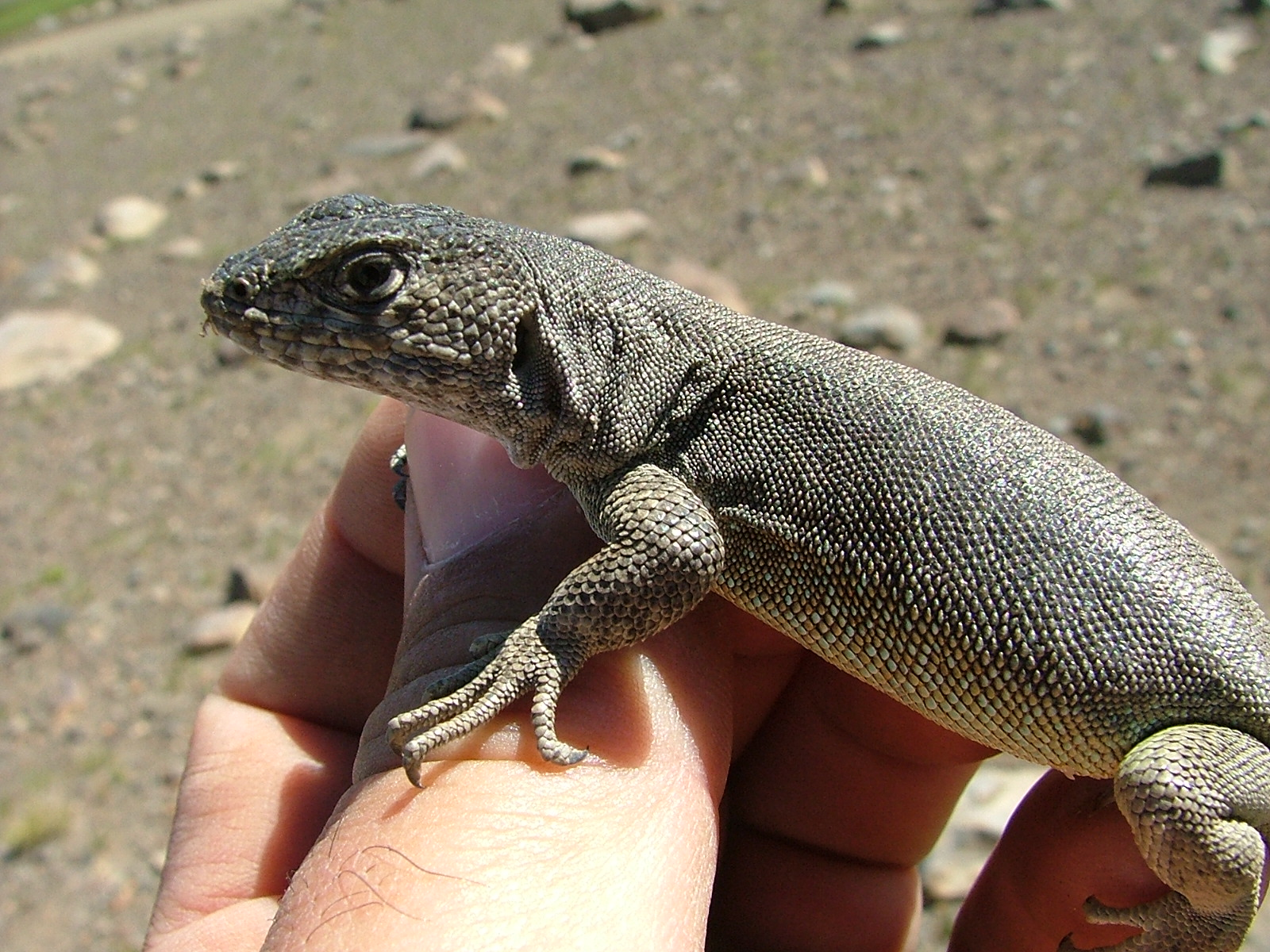

Conservation status
- Vulnerable (IUCN 3.1)

Scientific classification
- Kingdom: Animalia
- Phylum: Chordata
- Class: Reptilia
- Order: Squamata
- Suborder: Iguania
- Family: Liolaemidae
- Genus: Liolaemus
- Species: L. thermarum

Binomial name
- Liolaemus thermarum Videla & Cei, 1996

= Liolaemus thermarum =

Species of lizard

Liolaemus thermarum is a species of lizard in the family Liolaemidae. It is found in Argentina.
