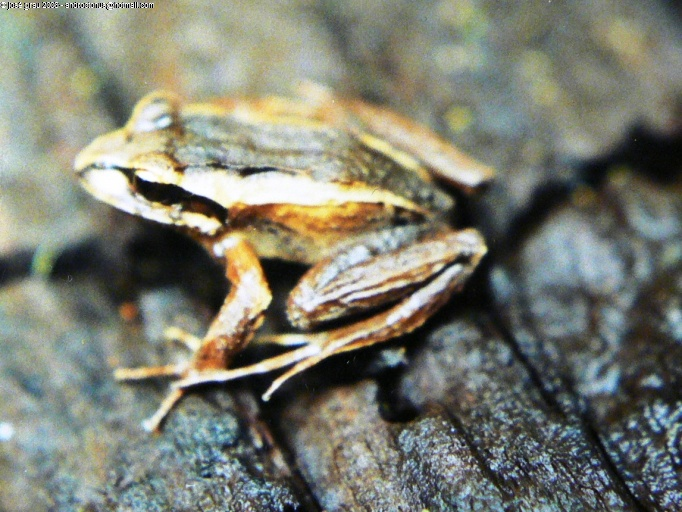
- B. taeniata

Scientific classification
- Kingdom: Animalia
- Phylum: Chordata
- Class: Amphibia
- Order: Anura
- Family: Batrachylidae
- Genus: Batrachyla; Bell, 1843

Type species
- Batrachyla leptopus Bell, 1843

Species
- 5, see text.

= Batrachyla =

Genus of amphibians

Batrachyla is a genus of frogs in the family Batrachylidae. Sometimes known as the South American wood frogs, these frogs are distributed in southern South America (Argentina and Chile).

== Species ==
There are five species in the genus:

- Batrachyla antartandica Barrio, 1967
- Batrachyla fitzroya Basso, 1994
- Batrachyla leptopus Bell, 1843
- Batrachyla nibaldoi Formas, 1997
- Batrachyla taeniata (Girard, 1855)
