= Liolaemus canqueli =

Conservation status
- Least Concern (IUCN 3.1)

Scientific classification
- Kingdom: Animalia
- Phylum: Chordata
- Class: Reptilia
- Order: Squamata
- Suborder: Iguania
- Family: Liolaemidae
- Genus: Liolaemus
- Species: L. canqueli

Binomial name
- Liolaemus canqueli Cei, 1975

Species of lizard

Liolaemus canqueli is a species of lizard in the family Liolaemidae. It is native to Argentina.
