= Liolaemus insolitus =

Conservation status
- Endangered (IUCN 3.1)

Scientific classification
- Kingdom: Animalia
- Phylum: Chordata
- Class: Reptilia
- Order: Squamata
- Suborder: Iguania
- Family: Liolaemidae
- Genus: Liolaemus
- Species: L. insolitus

Binomial name
- Liolaemus insolitus Cei, 1982

Species of lizard

Liolaemus insolitus is a species of lizard in the family Liolaemidae. It is native to Peru.
