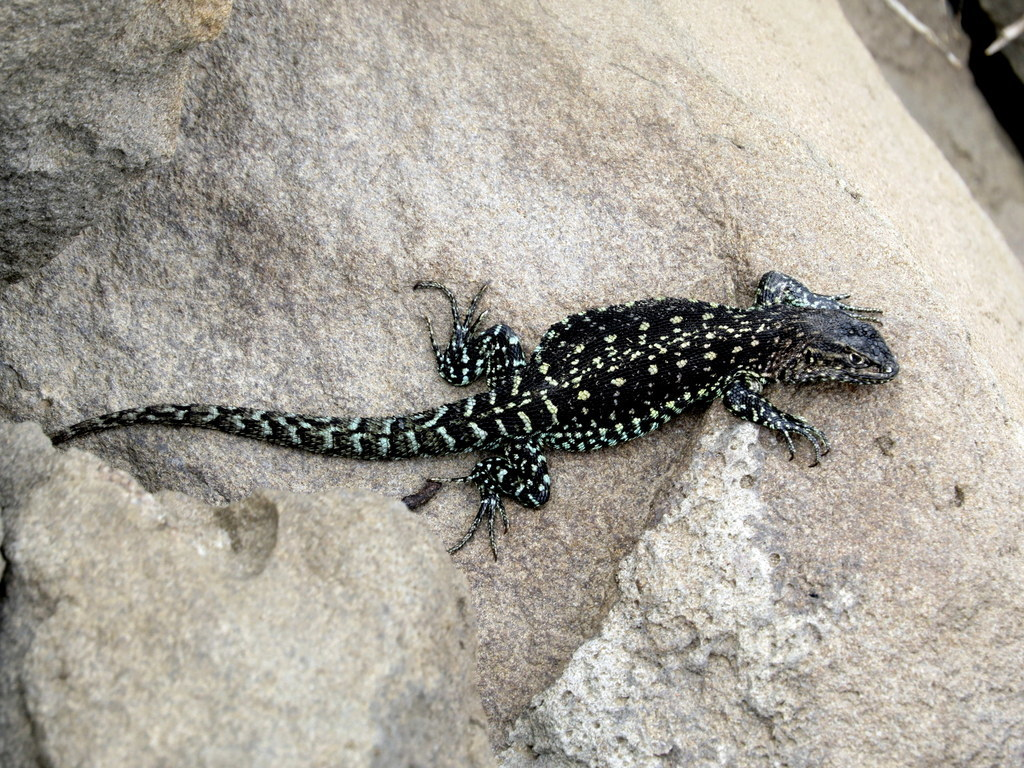

Conservation status
- Least Concern (IUCN 3.1)

Scientific classification
- Kingdom: Animalia
- Phylum: Chordata
- Class: Reptilia
- Order: Squamata
- Suborder: Iguania
- Family: Liolaemidae
- Genus: Liolaemus
- Species: L. baguali

Binomial name
- Liolaemus baguali Cei & Scolaro, 1983

= Liolaemus baguali =

Species of lizard

Liolaemus baguali is a species of lizard in the family Liolaemidae. It is native to Argentina.
