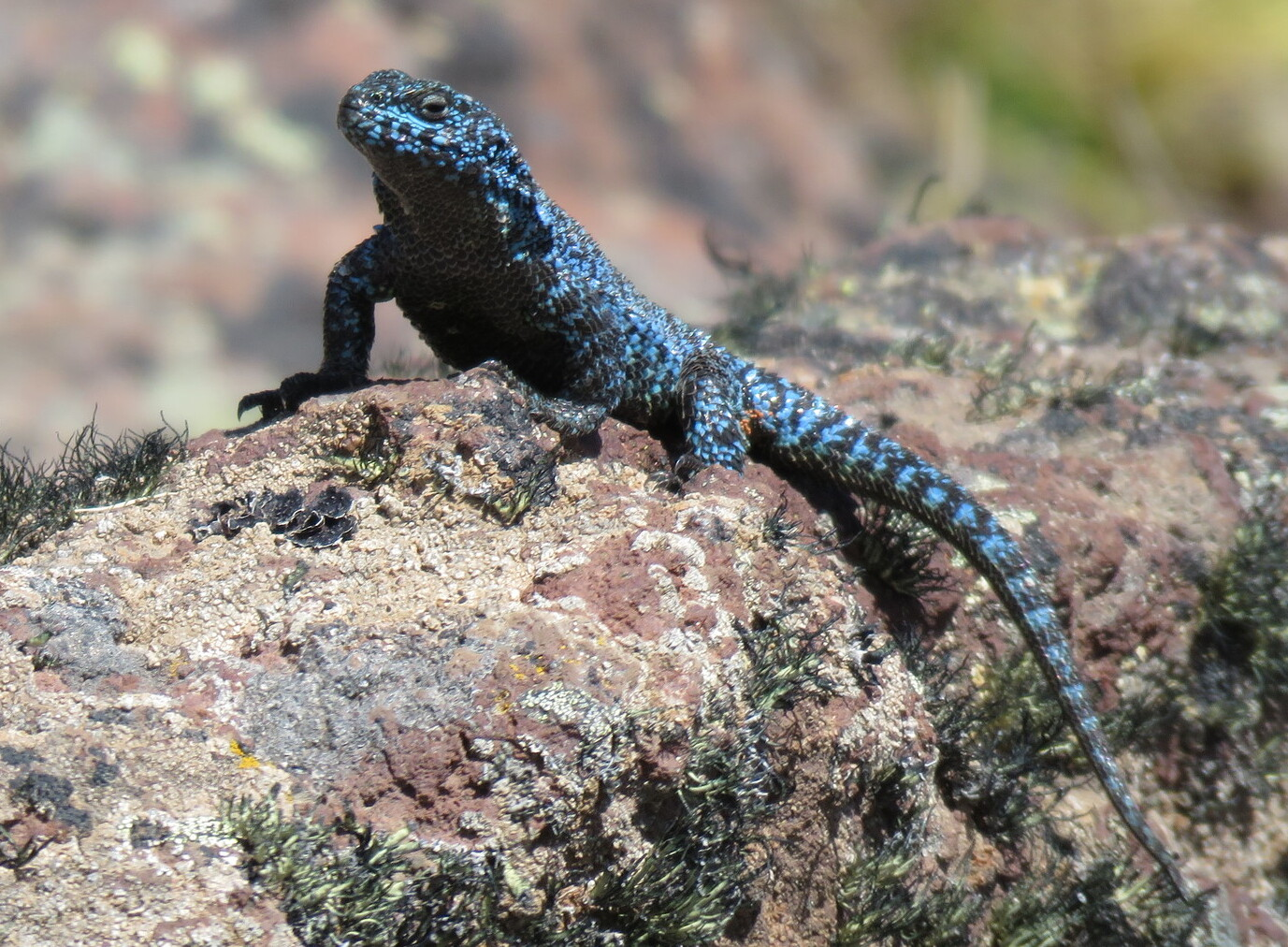

Conservation status
- Least Concern (IUCN 3.1)

Scientific classification
- Kingdom: Animalia
- Phylum: Chordata
- Order: Squamata
- Suborder: Iguania
- Family: Liolaemidae
- Genus: Liolaemus
- Species: L. silvanae

Binomial name
- Liolaemus silvanae (Donoso-Barros & Cei, 1971)

= Liolaemus silvanae =

Species of lizard

Liolaemus silvanae is a species of lizard in the family Liolaemidae. It is native to Argentina.
