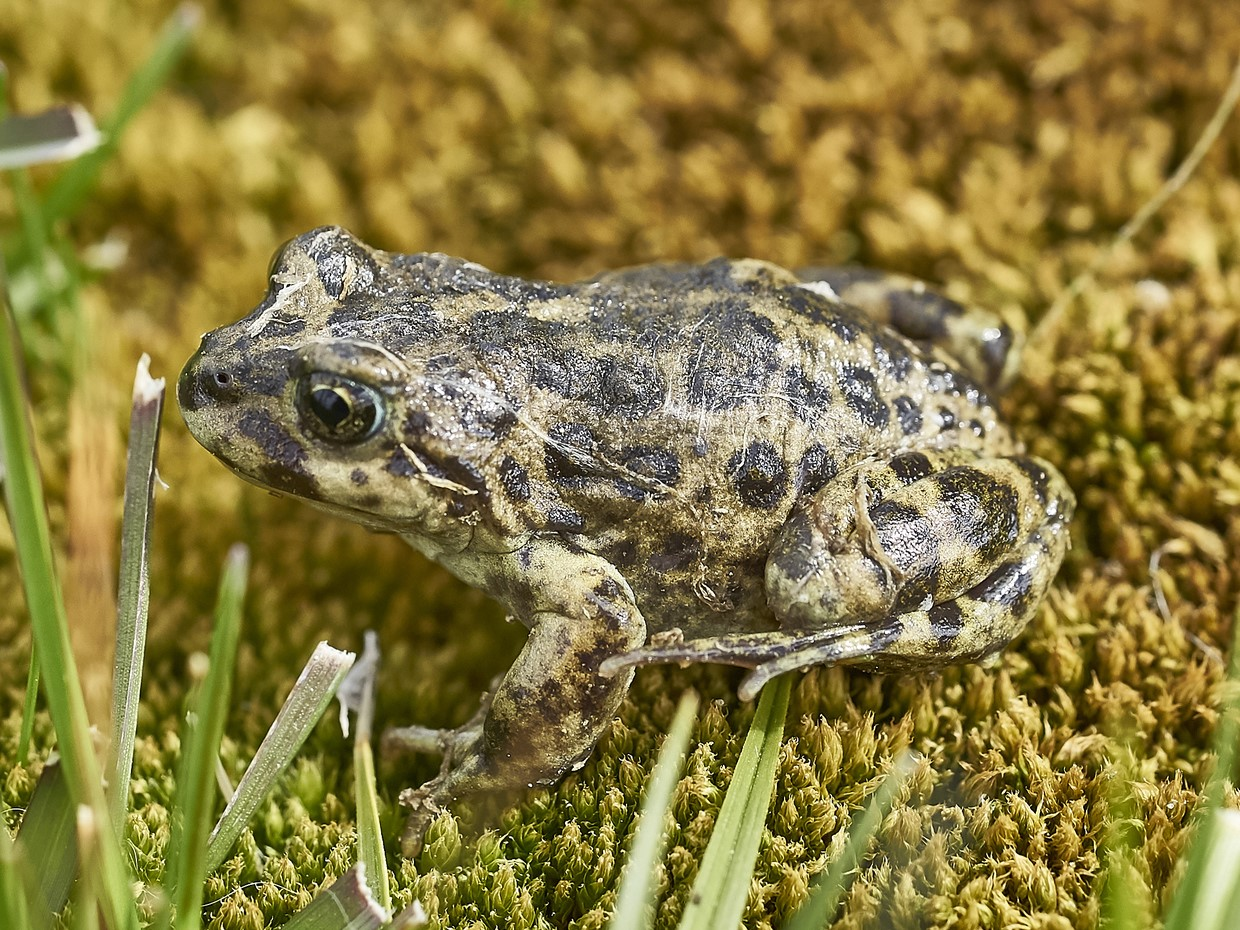

Conservation status
- Vulnerable (IUCN 3.1)

Scientific classification
- Kingdom: Animalia
- Phylum: Chordata
- Class: Amphibia
- Order: Anura
- Family: Batrachylidae
- Genus: Atelognathus
- Species: A. nitoi

Binomial name
- Atelognathus nitoi (Barrio, 1973)

Synonyms
- Telmatobius nitoi; Atelognathus ceii; Atelognathus jeinimenensis; Atelognathus salai

= Atelognathus nitoi =

Species of frog

The Portezuelo frog or Rio Negro frog (Atelognathus nitoi) is a species of frog in the family Batrachylidae. It is endemic to Chile and Argentina.

== Habitat ==
This frog lives in Nothofagus forests near temporary and permanent ponds and areas with high humidity. Scientists observed this frog between 1300 and 1550 meters above sea level.

The frog has been found in Parque Nacional Nahuel Huapi and in Laguna Verde National Park.

== Reproduction ==
The female frog lays 50 to 300 eggs at a time.

== Threats ==
The IUCN classifies this frog as vulnerable to extinction. Threats include fires, human-made and otherwise, tourism, and possibly horses and cows grazing near the ponds.
