= Chaltenobatrachus =

Conservation status
- Least Concern (IUCN 3.1)

Scientific classification
- Kingdom: Animalia
- Phylum: Chordata
- Class: Amphibia
- Order: Anura
- Family: Batrachylidae
- Genus: Chaltenobatrachus; Basso, Úbeda, Bunge, and Martinazzo, 2011
- Species: C. grandisonae

Binomial name
- Chaltenobatrachus grandisonae (Lynch, 1975)

Synonyms
- Telmatobius grandisonae Lynch, 1975; Atelognathus grandisonae (Lynch, 1975)

Genus of amphibians

Chaltenobatrachus is a monotypic genus of frogs in the family Batrachylidae. The sole species, Chaltenobatrachus grandisonae, used to be included Atelognathus, which is considered the sister taxon of Chaltenobatrachus.

C. grandisonae (common name: Puerto Eden frog) is endemic to Patagonia, including both Chile and Argentina. It inhabits rainforest and wetlands of the southern fjordlands and Andes in Patagonia. It is known from just few localities: its type locality, Puerto Eden, Wellington Island, Chile, and two mainland sites in Argentina.

== Description ==
Small to medium-sized frogs, C. grandisonae adults reach a snout–vent length of about 46 mm (1.8 in), with typical frog-like appearance and body proportions. Back of the body and limbs are rather uniformly bright green with brown to reddish warts. Tadpoles are up to 56 mm (2.2 in) in total length. The skin of the dorsum is bright green in color with brown or reddish warts. There are bands stripes on the dorsal surfaces of the hind legs. Juveniles have more warts, more patterning, and brighter colors than mature frogs. The undersides of the legs are brown and partly translucent. There is a dark brown band from the nose over the nostril to the tympanum. There is a dark patch under the eye reaching to the lip. The iris of the eye is orange in color with gold spots and a dark line under the pupil. The pupil of the eye is shaped like a rhombus.

== Reproduction ==
Females of this species lay their eggs in clusters attached to branches or stones under the water in still water, mostly temporary ponds. Each cluster has a few tens of eggs. Eggs are deposited in October (middle austral spring), and development to metamorphosis takes about 10–12 weeks, to December (early summer). In colder sites, development seems to take longer and tadpoles might overwinter. The tadpoles' skin is translucent, and their bodies are brown in color with gold spots. Their eyes are gold with black spots.
