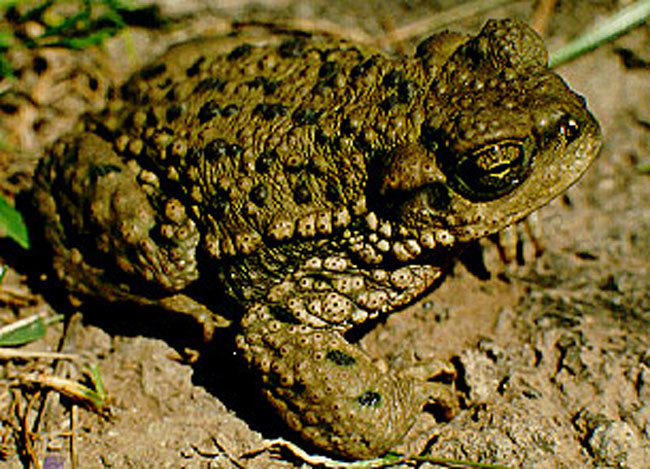

Conservation status
- Endangered (IUCN 3.1)

Scientific classification
- Kingdom: Animalia
- Phylum: Chordata
- Class: Amphibia
- Order: Anura
- Family: Bufonidae
- Genus: Rhinella
- Species: R. achalensis

Binomial name
- Rhinella achalensis (Cei, 1972)

Synonyms
- Bufo achalensis Cei, 1972; Chaunus achalensis (Cei, 1972)

= Rhinella achalensis =

Species of amphibian

Rhinella achalensis is a species of toad in the family Bufonidae that is endemic to northern Argentina (Córdoba and San Luis provinces).

Its natural habitats are rocky outcrops in montane grasslands where it reproduces in mountain streams. Juveniles and adults seem to avoid heavily grazed areas, using instead rocky outcrops that offer more protection.

Rhinella achalensis is threatened by cattle ranching and pollution of water by cattle.
