= Liolaemus somuncurae =

Conservation status
- Least Concern (IUCN 3.1)

Scientific classification
- Kingdom: Animalia
- Phylum: Chordata
- Class: Reptilia
- Order: Squamata
- Suborder: Iguania
- Family: Liolaemidae
- Genus: Liolaemus
- Species: L. somuncurae

Binomial name
- Liolaemus somuncurae Cei & Scolaro, 1981

Species of lizard

Liolaemus somuncurae is a species of lizard in the family Iguanidae or the family Liolaemidae. The species is endemic to Argentina.
