= Liolaemus coeruleus =

Conservation status
- Least Concern (IUCN 3.1)

Scientific classification
- Kingdom: Animalia
- Phylum: Chordata
- Class: Reptilia
- Order: Squamata
- Suborder: Iguania
- Family: Liolaemidae
- Genus: Liolaemus
- Species: L. coeruleus

Binomial name
- Liolaemus coeruleus Cei & Ortiz-Zapata, 1983

Species of lizard

Liolaemus coeruleus, the blue tree iguana, is a species of lizard in the family Liolaemidae. It is native to Argentina and Chile.
