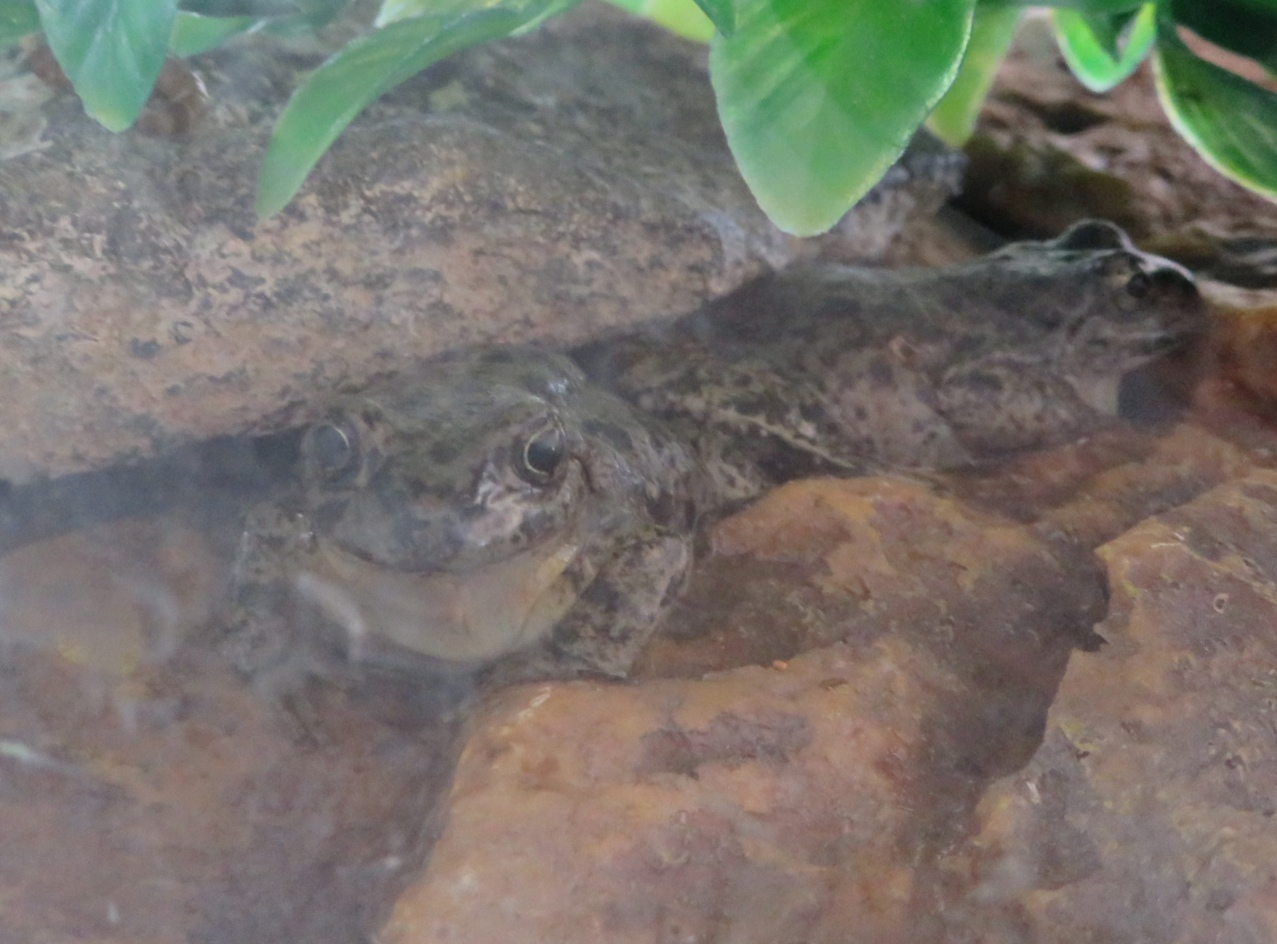
- Atelognathus patagonicus

Scientific classification
- Kingdom: Animalia
- Phylum: Chordata
- Class: Amphibia
- Order: Anura
- Family: Batrachylidae
- Genus: Atelognathus; Lynch, 1978

Type species
- Batrachophrynus patagonicus Gallardo, 1962

Species
- See text.

= Atelognathus =

Genus of amphibians

Atelognathus is a genus of frogs in the family Batrachylidae. Sometimes known as Patagonia frogs, these frogs are endemic to Patagonia (southernmost Argentina and Chile).

== Species ==
There are seven species in the genus:

- Atelognathus nitoi (Barrio, 1973)
- Atelognathus patagonicus (Gallardo, 1962)
- Atelognathus praebasalticus (Cei and Roig, 1968)
- Atelognathus reverberii (Cei, 1969)
- Atelognathus solitarius (Cei, 1970)

Formerly, Chaltenobatrachus grandisonae was also included in this genus (as Atelognathus grandisonae), before being moved to its own monotypic genus.
