= Somuncurá Provincial Reserve =

Protected area in Argentina

- Area Natural Protegida Provincial Meseta de Somuncurá
- Interactive map of Somuncurá Provincial Reserve
- Coordinates: 41°21′S 66°54′W

Somuncurá Provincial Reserve or Meseta de Somuncura Provincial Natural Protected Area (Area Natural Protegida Provincial Meseta de Somuncurá) is a provincial-level protected reserve in Argentina. Some resource extraction is permitted there, for example livestock cultivation and petroleum scouting.

== Geography ==
This park is on a high plateau in Río Negro Province and Chubut Province. It has volcanoes, volcanic plains, and large basalt steps, heavily eroded in some places. There are many lagoon lakes with underwater plants in them. Several streams run through the park: La Ventana, Los Berros, and El Verde. The Velcheta stream flows into the larger Rio Negro.

== Significance ==
This park is home to several endangered and threatened species, including the entire known remaining population of the El Rincon stream frog and most of the Atelognathus reverberii frogs and because of its many archaeological sites related to Argentina's indigenous people.

== Fauna ==
This park is home to endangered frogs and many other creatures. The Chilean flamingo also lives here. Scientists think other birds, for example the Patagonian tinamou may live here too.
