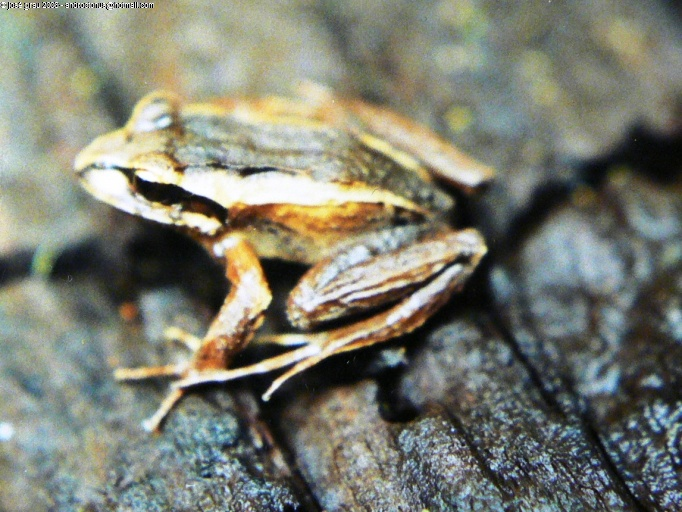

Conservation status
- Least Concern (IUCN 3.1)

Scientific classification
- Kingdom: Animalia
- Phylum: Chordata
- Class: Amphibia
- Order: Anura
- Family: Batrachylidae
- Genus: Batrachyla
- Species: B. taeniata

Binomial name
- Batrachyla taeniata (Girard, 1854)

Synonyms
- Alsodes bivittatus Philippi, 1902; Cystignathus hidalgoi Jiménez de la Espada, 1875; Dendrobates lateralis Guichenot, 1848; Litoria glandulosa Bell, 1843

= Batrachyla taeniata =

Species of frog

Batrachyla taeniata is a species of frog in the family Batrachylidae. It is found in Argentina and Chile.

== Habitat ==
This frog has been found in a variety of habitats including acacia steppe, rainforests, other forests, marshes, and cold areas. Scientists saw this frog between 0 and 1000 meters above sea level.

Scientists have seen the frog in many protected parks.

== Reproduction ==
The male frog sits under a bush and calls to the female frogs. The female frog lays eggs on the leaf litter in forests. Subsequent rainfall floods the area and the tadpoles develop in this body of water. Male parental care has been observed.

== Threats ==
The IUCN classifies this frog as least concern of extinction and it is classified as near threatened in Chile. Deforestation in favor of agriculture, sylviculture, human habitation, and cattle ranching poses some threat.
