= Odontophrynus occidentalis =

Conservation status
- Least Concern (IUCN 3.1)

Scientific classification
- Kingdom: Animalia
- Phylum: Chordata
- Class: Amphibia
- Order: Anura
- Family: Odontophrynidae
- Genus: Odontophrynus
- Species: O. occidentalis

Binomial name
- Odontophrynus occidentalis (Berg, 1886)

Synonyms
- Ceratophrys occidentalis Berg, 1896; Odontophrynus achalensis di Tada, Barla, Martori, and Cei, 1984; Odontophrynus barrioi Cei, Ruiz, and Beçak, 1982

Species of frog

Odontophrynus occidentalis, commonly known as the Cururu lesser escuerzo, is a species of frog in the family Odontophrynidae. It is endemic to western and central Argentina. Its natural habitats are montane forests, montane grasslands, rocky outcrops, and shrubland. Breeding takes place in permanent streams; the development of the tadpoles takes about eight months. It tolerates habitat change but is threatened by water pollution and fires caused by agriculture and mining.

== Description ==
Adult males measure 47–69 mm (1.9–2.7 in) and adult females, based on just two specimens, 54–55 mm (2.1–2.2 in) in snout–vent length. The body is chubby with stout limbs. The head is small and wider than it is long. The canthus rostralis is bluntly rounded. The tympanum is hidden. The fingers have slightly developed fringes, and the toes are slightly webbed. Skin is granular, with scattered, irregularly arranged, rounded glandular warts on dorsally. The parotoid gland are irregular and rounded. Dorsal coloration is brownish with faint lateral and dorsal yellowish longitudinal bands. The warts are darker brown. Ventrally the coloration is bluish or brownish, with scattered white granuli.

The male advertisement call is a trill constituted by a repeated and pulsed note.

== Habitat and conservation ==
Odontophrynus occidentalis occurs in montane forests, montane dry shrublands, montane grasslands and nearby rocky outcrops at elevations of 1,450–2,200 m (4,760–7,220 ft) above sea level. Breeding takes place in permanent mountain streams; the larval developmental period is long, over a year.

This species is common and stable in suitable habitats, but habitat loss and degradation caused by livestock and firewood extraction are still considered threats to this species.
