= Nello Beccari =

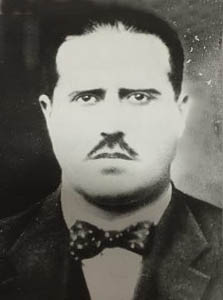

Nello Beccari (11 January 1883 – 20 March 1957) was an Italian professor of comparative and human anatomy. He studied sexual cells of vertebrates and their nervous systems.

Beccari was born at Bagno a Ripoli, Florence, the first son of the botanist Odoardo Beccari and Nella Goretti de Flamin. He studied medicine and surgery at the institute of human anatomy in Florence under Giulio Chiarugi. He served in World War I and returned to work in 1921. In 1922 he became a professor of human anatomy at Catania and after the death of Davide Carazzi in 1925 he became a professor of comparative anatomy at the University of Florence. In 1931 he went on a collecting expedition to British Guyana, and numerous arthropod specimens were obtained. Beccari became interested in the origin of germ cells in vertebrates and conducted histological studies. Emanuele Padoa, Mario Galgano, and Valdo Mazzi were his students and assistants.
