= Liolaemus kingii =

Conservation status
- Least Concern (IUCN 3.1)

Scientific classification
- Kingdom: Animalia
- Phylum: Chordata
- Class: Reptilia
- Order: Squamata
- Suborder: Iguania
- Family: Liolaemidae
- Genus: Liolaemus
- Species: L. kingii

Binomial name
- Liolaemus kingii (Bell, 1843)

Synonyms
- Proctotretus kingii Bell, 1843; Rhytidodeira kingii — Girard, 1858; Liolaemus kingii — Boulenger, 1885

Species of lizard

Liolaemus kingii, also known commonly as King's tree iguana, is a species of lizard in the family Liolaemidae. The species is native to Argentina and Chile.

== Etymology ==
The specific name, kingii, is in honor of Australian marine surveyor Philip Parker King.

== Habitat ==
The preferred natural habitats of L. kingii are shrubland, sandbanks, and coastal hills, at altitudes from sea level to 1,340 m (4,400 ft).

== Diet ==
L. kingii has a mostly insectivorous diet, but also eats plant material.

== Reproduction ==
The mode of reproduction of L. kingii has been described as viviparous and as ovoviviparous, both terms meaning that it gives birth to live young.

== Taxonomy ==
L. kingii is one of 13 species in the L. kingii species group.
