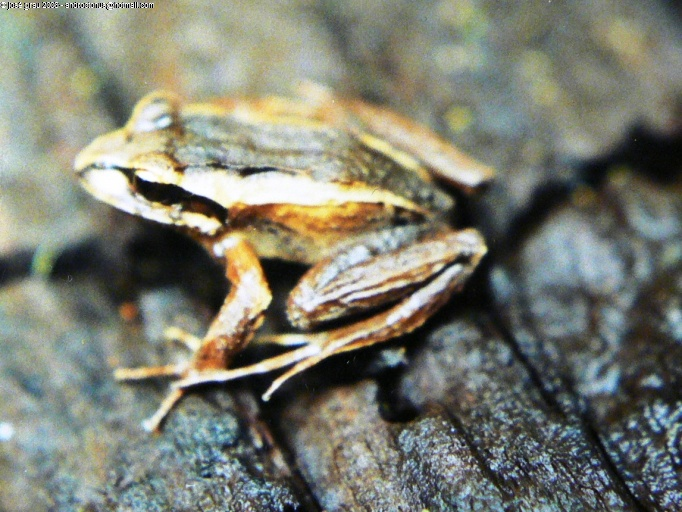
- Batrachyla taeniata

Scientific classification
- Kingdom: Animalia
- Phylum: Chordata
- Class: Amphibia
- Order: Anura
- Superfamily: Hyloidea
- Family: Batrachylidae; Gallardo, 1965

Type genus
- Batrachylus Bell, 1843

Genera
- 4, see text.

= Batrachylidae =

Family of amphibians

Batrachylidae is a family of frogs from southern South America (Argentina and Chile). Before being recognized as a family, Batrachylidae was included as a subfamily (Batrachylinae) in the family Ceratophryidae; this is the taxonomy still suggested by the Integrated Taxonomic Information System (ITIS).

== Species ==
There are four genera in the family:

- Atelognathus Lynch, 1978 (5 species)
- Batrachyla Bell, 1843 (5 species)
- Chaltenobatrachus Basso, Úbeda, Bunge, and Martinazzo, 2011 (1 species)
- Hylorina Bell, 1843 (1 species)
