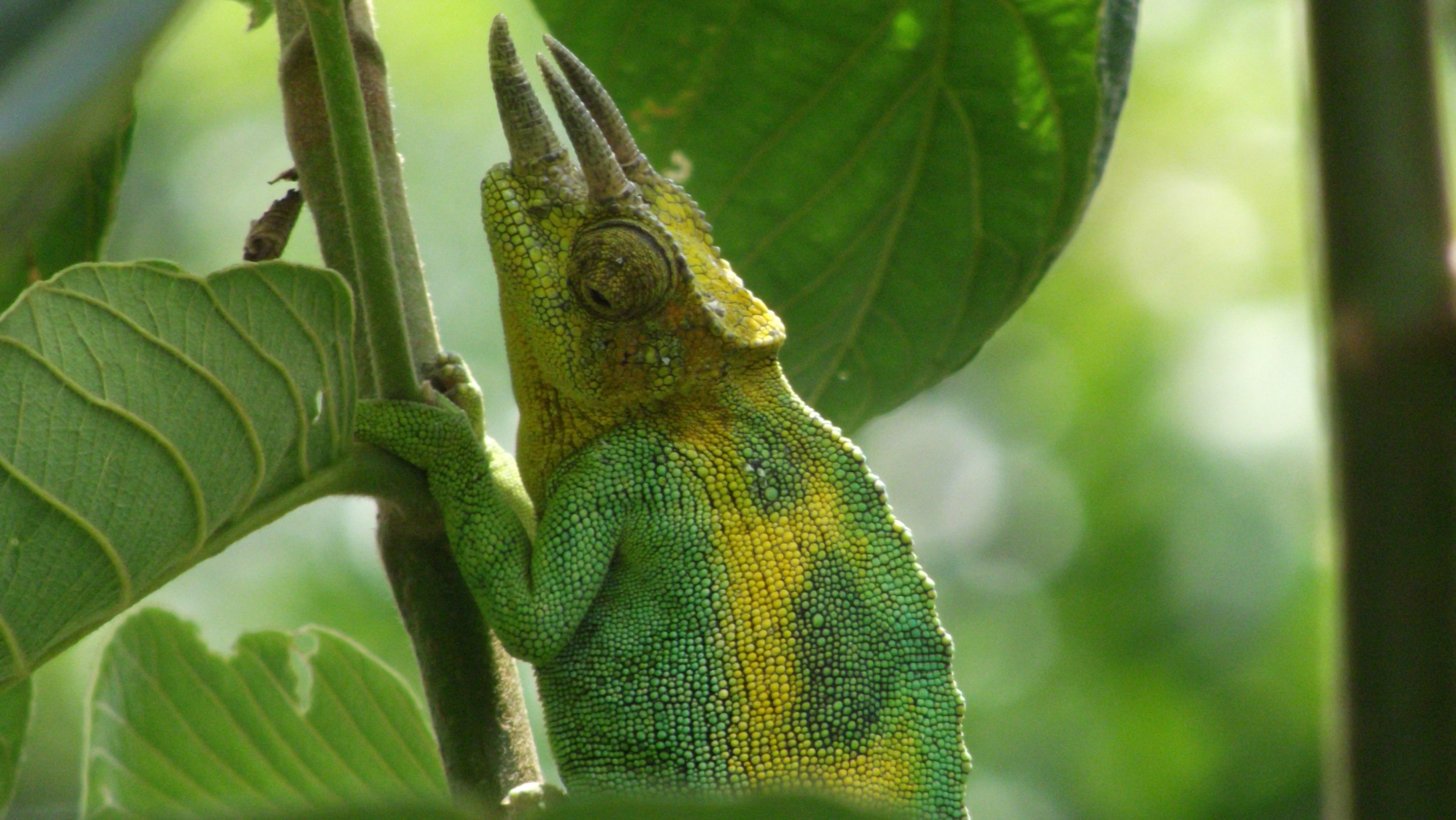
- Male
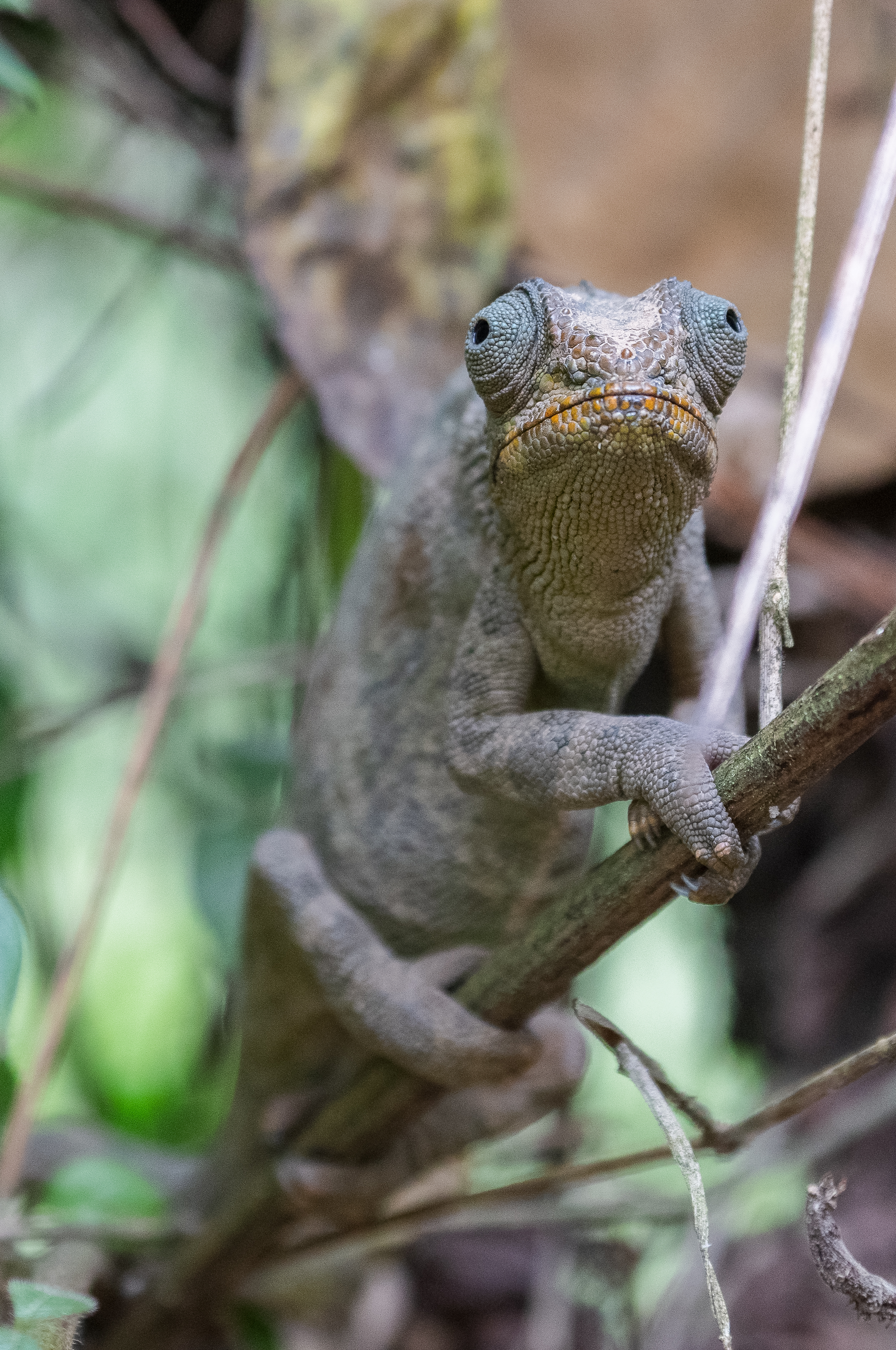
- Female

Conservation status
- Least Concern (IUCN 3.1)

Scientific classification
- Kingdom: Animalia
- Phylum: Chordata
- Class: Reptilia
- Order: Squamata
- Suborder: Iguania
- Family: Chamaeleonidae
- Genus: Trioceros
- Species: T. johnstoni

Binomial name
- Trioceros johnstoni (Boulenger, 1901)

Synonyms
- Chamaeleon johnstoni Boulenger, 1901; Chamaeleo johnstoni — Laurent, 1951; Chamaeleo (Trioceros) johnstoni — Nečas, 1999; Trioceros johnstoni — Tilbury & Tolley, 2009

= Trioceros johnstoni =

Species of lizard

Trioceros johnstoni, known commonly as Johnston's chameleon, Johnston's three-horned chameleon, and the Ruwenzori three-horned chameleon, is a species of chameleon, a lizard in the family Chamaeleonidae. The species is endemic to highlands in the Albertine Rift in central Africa. It reaches up to 30 cm (12 in) in total length (including tail). Only the adult male has three horns. The female is hornless.

== Taxonomy and etymology ==
The three long annulated horns in the male T. johnstoni makes it superficially similar to T. jacksonii and T. werneri, and to an extent also to the short-horned T. fuelleborni and the smooth-horned T. oweni, but they are not close relatives. Its nearest relative is the hornless T. ituriensis.

The specific name johnstoni was given in honour of the British explorer Harry Johnston.

== Distribution and habitat ==
T. johnstoni is found in forests at altitudes between 1,000 and 2,500 m (3,300–8,200 ft) in the Albertine Rift of eastern Democratic Republic of the Congo, western Burundi, western Rwanda, and southwestern Uganda, but also tolerates semi-urbanized environments as long as some trees and bushes remain.

== Behaviour ==
Males of T. johnstoni are fiercely territorial and readily will fight other males, using their horns and biting.

== Reproduction ==
T. johnstoni is oviparous, with the female laying 4–23 eggs per clutch.
