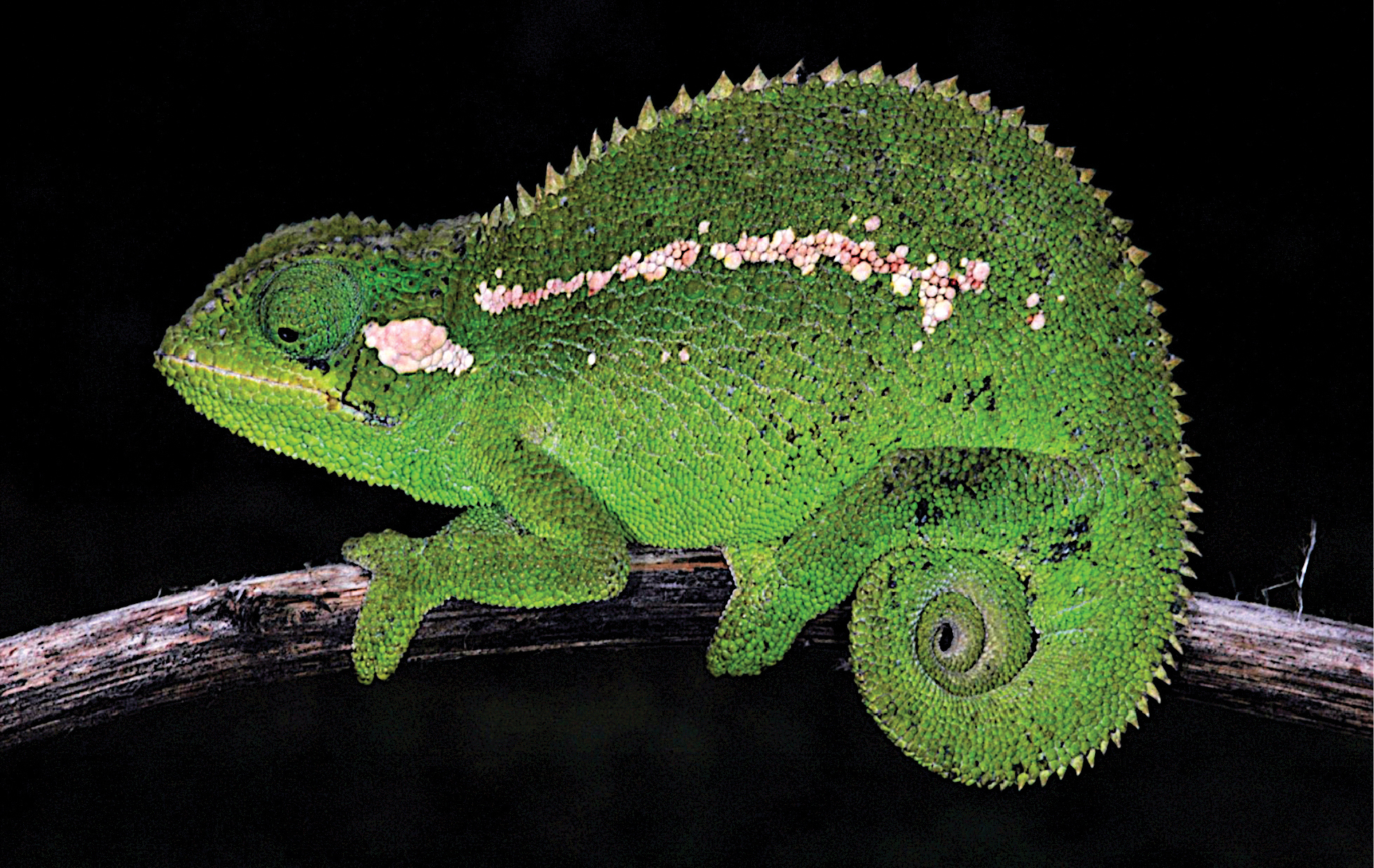

Scientific classification
- Domain: Eukaryota
- Kingdom: Animalia
- Phylum: Chordata
- Class: Reptilia
- Order: Squamata
- Suborder: Iguania
- Family: Chamaeleonidae
- Genus: Trioceros
- Species: T. wolfgangboehmei

Binomial name
- Trioceros wolfgangboehmei Koppetsch, Nečas, & Wipfler, 2021

= Trioceros wolfgangboehmei =

Species of lizard

Wolfgang Böhme's Ethiopian chameleon (Trioceros wolfgangboehmei) is a species of chameleon found in the northern slopes of the Bale Mountains in Ethiopia. It is a small-sized chameleon of the Trioceros affinis species complex. The chameleon is approximately 6 inches (15 centimeters) in length, and are known for their distinctive crest of large, spiny scales along its back. The species is named after Wolfgang Böhme, senior herpetologist at the Zoological Research Museum Alexander Koenig, to honor his contributions to chameleon research.

== Description ==
Wolfgang Böhme's Ethiopian chameleon can be distinguished from other species in the Trioceros affinis species complex though the following characteristics:

1. Prominent and well-developed dorsal crest with a low number of pointed and enlarged cone-shaped scales in a single row reaching to the lower half the tail;
2. Top of the casque posteriorly raised above the dorsal crest;
3. Heterogeneous body scalation containing both small standard scales and enlarged plate-like scales;
4. Canthus parietalis formed from 9–12 enlarged scales;
5. Area between lateral and temporal crest and the posterior rim of the orbit consists of wrinkled enlarged scales;
6. 53-59 flank scales at midbody;
7. Short snout-vent length, only up to 66 millimeters;
8. Unique hemipenis morphology: smooth shaft, with four pairs of thick, pointed papillae and two pairs of non-serrated rotulae.

Female and male T. wolfgangboehmei are similar morphologically. Females have slightly shorter snout-vent lengths on average, lower relative tail lengths, and lower head width/length ratios.

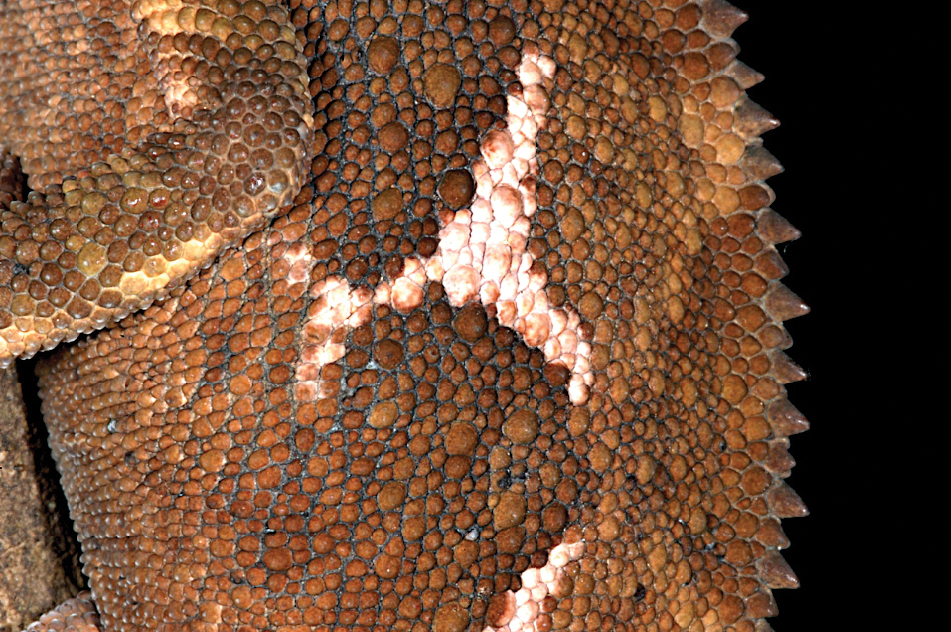
Dorso-lateral longitudinal stripe may be Y-shaped.

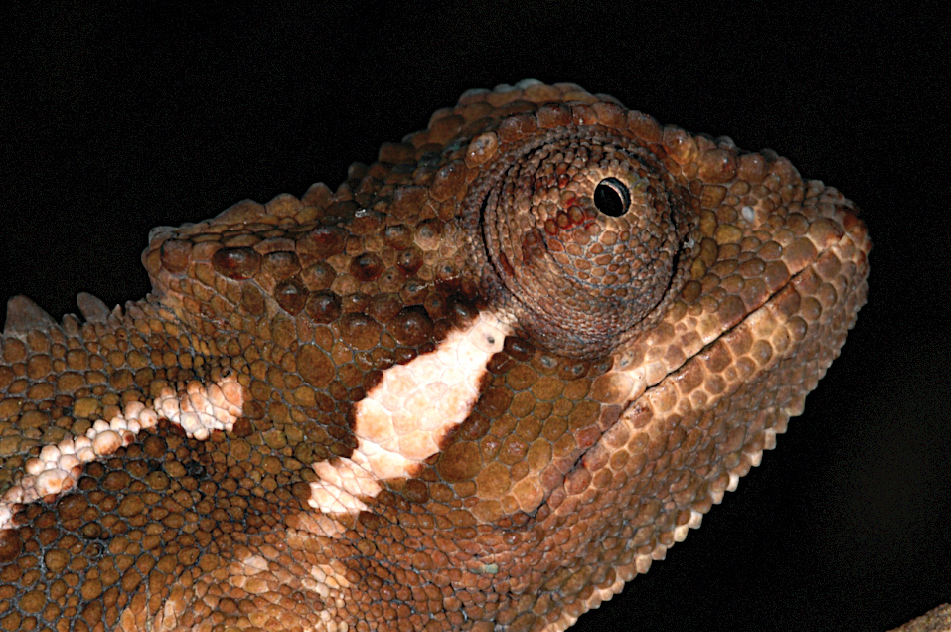
Bright white spot posterior to the orbit.

Male and female adult T. wolfgangboehmei are most commonly yellowish, brownish, or bright green. This color extends generally throughout the body, including on the dorsal crest. Most individuals have a bright white temporal spot posterior to the orbit. A dorso-lateral longitudinal stripe of enlarged, flattened scales may be present as well. This stripe may be continuous, or form a lateral Y-shaped pattern. If present, it is white in males and light orange in females. Some adult individuals may be more beige colored, with reddish stripes around the head. Juvenile specimens are uniformly reddish brown.

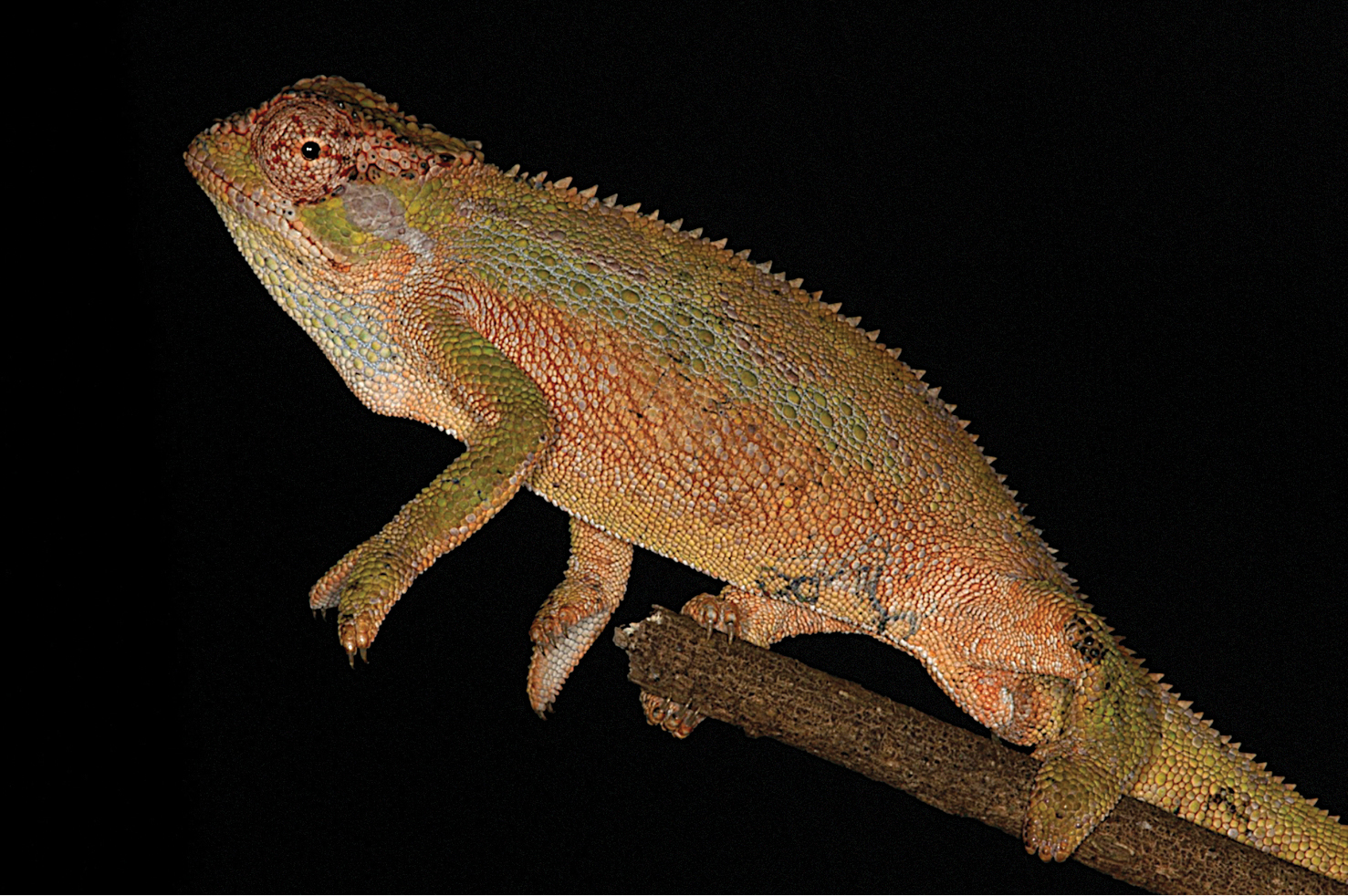
Some adults are beige colored rather than yellowish, brownish, or bright green.

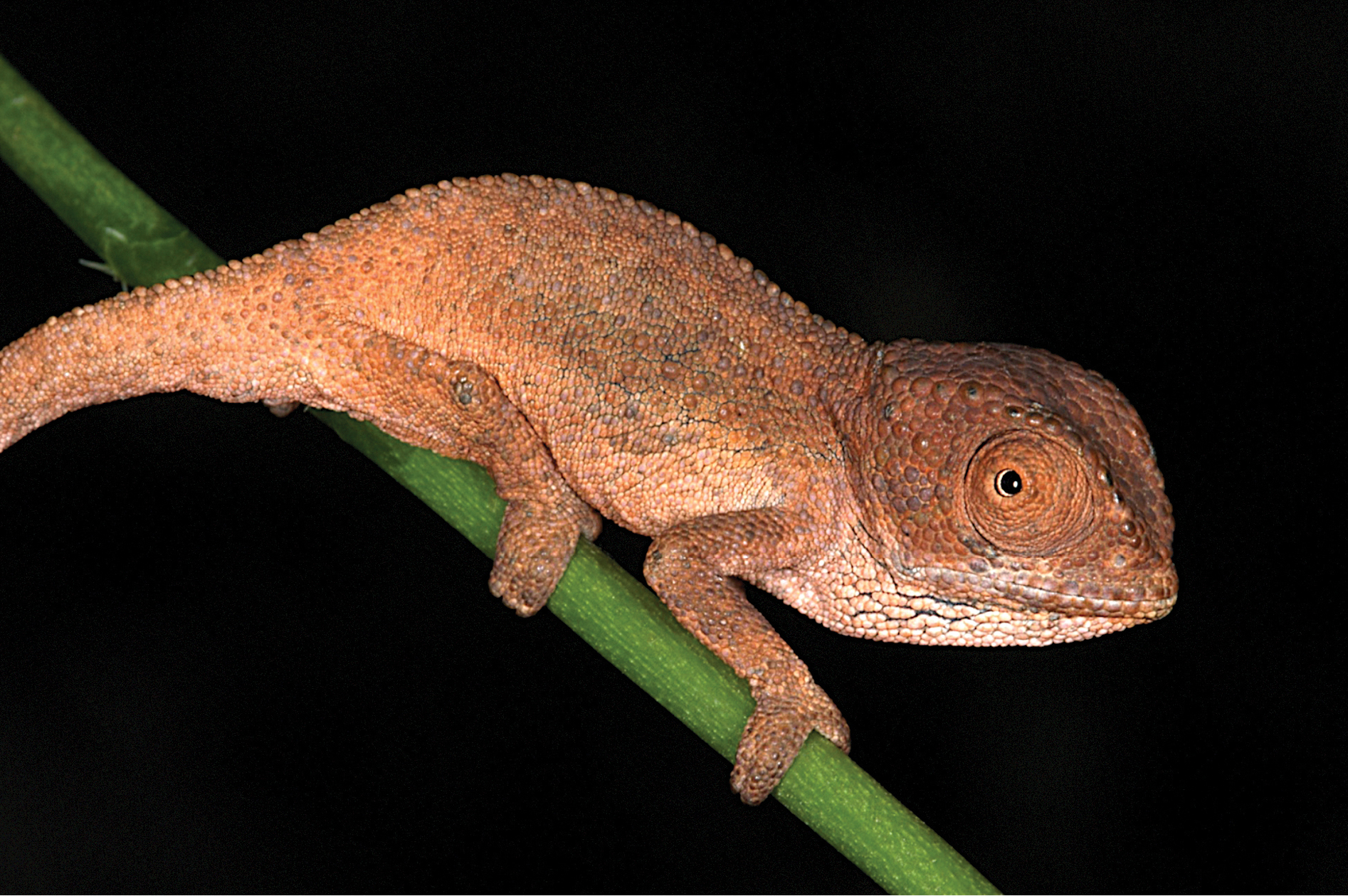
Juvenile T. wolfgangboehmei.

== Habitat and Distribution ==
Population density has been estimated to be 20-40 individuals/hectare in natural forest edges, and 80-110 individuals/hectare in local gardens and farm areas.

Trioceros wolfgangboehmei is native to the Bale Mountains in Dinsho and Goba. T. wolfgangboehmei resides on the northern and north-eastern slopes of the mountains, unlike other Trioceros species (T. harennae and T. balebicornutus) that are confined to the southern slopes. They primarily reside at altitudes around 2,000 to 3,000 meters above sea level. They prefer forest-edge zones, but may also live in the city centers of Goba and Robe in small fields and gardens. Adult chameleons prefer to live on small trees and bushes, whereas juveniles prefer grass adjacent to trees.

== Conservation ==
The official conservation status of Trioceros wolfgangboehmei is unknown with insufficient evidence in terms of total distribution. The species is currently restricted to the northern slopes of the Bale Mountains, part of which is protected within the Bale Mountains National Park. Habitat destruction due to urbanization, deforestation, or fires outside of the park may be of concern. However, T. wolfgangboehmei are found in higher densities in man-modified areas.
