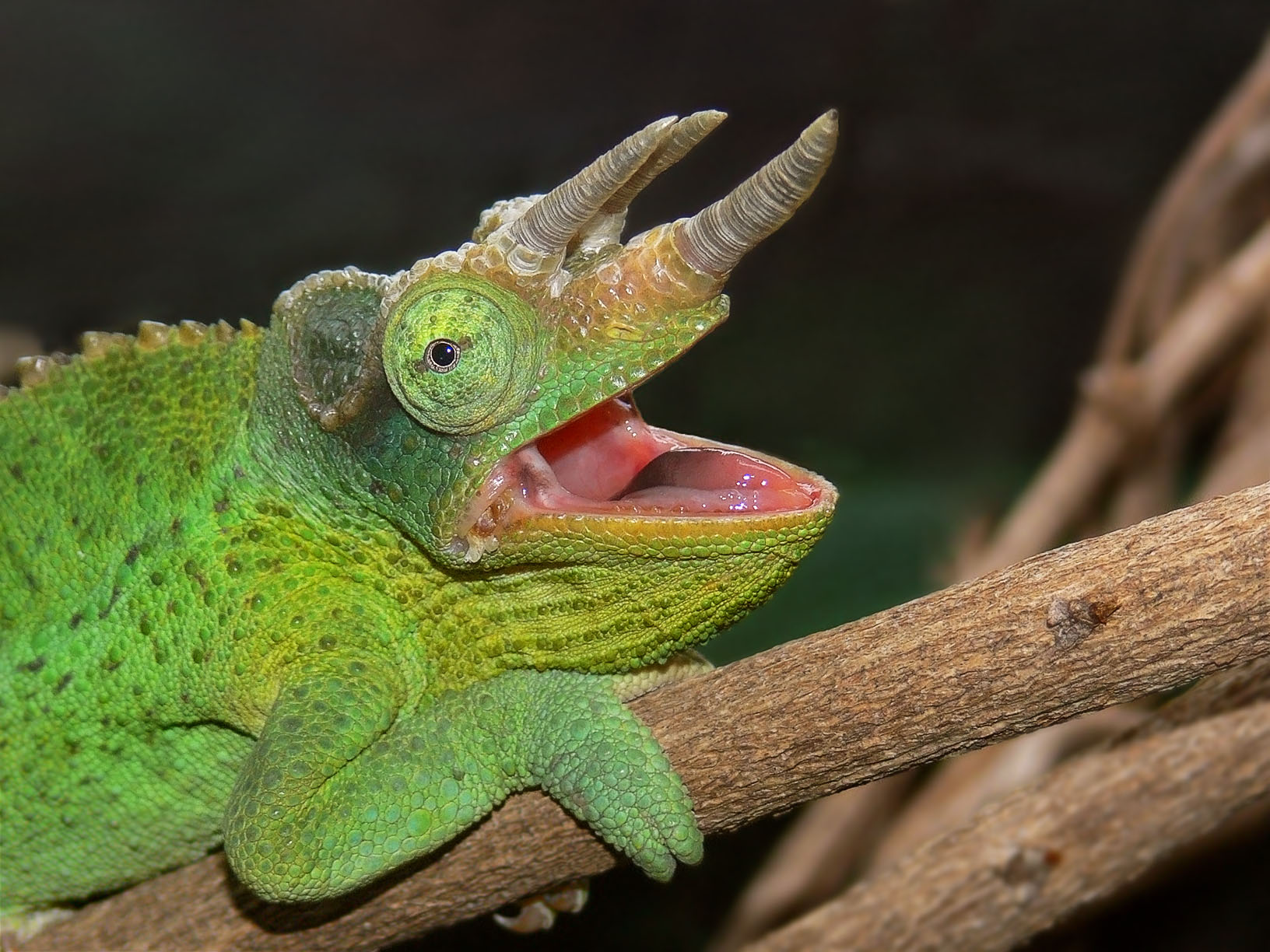
- Jackson's chameleon (Trioceros jacksonii)

Scientific classification
- Kingdom: Animalia
- Phylum: Chordata
- Class: Reptilia
- Order: Squamata
- Suborder: Iguania
- Family: Chamaeleonidae
- Subfamily: Chamaeleoninae
- Genus: Trioceros; Swainson, 1839

Type species
- Chamaeleo oweni Gray, 1831

= Trioceros =

Genus of lizards

Trioceros is a genus of lizards in the family Chamaeleonidae, the chameleons, native to lowlands and highlands in the African mainland, ranging from Ethiopia south to Mozambique and west as far as Ghana. Trioceros was considered a subgenus of the genus Chamaeleo until 2009, when it was elevated to full genus level.

Trioceros vary greatly in appearance and size. Many species in the genus have various ornaments, such as one to four horns on the head, crests on the nape or throat, or spines or sail-like structures on the top of the back or tail. They are primarily found in adult males, but generally reduced or even absent in females, and there are also many species in the genus where both sexes lack conspicuous ornaments. Although horn-like structures are found in certain other chameleon genera, Trioceros is the only where it can be cylindrical, annulated and bony.

Trioceros contains species that lay eggs (similar to most other chameleon genera) and species that give birth to live young (similar to only Bradypodion). It is likely that giving birth to live young is an adaption to temperature, as it in Trioceros generally is found in species from highlands. The relatively cold highland climate slows the development of eggs laid in the ground; when instead retained inside the body until birth, a female can actively sun bask to increase the temperature.

== Species ==
The following species are recognized as being valid.

Image	Name	Common name	Subspecies	Distribution
	Trioceros affinis (Rüppell, 1845)	beardless Ethiopian montane chameleon, Rüppell's desert chameleon		Ethiopia.
	Trioceros balebicornutus (Tilbury, 1998)	Bale two-horned chameleon		Ethiopia.
	Trioceros bitaeniatus (Fischer, 1884)	side-striped chameleon, two-lined chameleon		Ethiopia, southern Sudan, Somalia, Kenya, Tanzania, Uganda, and the northeastern Democratic Republic of the Congo.
	Trioceros camerunensis (L. Müller, 1909)	Cameroon dwarf chameleon		Cameroon.
	Trioceros chapini (de Witte, 1964)	Chapin's chameleon, grey chameleon		Gabon and Democratic Republic of the Congo.
	Trioceros conirostratus (Tilbury, 1998)	South Sudanese unicorn chameleon		South Sudan and Uganda.
	Trioceros cristatus (Stutchbury, 1837)	crested chameleon, fringed chameleon		Bioko, Equatorial Guinea, Cameroon, Central African Republic, Democratic Republic of the Congo, Republic of the Congo, Gabon, Nigeria, Ghana, and Togo.
	Trioceros deremensis (Matschie, 1892)	Usambara giant three-horned chameleon, wavy chameleon		East Usambara, Uluguru, Nguu and Nguru Mountains, and Udzungwa Mountains.
	Trioceros ellioti (Günther, 1895)	Elliot's chameleon, montane side-striped chameleon, Elliot's groove-throated chameleon		Burundi, Kenya, South Sudan, Rwanda, Tanzania, Uganda, and Democratic Republic of the Congo.
	Trioceros feae (Boulenger, 1906)	Bioko hornless chameleon, Bioko montane chameleon, Fea's chameleon		Bioko.
	Trioceros fuelleborni (Tornier, 1900)	(named after Friedrich Fülleborn), flapjack chameleon, Ngosi Volcano chameleon, Poroto three-horned chameleon, mountain three-horned chameleon		Tanzania
	Trioceros goetzei (Tornier, 1899)	Goetze's chameleon, Ilolo chameleon, Goetze's whistling chameleon	Trioceros goetzei goetzei (Tornier, 1899) – Goetze's whistling chameleon; Trioceros goetzei nyikae (Loveridge, 1953) – Nyika whistling chameleon	Tanzania and Malawi.
	Trioceros hanangensis Krause & Böhme, 2010	Mount Hanang montane dwarf chameleon, Mount Hanang chameleon		Tanzania
	Trioceros harennae (Largen, 1995)	Harenna hornless chameleon	Trioceros harennae harennae (Largen, 1995) – Harenna hornless chameleon; Trioceros harennae fitchi (Nečas, 2004) – Fitch's Harenna hornless chameleon	Ethiopia
	Trioceros hoehnelii (Steindachner, 1891)	helmeted chameleon, high-casqued chameleon, von Höhnel's chameleon		Kenya and Uganda
	Trioceros incornutus (Loveridge, 1932)	Ukinga hornless chameleon		Tanzania
	Trioceros ituriensis (K.P. Schmidt, 1919)	Ituri forest chameleon		Democratic Republic of the Congo and Kenya.
	Trioceros jacksonii (Boulenger, 1896)	Jackson's chameleon	Trioceros jacksonii jacksonii (Boulenger, 1896) – Jackson's three-horned chameleon; Trioceros jacksonii merumontanus (Rand, 1958) – dwarf Jackson's chameleon; Trioceros jacksonii xantholophus (Eason, Ferguson & Hebrard, 1988) – Mount Kenya three-horned chameleon, yellow-crested Jackson's chameleon	south-central Kenya and northern Tanzania.
	Trioceros johnstoni (Boulenger, 1901)	Johnston's chameleon, Johnston's three-horned chameleon, Ruwenzori three-horned chameleon		Democratic Republic of the Congo, Burundi, Rwanda, and Uganda
	Trioceros kinangopensis Stipala et al., 2012	Aberdare Mountains dwarf chameleon		Kenya.
	Trioceros kinetensis (K.P. Schmidt, 1943)	Mount Kineti montane dwarf chameleon, Mount Kineti chameleon		South Sudan.
	Trioceros laterispinis (Loveridge, 1932)	spiny-flanked chameleon		Tanzania.
	Trioceros marsabitensis (Tilbury, 1991)	Marsabit one-horned chameleon, Mt. Marsabit chameleon, Tilbury's chameleon		Kenya.
	Trioceros melleri (Gray, 1865)	giant one-horned chameleon, Meller's chameleon, Meller's giant one-horned chameleon		Malawi, northern Mozambique, and Tanzania
	Trioceros montium (Buchholz, 1874)	Cameroon sailfin chameleon		Cameroon.
	Trioceros narraioca (Nečas, Modrý & Šlapeta, 2003)	Mount Kulal chameleon or Mount Kulal stump-nosed chameleon		Kenya
	Trioceros ntunte (Nečas, Modry & Slapeta, 2005)	Mount Nyiru chameleon, Nyiru montane dwarf chameleon		Kenya
	Trioceros nyirit Stipala et al., 2011	Mount Mtelo stump-nosed chameleon, Pokot chameleon		Kenya
	Trioceros oweni (Gray, 1831)	Owen's chameleon		Nigeria in the north, to Angola in the south, and Burundi in the east
	Trioceros perreti (Klaver & Böhme, 1992)	Perret's chameleon, Perret's montane chameleon		Cameroon.
	Trioceros pfefferi (Tornier, 1900)	Pfeffer's two-horned chameleon, Pfeffer's chameleon, Bakossi two-horned chameleon		Cameroon.
	Trioceros quadricornis (Tornier, 1899)	four-horned chameleon	Trioceros quadricornis quadricornis (Tornier, 1899) – southern four-horned chameleon; Trioceros quadricornis eisentrauti (Mertens, 1968) – Rumpi Hills chameleon; Trioceros quadricornis gracilior (Böhme & Klaver, 1981) – northern four-horned chameleon	western Cameroon and southeastern Nigeria.
	Trioceros rudis (Boulenger, 1906)	coarse chameleon, rough chameleon, Ruwenzori side-striped chameleon, Rwenzori bearded montane dwarf chameleon		western Uganda, Rwanda, Burundi, and eastern DR Congo
	Trioceros schoutedeni (Laurent, 1952)	Schouteden's montane dwarf chameleon		Rwanda and Democratic Republic of the Congo.
	Trioceros schubotzi (Sternfeld, 1912)	Mount Kenya montane dwarf chameleon, Mount Kenya side-striped chameleon, Schubotz's chameleon		Kenya
	Trioceros serratus (Mertens, 1922)			Cameroon
	Trioceros sternfeldi (Rand, 1963)	(named after Richard Sternfeld), Crater Highlands side-striped chameleon, Tanzanian montane dwarf chameleon		Tanzania
	Trioceros tempeli (Tornier, 1899)	Tanzania mountain chameleon, Tempel's chameleon, Udzungwa double-bearded chameleon		Tanzania
	Trioceros werneri (Tornier, 1899)	Werner's chameleon, Wemer's chameleon, Wemer's three-horned chameleon		Tanzania
	Trioceros wiedersheimi (Nieden, 1910)	Mount Lefo chameleon, Wiedersheim's chameleon		Cameroon and Nigeria
	Trioceros wolfgangboehmei Koppetsch, Nečas & Wipfler, 2021			Ethiopia.

Nota bene: In the above list, a binomial authority or trinomial authority in parentheses indicates that the species or subspecies was originally described in a genus other than Trioceros.
