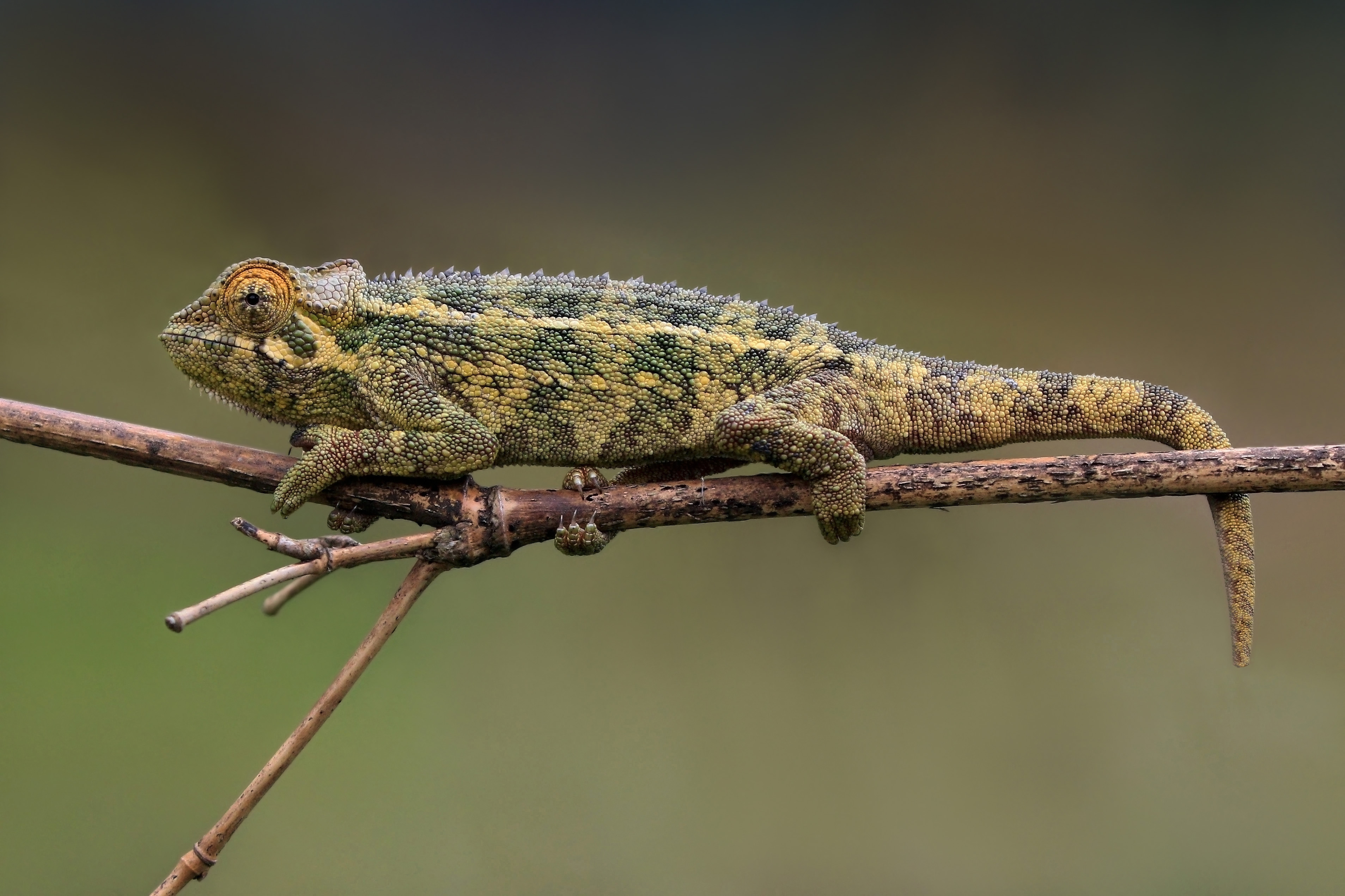
- In farmland near Mount Karisimbi, Rwanda

Conservation status
- Least Concern (IUCN 3.1)

Scientific classification
- Kingdom: Animalia
- Phylum: Chordata
- Class: Reptilia
- Order: Squamata
- Suborder: Iguania
- Family: Chamaeleonidae
- Genus: Trioceros
- Species: T. rudis

Binomial name
- Trioceros rudis (Boulenger, 1906)

= Coarse chameleon =

Species of lizard

The coarse chameleon (Trioceros rudis), also known as the rudis chameleon, Ruwenzori side-striped chameleon or the Rwenzori bearded chameleon, is a chameleon from western Uganda, Rwanda, Burundi, and eastern DR Congo. Contrary to common belief, this species does not inhabit Mount Meru, Tanzania. Tanzania chameleons called T. rudis are in fact T. sternfeldi.

This chameleon is often found in open habitats, inhabiting low bushes and shrubs (often described as 'patchy open country") in the transitional zones between grasslands, reedbeds and montane heath.

T. rudis is small (10 to 15 cm (3.9 to 5.9 in)) and lacks horns or occipital lobes. It has a long tail and a small crest.
