= Charles Meller =

Charles James Meller (1836 – 26 February 1869) was a British surgeon and naturalist who joined the Zambesi expedition of David Livingstone. He collected a number of natural history specimens on the expedition and several taxa have been named after him.

Meller was born in Cobham. He studied medicine at St Mary’s Hospital Medical School and became MRCS in 1857. He was a house surgeon at St Mary's Hospital in Paddington around 1856. He also served as a curator of the museum of the Medical School of St. Mary's. He joined the Zambesi expedition of David Livingstone in February 1861 as a surgeon-naturalist. He was present at the death of Richard Thornton, the geologist of the expedition. He visited Mauritius in 1862 with Archibald Anson and went to Madagascar along with Bishop Vincent William Ryan. He contracted an infection, likely malaria, in Africa which led to frequent fevers from which he eventually died. He wrote on the febrile diseases of the region. He was appointed vice-consul in Madagascar in 1863 and worked for two years. He visited Mauritius in 1866 and took up the of director of the Pamplemousses Botanic Garden in Port Louis, Mauritius and was involved in the introduction of various plants including varieties of sugar cane. He later visited Melbourne and Sydney in 1868 to look at sugarcane varieties and during his travels he got an attack of fever and he was taken from Sydney to Berrima where the cooler air was thought to help. He died there while being taken care of by his sister who came from England. He was buried in Berrima.

The duck Anas melleri, the mongoose Rhynchogale melleri, Meller's chameleon, and the plant genus Mellera are named after him.
