= Spiny-flanked chameleon =

Conservation status
- Endangered (IUCN 3.1)

Scientific classification
- Kingdom: Animalia
- Phylum: Chordata
- Class: Reptilia
- Order: Squamata
- Suborder: Iguania
- Family: Chamaeleonidae
- Genus: Trioceros
- Species: T. laterispinis

Binomial name
- Trioceros laterispinis (Loveridge, 1932)

Synonyms
- Chamaeleon laterispinis Loveridge, 1932

Species of lizard

The spiny-flanked chameleon (Trioceros laterispinis), also known as the spiny-sided chameleon, is a species of chameleon endemic to Tanzania. It was first described in 1932 by Arthur Loveridge.

== Distribution and habitat ==
Trioceros laterispinis is only found in one mountain range, the Udzungwa Mountains, part of the Eastern Arc Mountains in the United Republic of Tanzania, East Africa. The type locality is Kigogo, Udzungwa Mountains, Tanzania, and another is Kibau Iyaya in the southwestern Udzungwa Mountains. It is currently found mostly in the vicinity of Mufindi and Kigogo, but its range covers a total area of 11,529 km^{2} (4,451 sq mi). T. laterispinis is collected for the international pet trade industry. The true population of the species is unknown and no trend has been found. Its habitat is forests and dense woodland and it seems to have a preference for shrubs and small understorey trees rather than towering giants. Much of the forest is fragmented into small patches and it is threatened by a high rate of destruction of its habitat for agricultural purposes. The International Union for Conservation of Nature (IUCN) classed this species as Endangered and it is listed in Appendix II of the CITES treaty. This species gives birth to live young.

== Taxonomy ==
Trioceros laterispinis was first described in 1932 by British herpetologist and biologist Arthur Loveridge as Chamaeleon laterispinis. It was described under the same name in 1966 by Daan and Hillenius. In 1982, Böhme described it as the Chamaeleo laterispinis brookesiaeformis, and in 1999, Necas described it as the Chamaeleo laterispinis. Tilbury and Tolley described it as Trioceros laterispinis in 2009. It is commonly also known as the spiny-flanked chameleon.
