= Trioceros conirostratus =

Conservation status
- Least Concern (IUCN 3.1)

Scientific classification
- Kingdom: Animalia
- Phylum: Chordata
- Class: Reptilia
- Order: Squamata
- Suborder: Iguania
- Family: Chamaeleonidae
- Genus: Trioceros
- Species: T. conirostratus

Binomial name
- Trioceros conirostratus (Tilbury, 1998)

Species of lizard

Trioceros conirostratus, the South Sudanese unicorn chameleon, is a species of chameleon found in South Sudan and Uganda.
