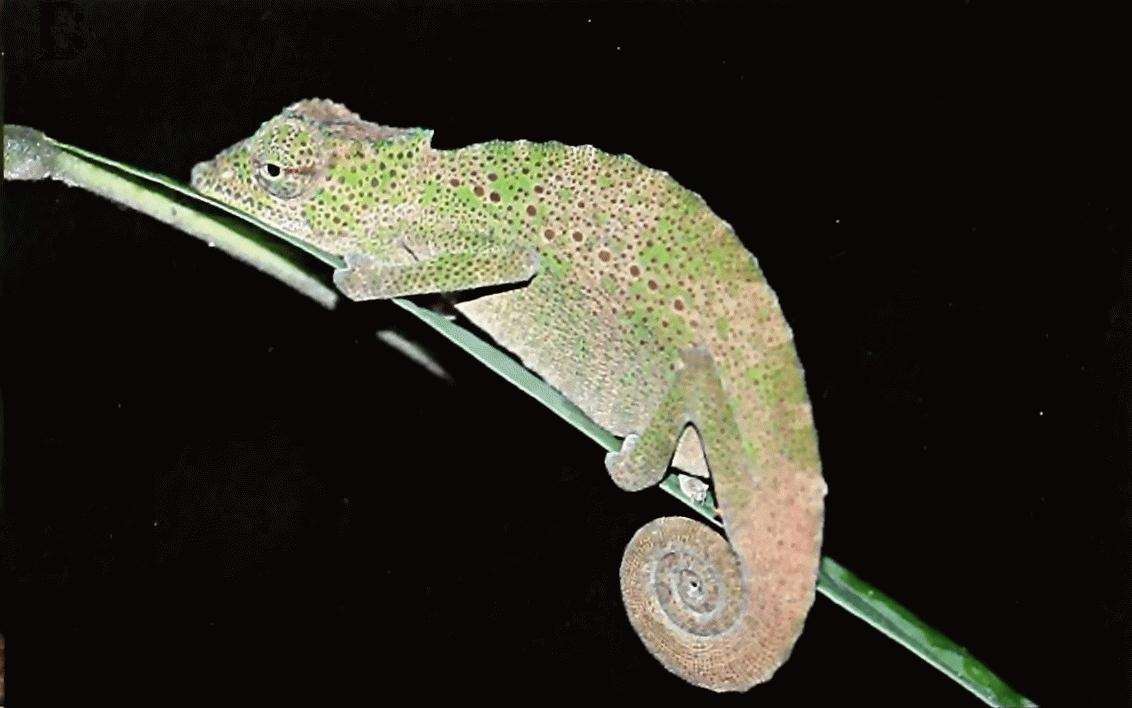

Conservation status
- Least Concern (IUCN 3.1)

Scientific classification
- Kingdom: Animalia
- Phylum: Chordata
- Class: Reptilia
- Order: Squamata
- Suborder: Iguania
- Family: Chamaeleonidae
- Genus: Trioceros
- Species: T. camerunensis

Binomial name
- Trioceros camerunensis (Müller, 1909)

= Trioceros camerunensis =

Species of lizard

Trioceros camerunensis, the Cameroon dwarf chameleon, is a species of chameleon endemic to Cameroon.
