= Trioceros ntunte =

Conservation status
- Data Deficient (IUCN 3.1)
- CITES Appendix II (CITES)

Scientific classification
- Kingdom: Animalia
- Phylum: Chordata
- Class: Reptilia
- Order: Squamata
- Suborder: Iguania
- Family: Chamaeleonidae
- Genus: Trioceros
- Species: T. ntunte

Binomial name
- Trioceros ntunte (Necas, Modry, & Slapeta, 2005)

Species of lizard

Trioceros ntunte, the Mount Nyiru chameleon or Nyiru montane chameleon, is a species of chameleon endemic to Kenya. They are ovoviviparous.
