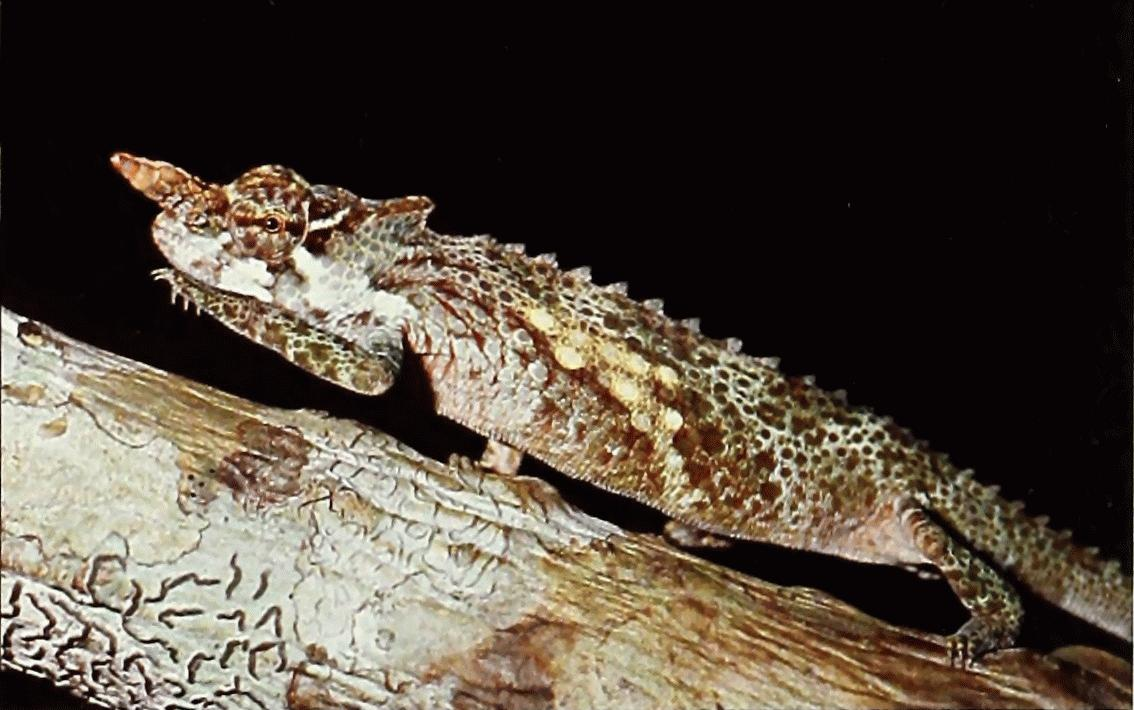

Conservation status
- Endangered (IUCN 3.1)

Scientific classification
- Kingdom: Animalia
- Phylum: Chordata
- Class: Reptilia
- Order: Squamata
- Suborder: Iguania
- Family: Chamaeleonidae
- Genus: Trioceros
- Species: T. pfefferi

Binomial name
- Trioceros pfefferi (Tornier, 1900)

= Trioceros pfefferi =

Species of lizard

Trioceros pfefferi, Pfeffer's chameleon or the Bakossi two-horned chameleon, is a species of chameleon endemic to Cameroon.
