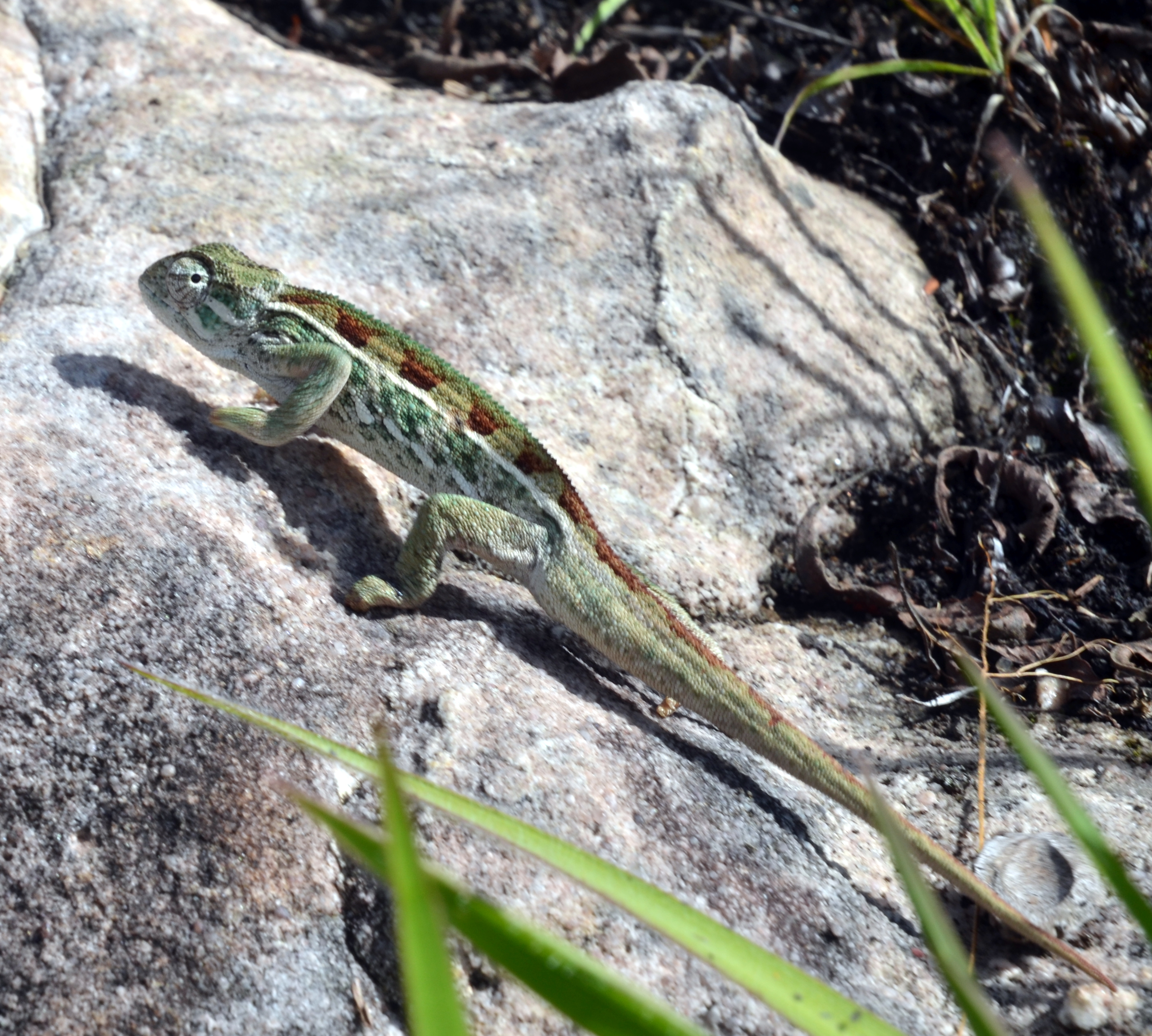

Conservation status
- Least Concern (IUCN 3.1)

Scientific classification
- Kingdom: Animalia
- Phylum: Chordata
- Class: Reptilia
- Order: Squamata
- Suborder: Iguania
- Family: Chamaeleonidae
- Genus: Trioceros
- Species: T. tempeli

Binomial name
- Trioceros tempeli (Tornier, 1899)

= Trioceros tempeli =

Species of lizard

Trioceros tempeli, the Tanzania mountain chameleon or Udzungwa double-bearded chameleon, is a species of chameleon endemic to Tanzania.
