= Trioceros kinetensis =

Conservation status
- Data Deficient (IUCN 3.1)

Scientific classification
- Kingdom: Animalia
- Phylum: Chordata
- Class: Reptilia
- Order: Squamata
- Suborder: Iguania
- Family: Chamaeleonidae
- Genus: Trioceros
- Species: T. kinetensis

Binomial name
- Trioceros kinetensis Schmidt, 1943)

Species of lizard

Trioceros kinetensis, or the Mount Kineti chameleon, is a species of chameleon found in South Sudan.
