= Trioceros marsabitensis =

Conservation status
- Near Threatened (IUCN 3.1)

Scientific classification
- Kingdom: Animalia
- Phylum: Chordata
- Class: Reptilia
- Order: Squamata
- Suborder: Iguania
- Family: Chamaeleonidae
- Genus: Trioceros
- Species: T. marsabitensis

Binomial name
- Trioceros marsabitensis (Tilbury, 1991)

Species of lizard

Trioceros marsabitensis, Tilbury's chameleon, Mount Marsabit chameleon, or Mount Marsabit one-horned chameleon, is a species of chameleon endemic to Kenya.
