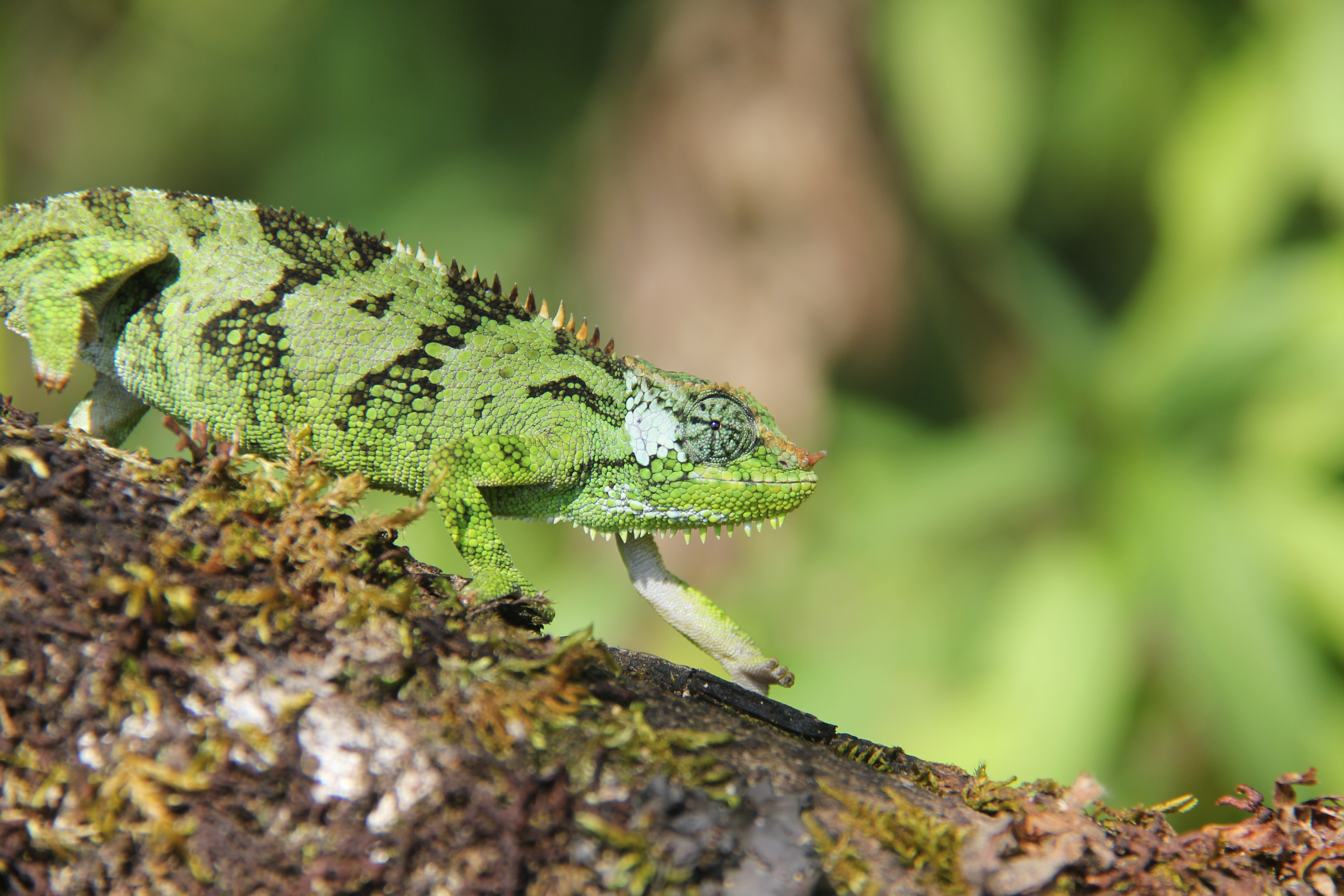

Conservation status
- Near Threatened (IUCN 3.1)

Scientific classification
- Kingdom: Animalia
- Phylum: Chordata
- Class: Reptilia
- Order: Squamata
- Suborder: Iguania
- Family: Chamaeleonidae
- Genus: Trioceros
- Species: T. balebicornutus

Binomial name
- Trioceros balebicornutus (Tilbury, 1998)

= Trioceros balebicornutus =

Species of lizard

Trioceros balebicornutus, the Bale two-horned chameleon, is a species of chameleon. It is endemic to the Bale Mountains, central Ethiopia.
