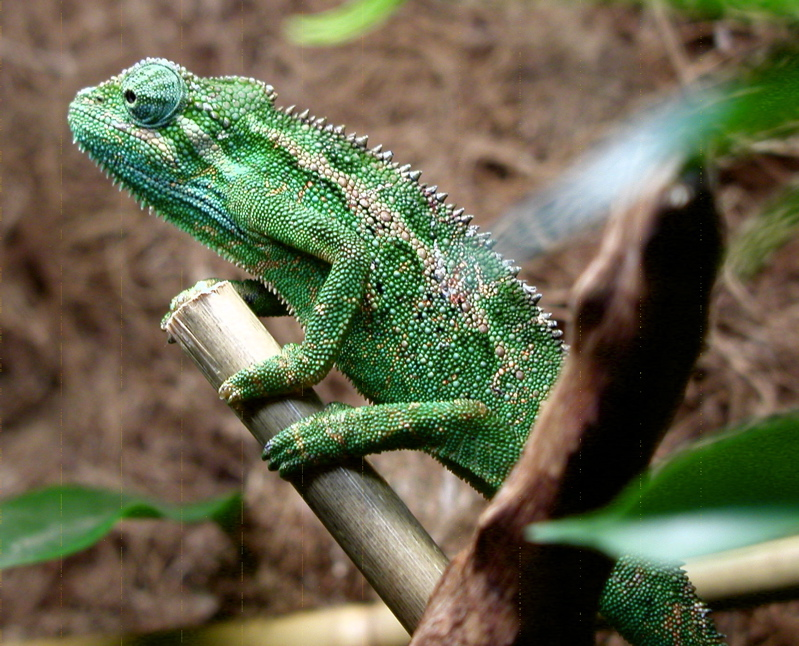

Conservation status
- Least Concern (IUCN 3.1)

Scientific classification
- Kingdom: Animalia
- Phylum: Chordata
- Class: Reptilia
- Order: Squamata
- Suborder: Iguania
- Family: Chamaeleonidae
- Genus: Trioceros
- Species: T. ellioti

Binomial name
- Trioceros ellioti (Günther, 1895)

Synonyms
- Chamaeleon ellioti Günther, 1895; Chamaeleon bequaerti de Witte, 1922; Chamaeleon bitaeniatus ellioti — Lönnberg, 1922; Chamaeleo ellioti — Rand, 1963; Chamaeleo (Trioceros) ellioti — Nečas, 1999; Trioceros ellioti — Tilbury & Tolley, 2009

= Trioceros ellioti =

Species of lizard

Trioceros ellioti, also known commonly as Elliot's chameleon, Elliot's groove-throated chameleon, and the montane side-striped chameleon, is a species of lizard in the family Chamaeleonidae. The species is indigenous to Africa.

== Etymology ==
The specific name, ellioti, is in honor of British botanist George Francis Scott Elliot.

== Geographic range ==
T. ellioti is found in Burundi, Democratic Republic of the Congo, Kenya, Rwanda, South Sudan, Tanzania, and Uganda.

== Habitat ==
The preferred natural habitats of T. ellioti include forest, savanna, shrubland, and grassland, at altitudes of 1,200–1,800 m (3,900–5,900 ft). It has also been found in disturbed areas such as plantations, gardens, and open fields.

== Reproduction ==
The mode of reproduction of T. ellioti has been described as viviparous and as ovoviviparous.
