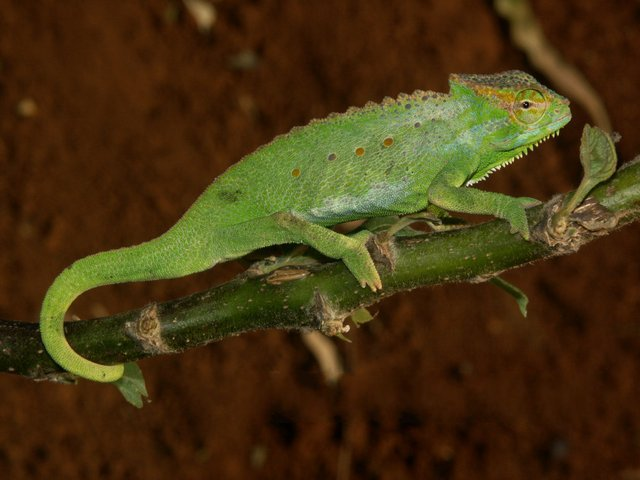

Conservation status
- Data Deficient (IUCN 3.1)

Scientific classification
- Kingdom: Animalia
- Phylum: Chordata
- Class: Reptilia
- Order: Squamata
- Suborder: Iguania
- Family: Chamaeleonidae
- Genus: Trioceros
- Species: T. wiedersheimi

Binomial name
- Trioceros wiedersheimi (Nieden, 1910)

= Trioceros wiedersheimi =

Species of lizard

Trioceros wiedersheimi, the Mount Lefo chameleon or Wiedersheim's montane chameleon, is a species of chameleon found in Cameroon and Nigeria.
