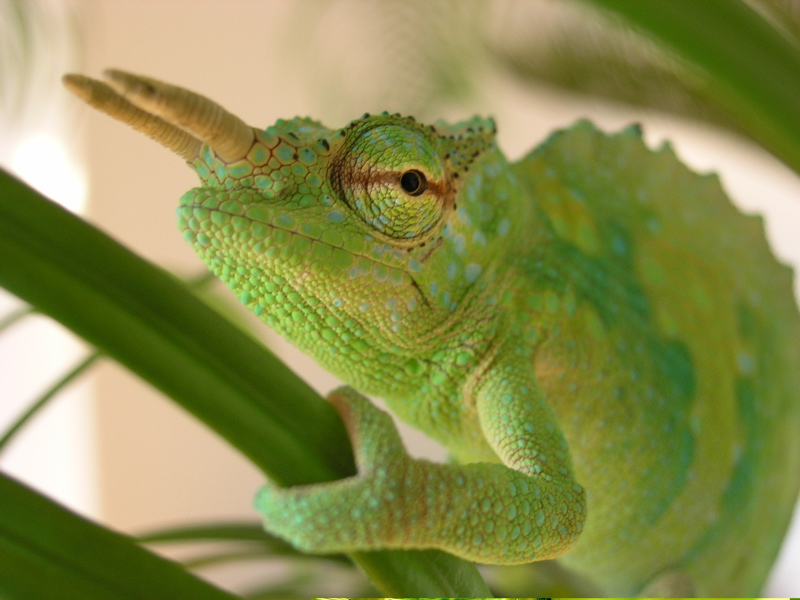

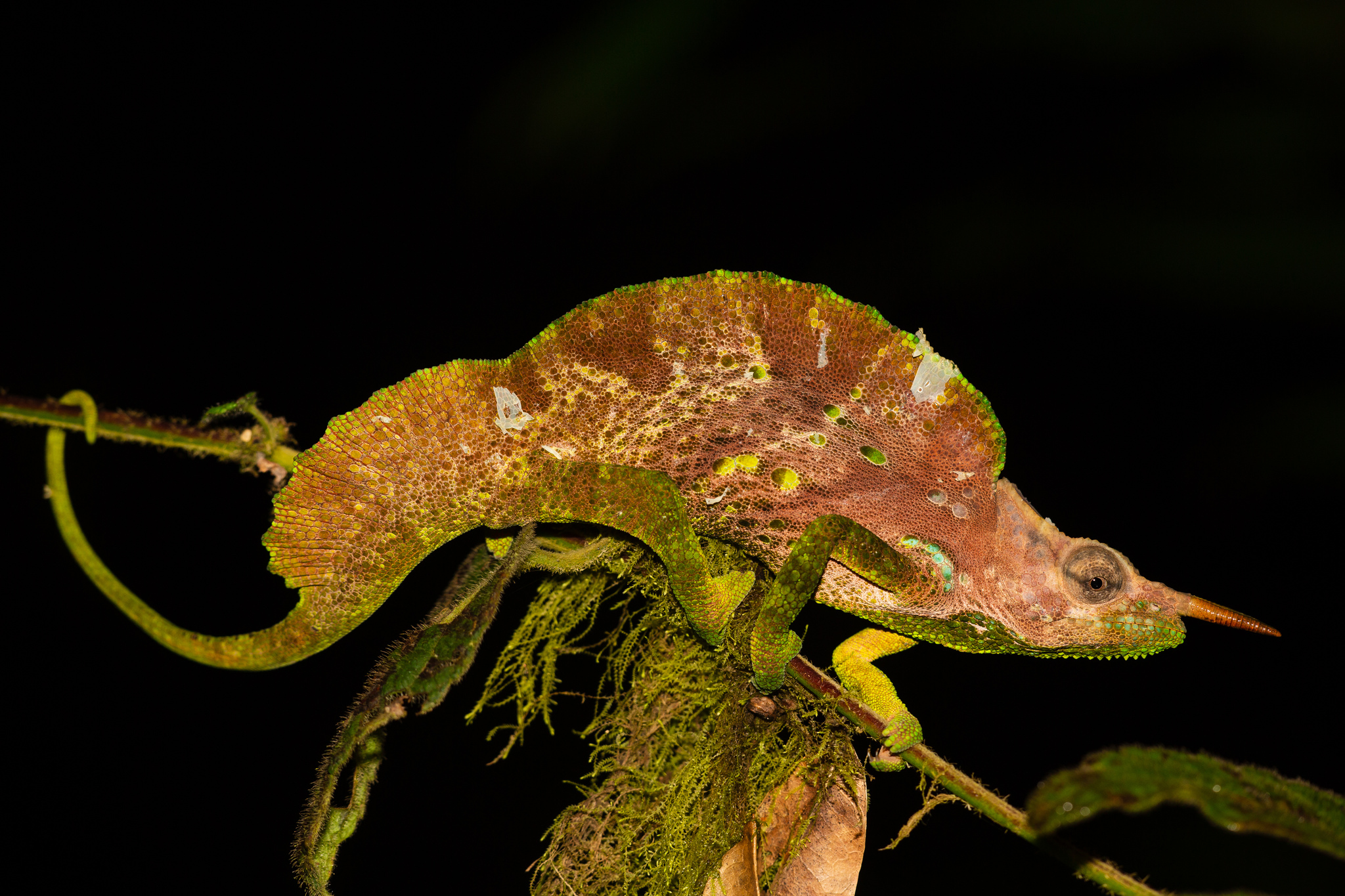
- Close-up of head and full body view of two males

Conservation status
- Near Threatened (IUCN 3.1)

Scientific classification
- Kingdom: Animalia
- Phylum: Chordata
- Class: Reptilia
- Order: Squamata
- Suborder: Iguania
- Family: Chamaeleonidae
- Genus: Trioceros
- Species: T. montium

Binomial name
- Trioceros montium (Buchholz, 1874)
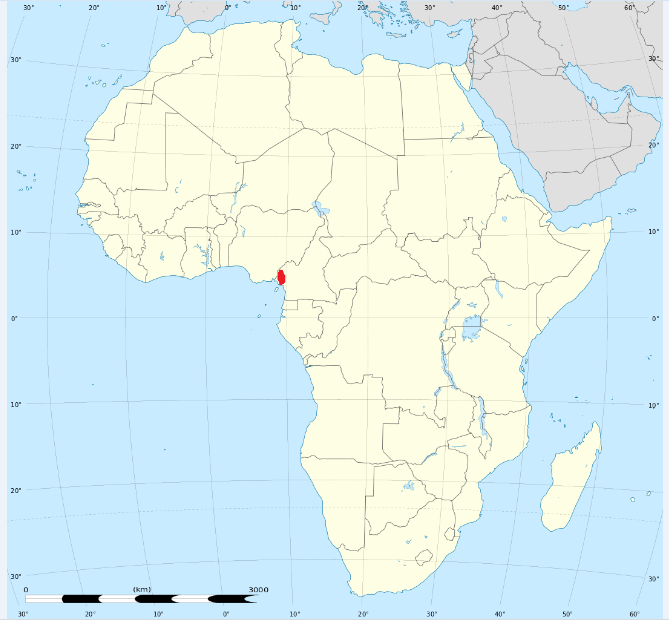
- Range of Cameroon sailfin chameleon

Synonyms
- Chamaeleo montium Buchholz, 1874

= Cameroon sailfin chameleon =

Species of lizard

The Cameroon sailfin chameleon or Cameroon two-horned mountain chameleon (Trioceros montium) is a species of chameleon endemic to Cameroon. It has a very unusual appearance.

== Distribution and habitat ==
The Cameroon sailfin chameleon is found only in the Cameroonian highlands, including Mount Cameroon. Because it is almost entirely restricted to rainforests ranging from 700 to 1,900 m (2,300–6,200 ft) above sea level, it is estimated only a few locations support populations of the species. However, it has also been found in small farms and gardens.

== Description ==
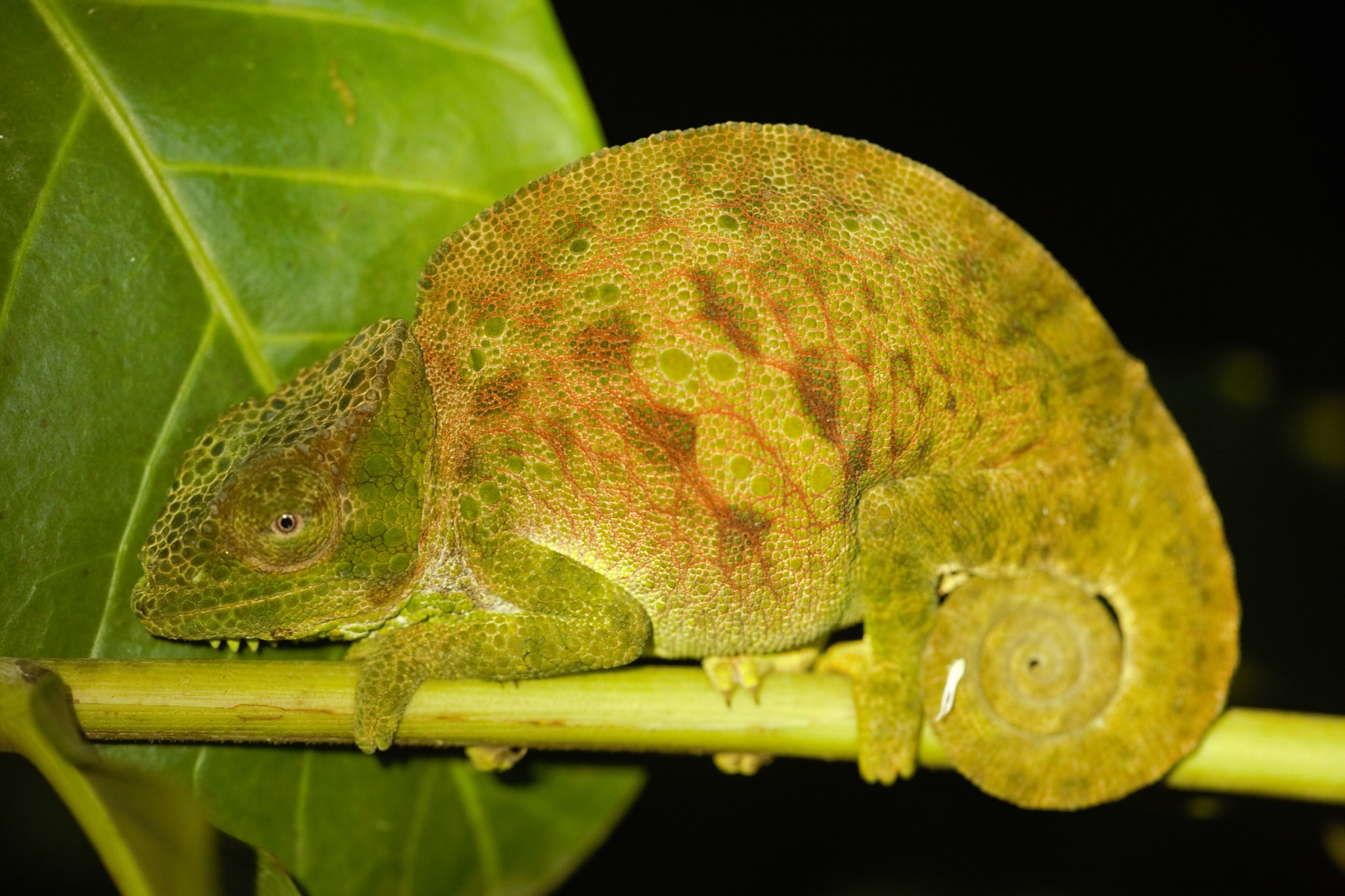
The female lack horns and distinct dorsal "sail"

Cameroon sailfin chameleons usually are greenish with markings in various other colors, but commonly are brown when stressed, and males often turn bluish when displaying. Distinguishing features on males include two large horns just above the upper jaw which are used for jousting and a prominent dorsal "sail". The males can grow up to 25 cm (10 in) long and the females can grow up to 20 cm (8 in) long.
