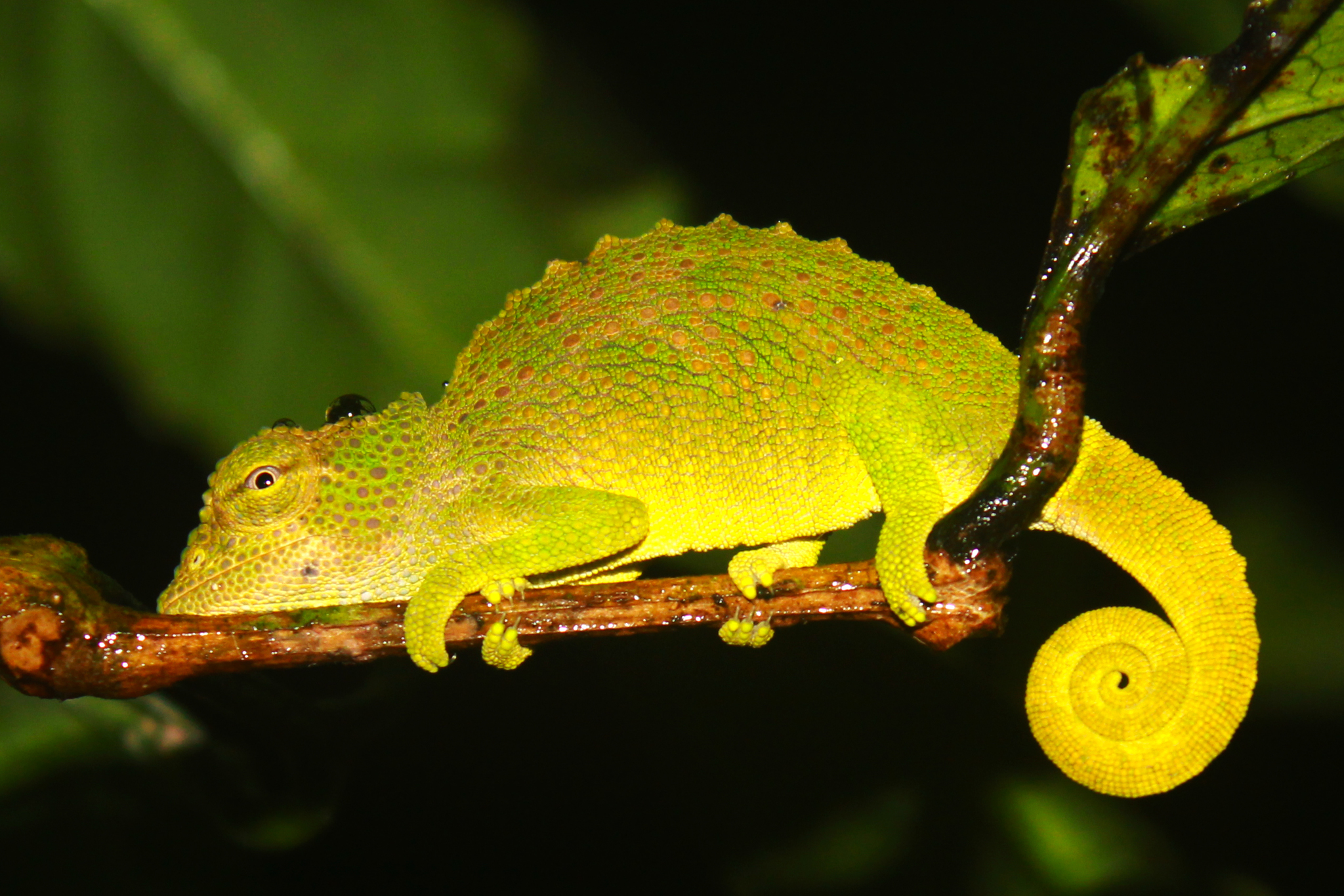

Conservation status
- Near Threatened (IUCN 3.1)

Scientific classification
- Kingdom: Animalia
- Phylum: Chordata
- Class: Reptilia
- Order: Squamata
- Suborder: Iguania
- Family: Chamaeleonidae
- Genus: Trioceros
- Species: T. feae

Binomial name
- Trioceros feae (Boulenger, 1906)

Synonyms
- Chamaeleon feae Boulenger, 1906; Chamaeleo (Trioceros) feae — Nečas, 1999; Trioceros feae — Tilbury & Tolley, 2009

= Trioceros feae =

Species of lizard

Trioceros feae, also known commonly as the Bioko montane chameleon and Fea's chameleon, is a species of lizard in the family Chamaeleonidae. The species is endemic to the island of Bioko.

== Etymology ==
The specific name, feae, is in honor of Leonardo Fea, who was an Italian explorer and naturalist.

== Habitat ==
The preferred natural habitat of T. feae is forest, at altitudes of 1,300–1,600 m (4,300–5,200 ft).

== Reproduction ==
T. feae is oviparous.
