= Trioceros schoutedeni =

Conservation status
- Data Deficient (IUCN 3.1)

Scientific classification
- Kingdom: Animalia
- Phylum: Chordata
- Class: Reptilia
- Order: Squamata
- Suborder: Iguania
- Family: Chamaeleonidae
- Genus: Trioceros
- Species: T. schoutedeni

Binomial name
- Trioceros schoutedeni (Laurent, 1952)

Species of lizard

Trioceros schoutedeni, Schouteden's montane dwarf chameleon, is a species of chameleon found in Rwanda and Democratic Republic of the Congo.
