= Trioceros chapini =

Conservation status
- Least Concern (IUCN 3.1)

Scientific classification
- Kingdom: Animalia
- Phylum: Chordata
- Class: Reptilia
- Order: Squamata
- Suborder: Iguania
- Family: Chamaeleonidae
- Genus: Trioceros
- Species: T. chapini

Binomial name
- Trioceros chapini (de Witte, 1964)

Synonyms
- Chamaeleo chapini de Witte, 1964; Chamaeleo (Trioceros) chapini — Nečas, 1999; Trioceros chapini — Tilbury & Tolley, 2009

Species of lizard

Trioceros chapini, also known commonly as Chapin's chameleon, the gray chameleon, and the grey chameleon, is a species of lizard in the family Chamaeleonidae. The species is native to Central Africa.

== Etymology ==
The specific name, chapini, is in honor of American ornithologist James Paul Chapin.

== Geographic range ==
T. chapini is found in the Democratic Republic of the Congo and Gabon.

== Habitat ==
The preferred natural habitat of T. chapini is forest.

== Reproduction ==
The mode of reproduction of T. chapini is unknown.
