= Trioceros nyirit =

Conservation status
- Least Concern (IUCN 3.1)
- CITES Appendix II

Scientific classification
- Kingdom: Animalia
- Phylum: Chordata
- Class: Reptilia
- Order: Squamata
- Suborder: Iguania
- Family: Chamaeleonidae
- Genus: Trioceros
- Species: T. nyirit

Binomial name
- Trioceros nyirit Stipala, Lutzmann, Malonza, Borghesio, Wilkinson, Godley, & Evans, 2011

Species of lizard

Trioceros nyirit, the Mount Mtelo stump-nosed chameleon or Pokot chameleon, is a species of chameleon endemic to Kenya.
