= Trioceros serratus =

Conservation status
- Vulnerable (IUCN 3.1)

Scientific classification
- Kingdom: Animalia
- Phylum: Chordata
- Class: Reptilia
- Order: Squamata
- Suborder: Iguania
- Family: Chamaeleonidae
- Genus: Trioceros
- Species: T. serratus

Binomial name
- Trioceros serratus (Mertens, 1922)

Species of lizard

Trioceros serratus is a species of chameleon found in Cameroon.
