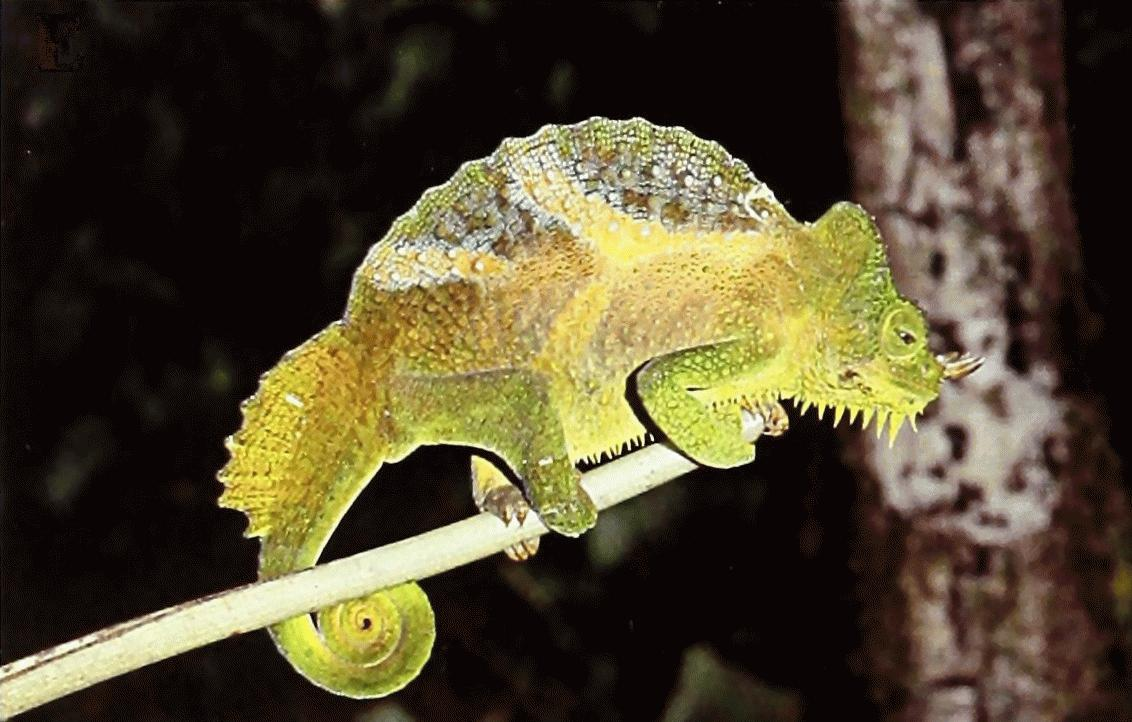
- A four-horned chameleon from Mount Kupe in Cameroon

Conservation status
- Vulnerable (IUCN 3.1)

Scientific classification
- Kingdom: Animalia
- Phylum: Chordata
- Class: Reptilia
- Order: Squamata
- Suborder: Iguania
- Family: Chamaeleonidae
- Genus: Trioceros
- Species: T. quadricornis

Binomial name
- Trioceros quadricornis (Tornier, 1899)
- A map illustrating highland areas of the Cameroon line, including some of those inhabited by the four-horned chameleon

Synonyms
- Chamaeleo quadricornis Tornier, 1899; Chamaeleo (Trioceros) quadricornis — Klaver & Böhme, 1986; Trioceros quadricornis — Tilbury & Tolley, 2009

= Four-horned chameleon =

Species of lizard

The four-horned chameleon (Trioceros quadricornis) is a species of chameleon, a lizard in the family Chamaeleonidae. The species is native to highland areas in western Cameroon and southeastern Nigeria.

== Taxonomy and subspecies ==
The four-horned chameleon was first described in 1899 by German naturalist Gustav Tornier. There are three subspecies, including the nominate race, which are recognized as being valid.

- T. q. quadricornis (Tornier, 1899) – southern four-horned chameleon
- T. q. eisentrauti (Mertens, 1968) – Eisentraut's chameleon
- T. q. gracilior (Böhme & Klaver, 1981) – northern four-horned chameleon

Nota bene: A trinomial authority in parentheses indicates that the subspecies was originally described in a genus other than Trioceros.

== Etymology ==
The subspecific name, eisentrauti, is in honor of German zoologist Martin Eisentraut.

== Distribution and habitat ==
The four-horned chameleon is found only in some highland areas associated with the Cameroon line across Cameroon and eastern Nigeria; its range includes the Western High Plateau, the Bamboutos massif, Mount Manengouba, Oku Massif, the Bakossi Mountains including Mount Kupe, and the Obudu Plateau in Nigeria. T. q. eisentrauti in particular is endemic to the Rumpi Hills of Cameroon. Overall, T. quadricornis has an extent of occurrence of 13,300 km2 (5,135 sq mi) and an inferred area of occupancy of 1,000 km2 (386 sq mi). The species is primarily associated with relatively intact montane forest with limited human activity, where it has a relatively restricted elevational range of 1,150–2,400 m (3,770–7,870 ft). Research suggests that this is likely to reflect competition with other chameleon species rather than physiological tolerances. The type locality for the species is Mount Manegouba in Cameroon.

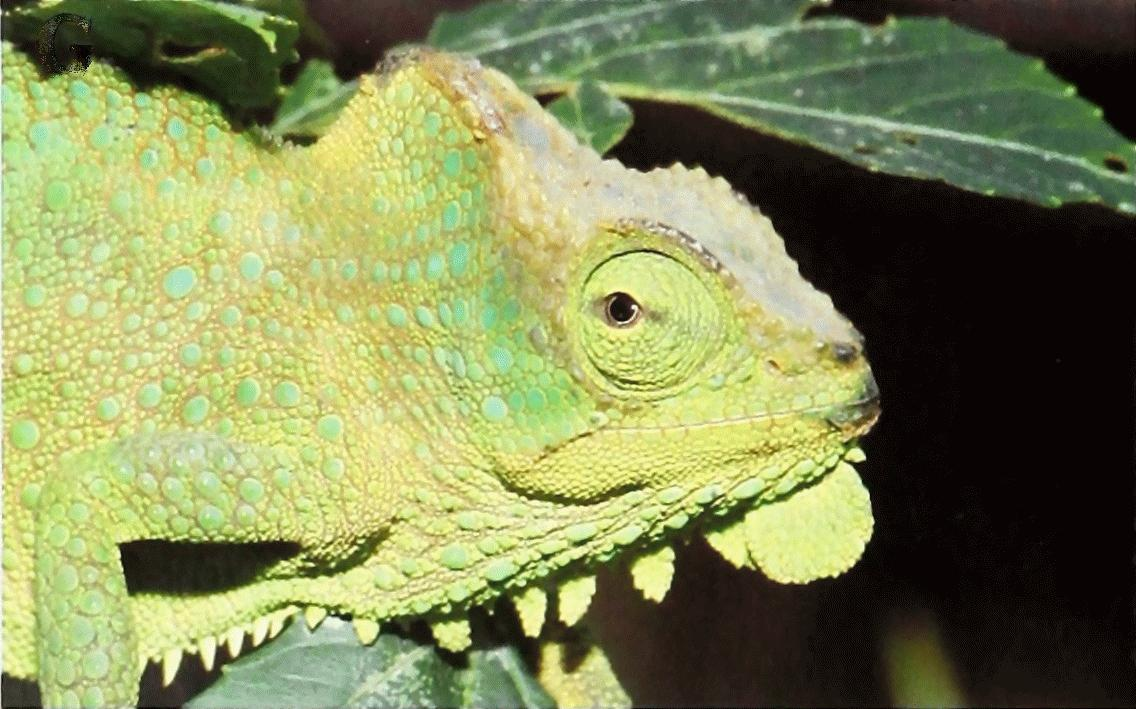
A female four-horned chameleon of the subspecies T. q. eisentrauti

== Description and behavior ==
Like many other chameleons, the four-horned chameleon has a prehensile tail and single claws on its toes. It usually has four prominent horns, but sometimes two are present with up to four adjacent reduced horns; adults typically grow to a total length (including tail) of 10–14 in (25–36 cm). Male four-horned chameleons have a prominent hemipenal bulge and a gular beard, while some female four-horned chameleons have one horn or even two horns on the tip of the snout. The species almost exclusively feeds on arthropods.

== Conservation and threats ==
Because of its small and fragmented range coupled with numerous threats to its population, the four-horned chameleon is ranked Vulnerable by the International Union for Conservation of Nature. There are concerns that logging and agricultural expansion may contribute to deforestation and potentially threaten the status of the species by degrading its habitat; in addition, despite its status as a protected Class A species in Cameroon, its intensive exploitation by the pet trade has caused significant population declines in some cases.
