= Trioceros hanangensis =

Conservation status
- Near Threatened (IUCN 3.1)

Scientific classification
- Kingdom: Animalia
- Phylum: Chordata
- Class: Reptilia
- Order: Squamata
- Suborder: Iguania
- Family: Chamaeleonidae
- Genus: Trioceros
- Species: T. hanangensis

Binomial name
- Trioceros hanangensis Krause & Böhme, 2010

Species of lizard

Trioceros hanangensis, the Mount Hanang dwarf chameleon or Mount Hanang chameleon, is a species of chameleon found in Tanzania.
