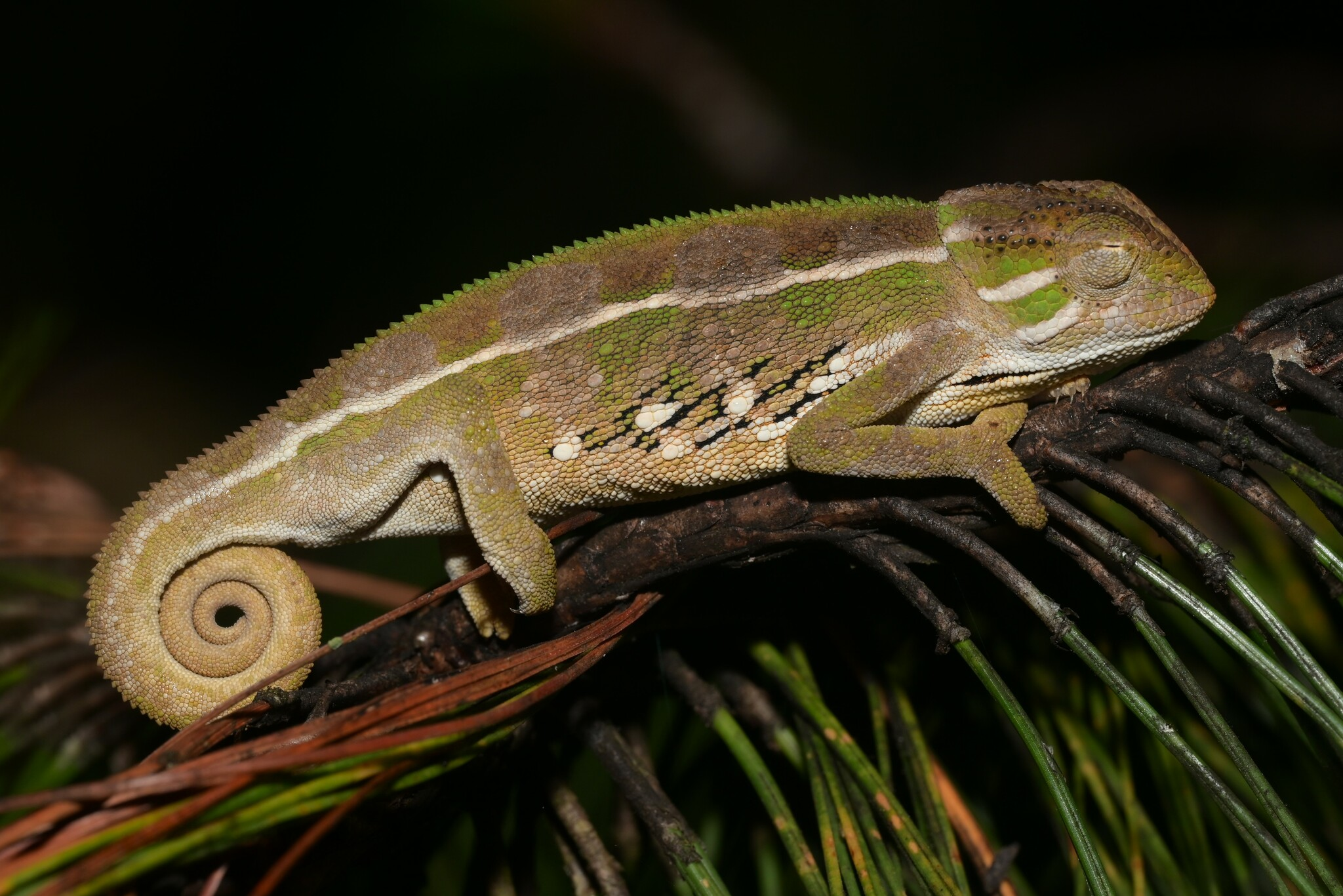
- Ilolo chameleon

Conservation status
- Least Concern (IUCN 3.1)

Scientific classification
- Kingdom: Animalia
- Phylum: Chordata
- Class: Reptilia
- Order: Squamata
- Suborder: Iguania
- Family: Chamaeleonidae
- Genus: Trioceros
- Species: T. goetzei

Binomial name
- Trioceros goetzei (Tornier, 1899)

= Trioceros goetzei =

Species of lizard

Trioceros goetzei, also known commonly as Goetze's chameleon, Goetze's whistling chameleon, and the Ilolo chameleon, is a species of lizard in the family Chamaeleonidae. The species is native to eastern Africa. There are two recognized subspecies.

== Etymology ==
The specific name, goetzei, is in honor of German botanist Walther Goetze.

== Geographic range ==
T. goetzei is found in Malawi and Tanzania.

== Subspecies ==
Two subspecies are recognized as being valid, including the nominotypical subspecies.

- Trioceros goetzei goetzi (Tornier, 1899)
- Trioceros goetzei nyikae (Loveridge, 1953)

Nota bene: A trinomial authority in parentheses indicates that the subspecies was originally described in a genus other than Trioceros.
