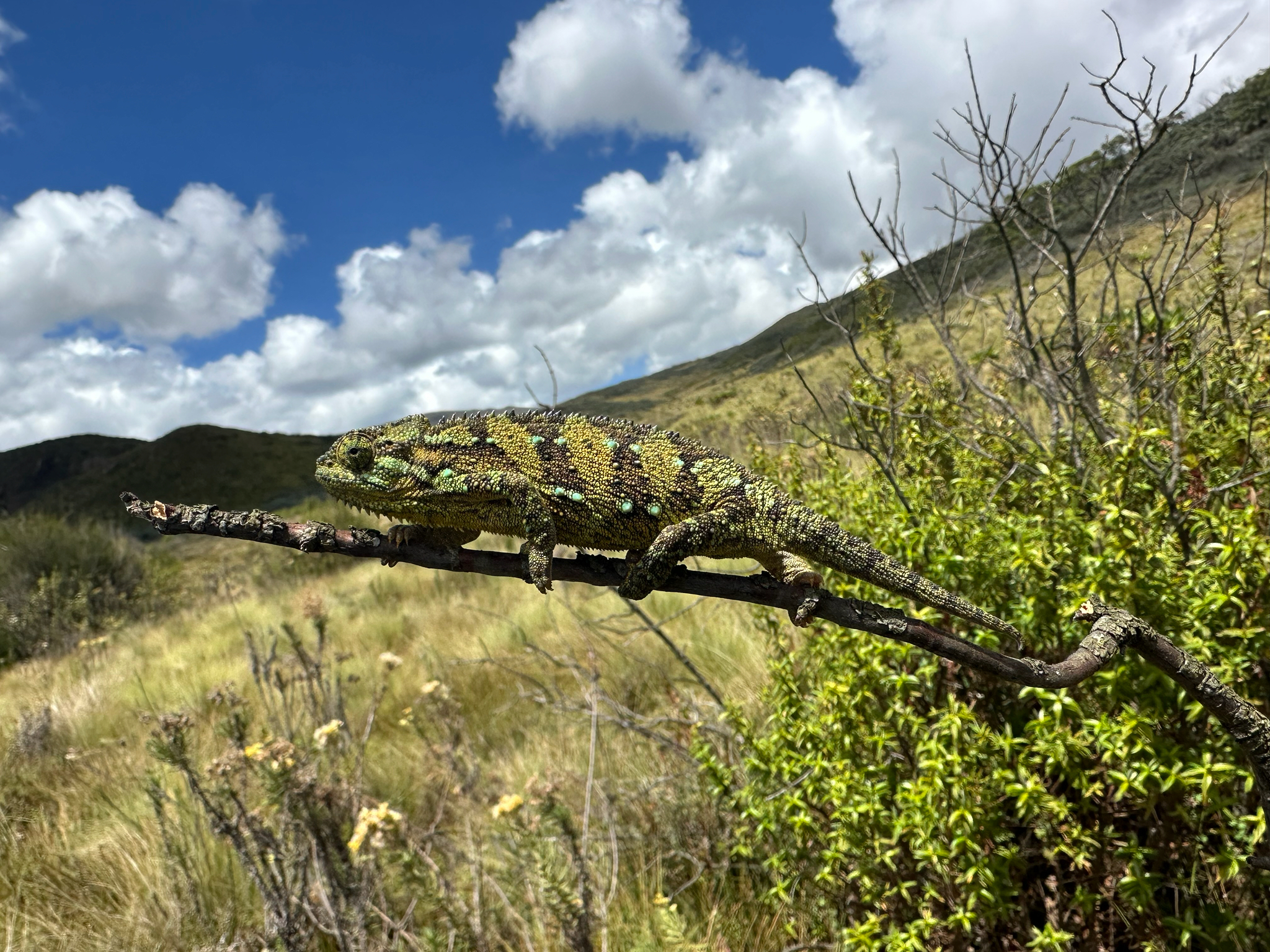
- Trioceros kinangopensis

Conservation status
- Near Threatened (IUCN 3.1)

Scientific classification
- Kingdom: Animalia
- Phylum: Chordata
- Class: Reptilia
- Order: Squamata
- Suborder: Iguania
- Family: Chamaeleonidae
- Genus: Trioceros
- Species: T. kinangopensis

Binomial name
- Trioceros kinangopensis Stipala, Lutzmann, Malonza, Wilkinson, Godley, Nyamache, & Evans, 2012

= Trioceros kinangopensis =

Species of lizard

Trioceros kinangopensis, the Aberdare Mountains dwarf chameleon, is a species of chameleon found in Kenya.
