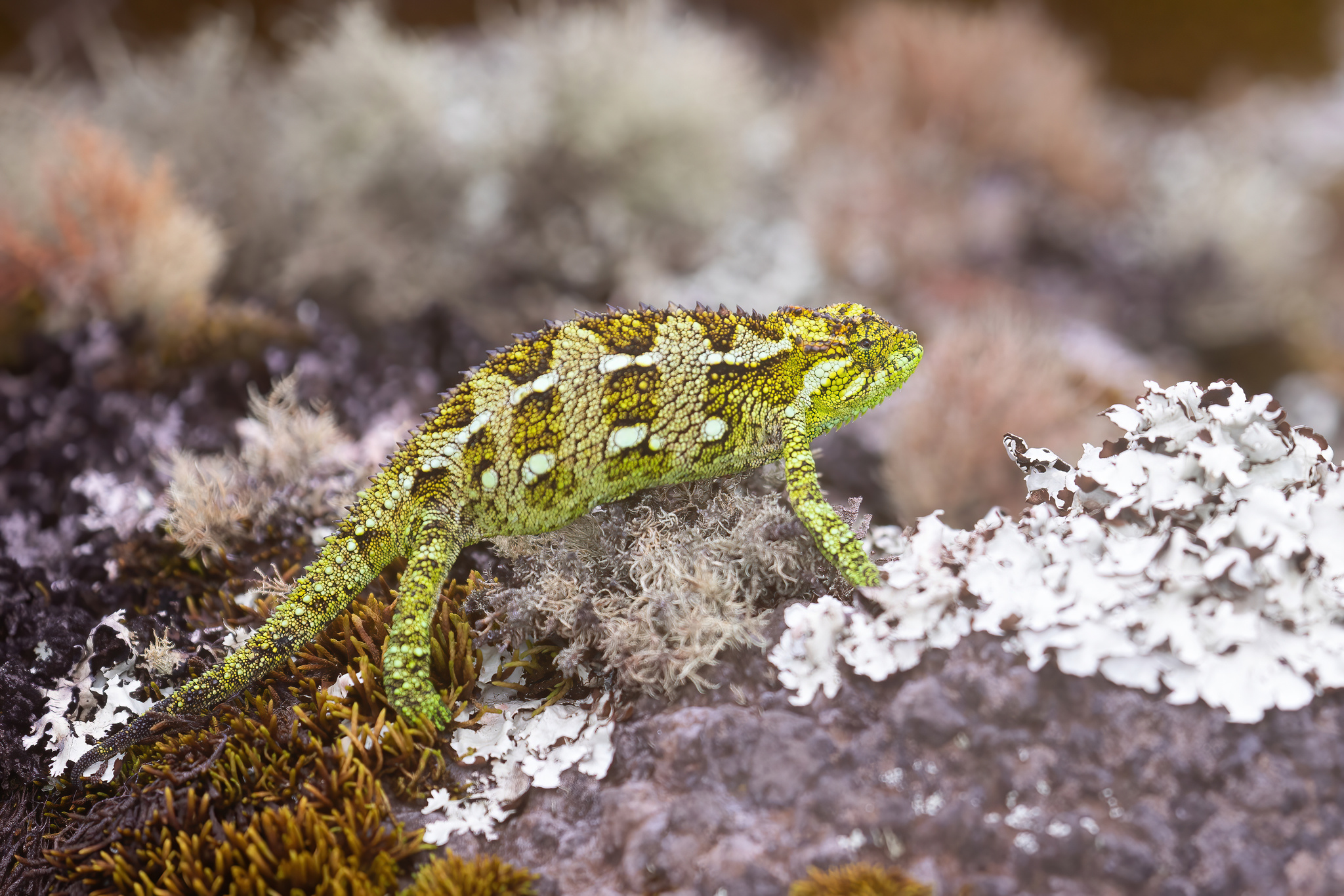

Conservation status
- Near Threatened (IUCN 3.1)

Scientific classification
- Kingdom: Animalia
- Phylum: Chordata
- Class: Reptilia
- Order: Squamata
- Suborder: Iguania
- Family: Chamaeleonidae
- Genus: Trioceros
- Species: T. schubotzi

Binomial name
- Trioceros schubotzi (Sternfeld, 1912)

Synonyms
- Chamaeleo schubotzi Sternfeld, 1912

= Trioceros schubotzi =

Mt. Kenya side-striped chameleon

Species of chameleon

Trioceros schubotzi, the Mt. Kenya side-striped chameleon or Mt Kenya dwarf chameleon is a species of chameleon that was found on Mt. Kenya and originally regarded as a lectotype designation. The locality of this species can be confirmed to Mt. Kenya.
