= Trioceros perreti =

Conservation status
- Endangered (IUCN 3.1)

Scientific classification
- Kingdom: Animalia
- Phylum: Chordata
- Class: Reptilia
- Order: Squamata
- Suborder: Iguania
- Family: Chamaeleonidae
- Genus: Trioceros
- Species: T. perreti

Binomial name
- Trioceros perreti (Klaver & Böhme, 1992)

Synonyms
- Chamaeleo (Trioceros) wiedersheimi perreti Klaver & Böhme, 1992; Chamaeleo wiedersheimi perreti Klaver & Böhme, 1992; Chamaeleo perreti Klaver & Böhme, 1992

Species of lizard

Trioceros perreti, also known commonly as Perret's chameleon and Perret's montane chameleon, is a species of lizard in the family Chamaeleonidae. The species is endemic to Cameroon.

== Etymology ==
The specific name, perreti, is in honor of Swiss herpetologist Jean-Luc Perret.

== Habitat ==
The preferred natural habitats of Trioceros perreti are forest, shrubland, and grassland, at elevations of 1,400–2,400 m (4,600–7,900 ft), but it is also found in disturbed or artificial habitats such as farm lands.

== Reproduction ==
Trioceros perreti is oviparous.
