= Trioceros narraioca =

Conservation status
- Near Threatened (IUCN 3.1)

Scientific classification
- Kingdom: Animalia
- Phylum: Chordata
- Class: Reptilia
- Order: Squamata
- Suborder: Iguania
- Family: Chamaeleonidae
- Genus: Trioceros
- Species: T. narraioca

Binomial name
- Trioceros narraioca (Necas, Modry, & Slapeta, 2003)

Species of lizard

Trioceros narraioca, the Mount Kulal chameleon or Mount Kulal stump-nosed chameleon, is a species of chameleon endemic to Kenya.
