= Trioceros fuelleborni =

Conservation status
- Least Concern (IUCN 3.1)

Scientific classification
- Kingdom: Animalia
- Phylum: Chordata
- Class: Reptilia
- Order: Squamata
- Suborder: Iguania
- Family: Chamaeleonidae
- Genus: Trioceros
- Species: T. fuelleborni

Binomial name
- Trioceros fuelleborni (Tornier, 1900)

Synonyms
- Chamaeleon fülleborni Tornier, 1900; Chamaeleo (Trioceros) fuelleborni — Nečas, 1999; Trioceros fuelleborni — Tilbury & Tolley, 2009

Species of lizard

Trioceros fuelleborni, also known commonly as the flapjack chameleon, the Ngosi Volcano chameleon, and the Poroto three-horned chameleon, is a species of lizard in the family Chamaeleonidae. The species is endemic to Tanzania.

== Etymology ==
The specific name, fuelleborni, is in honor of Prussian-born physician Friedrich Fülleborn, who worked in Tanganyika (now Tanzania) from 1896 to 1900.

== Geographic range ==
T. fuelleborni is found in southwestern Tanzania in the Poroto Mountains and on volcanoes of the Rungwe Volcanic Province.

== Habitat ==
The preferred natural habitat of T. fuelleborni is forest, at altitudes of 2,200–2,500 m (7,200–8,200 ft), but it has also been found in trees and bushes in suburban areas near forest.

== Reproduction ==
T. fuelleborni is ovoviviparous.
