= Trioceros sternfeldi =

Conservation status
- Least Concern (IUCN 3.1)

Scientific classification
- Kingdom: Animalia
- Phylum: Chordata
- Class: Reptilia
- Order: Squamata
- Suborder: Iguania
- Family: Chamaeleonidae
- Genus: Trioceros
- Species: T. sternfeldi

Binomial name
- Trioceros sternfeldi (Rand, 1963)

Species of lizard

Trioceros sternfeldi, the Crater Highlands side-striped chameleon or Tanzanian montane dwarf chameleon, is a species of chameleon found in Tanzania.
