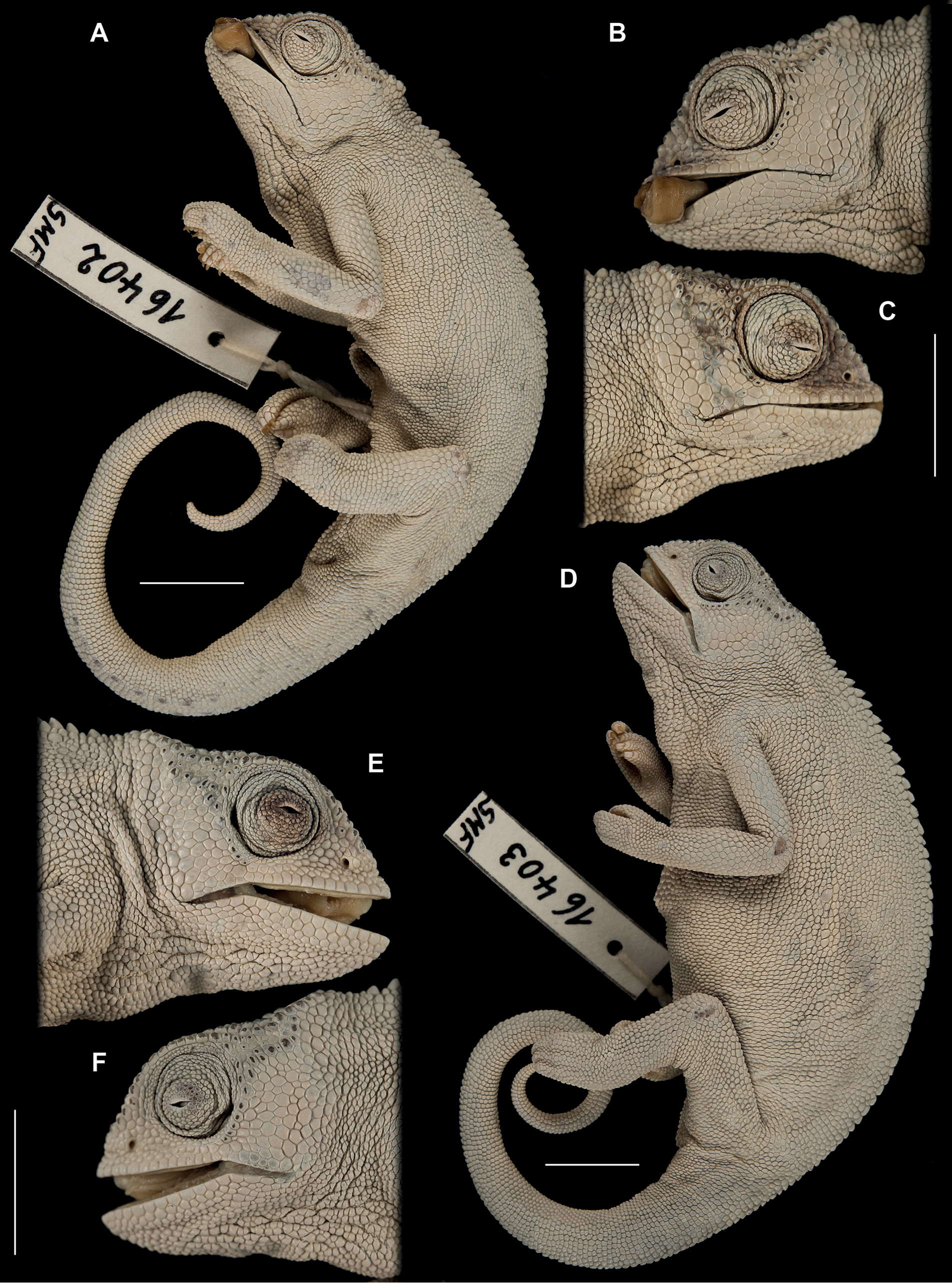

Conservation status
- Least Concern (IUCN 3.1)

Scientific classification
- Kingdom: Animalia
- Phylum: Chordata
- Class: Reptilia
- Order: Squamata
- Suborder: Iguania
- Family: Chamaeleonidae
- Genus: Trioceros
- Species: T. affinis

Binomial name
- Trioceros affinis (Rüppell, 1845)

= Trioceros affinis =

Species of lizard

Trioceros affinis, Rüppell's desert chameleon or beardless Ethiopian montane chameleon, is a species of chameleon endemic to Ethiopia.
