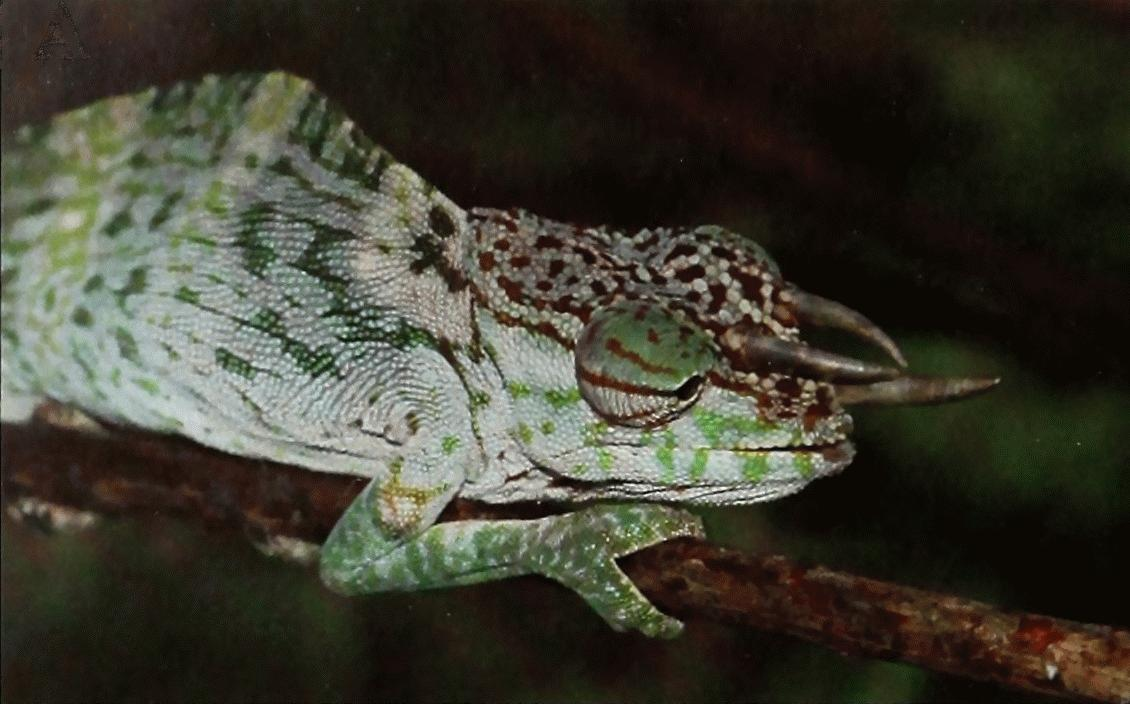
- male

Conservation status
- Least Concern (IUCN 3.1)

Scientific classification
- Kingdom: Animalia
- Phylum: Chordata
- Class: Reptilia
- Order: Squamata
- Suborder: Iguania
- Family: Chamaeleonidae
- Genus: Trioceros
- Species: T. oweni

Binomial name
- Trioceros oweni (Gray, 1831)
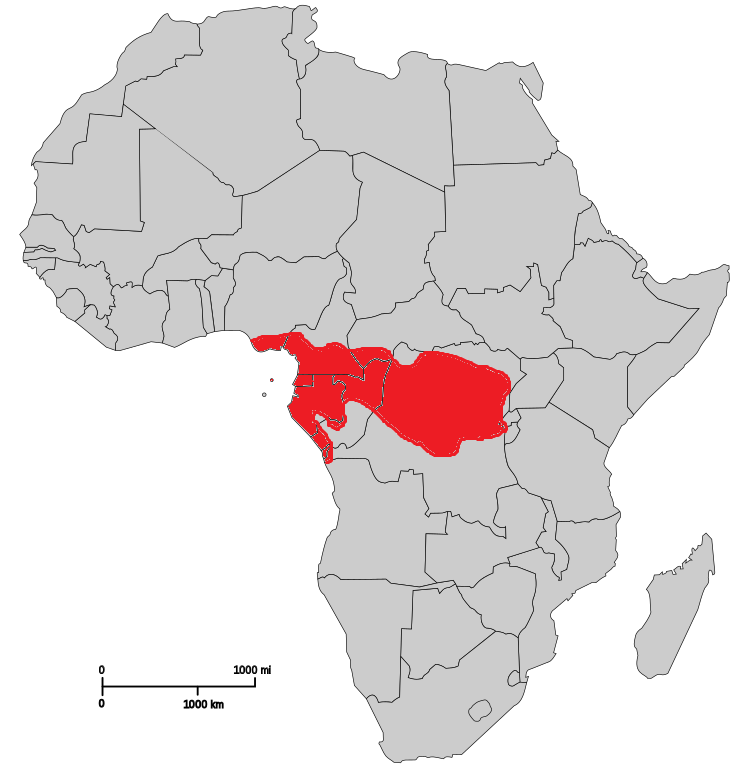
- A map illustrating the range of Owen's chameleon

Synonyms
- Chameleo oweni Gray, 1831; Chamaeleo tricornis A.M.C. Duméril & Bibron, 1836; Chamaeleo bibroni Martin, 1838; Chamaeleo grayii Swainson, 1839; Triceras owenii — Gray, 1865; Chamaeleo unicornis Mocquard, 1906; Chamaeleo michelli L. Müller, 1913; Chamaeleo (Trioceros) oweni — Klaver & Böhme, 1986; Trioceros oweni — Tilbury & Tolley, 2009

= Owen's chameleon =

Species of lizard

Owen's chameleon (Trioceros oweni), also commonly known as Owen's three-horned chameleon, is a species of lizard in the family Chamaeleonidae. The species is native to forests in central Africa. Named after British naval officer and explorer William Fitzwilliam Owen, it was first described in 1831 by the naturalist John Edward Gray, and is the type species of the genus Trioceros.

== Distribution and habitat ==
Owen's chameleon can be found in much of tropical central Africa, from the Niger Delta in Nigeria in the north, to Angola in the south, and Burundi in the east. It inhabits dense evergreen and semi-deciduous forests at altitudes lower than 800 m (2,600 ft) above sea level, usually living in large trees. The type locality for the species is the island of Bioko in Equatorial Guinea.

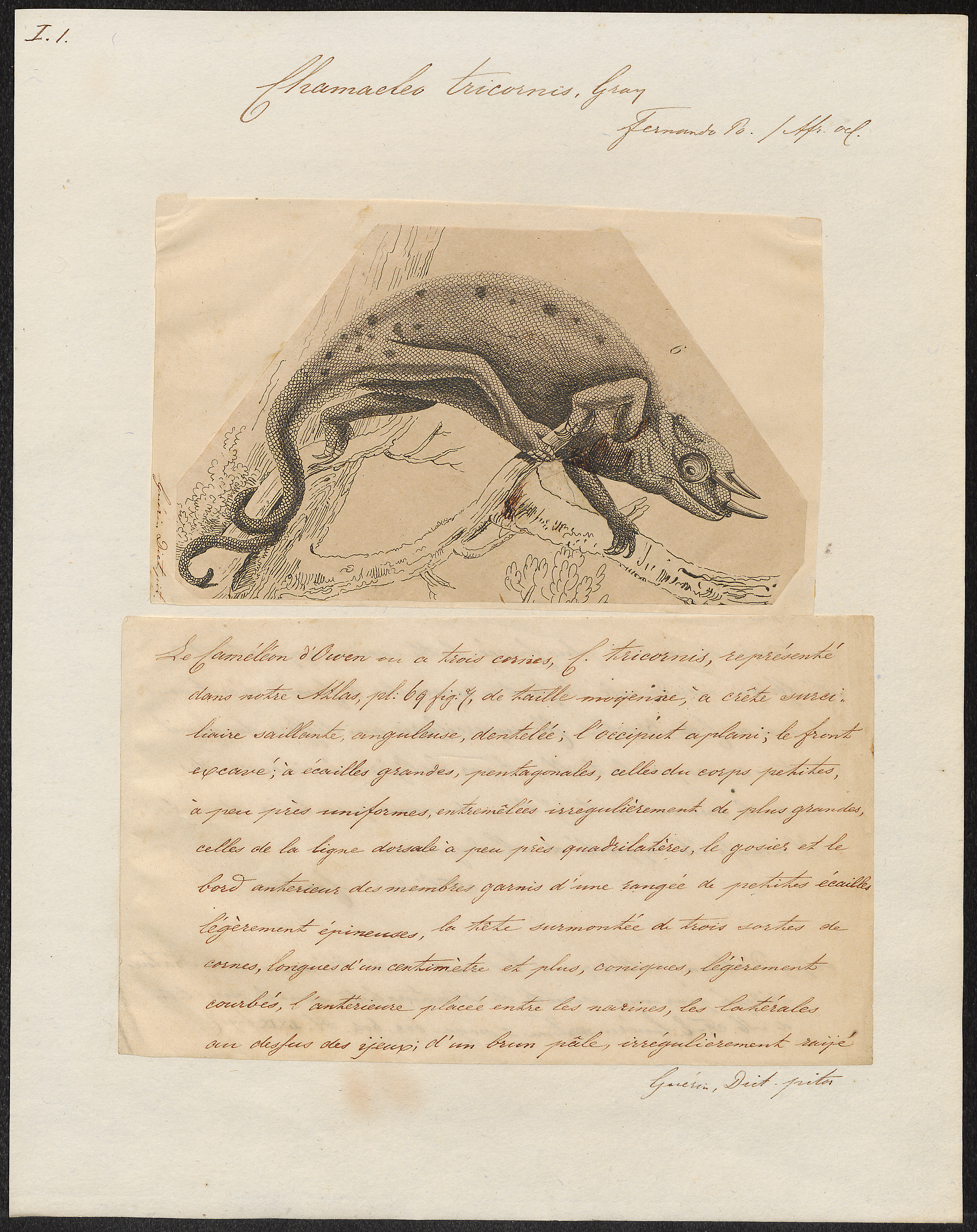
A 19th century illustration of Owen's chameleon

== Description and behavior ==
Like many other chameleons, Owen's chameleon has a prehensile tail and a single claw on each toe. Males have three smooth horns, while females lack horns but have loose skin on their hind legs that gives the impression of wearing baggy trousers. On average, adult Owen's chameleons range from 25 to 28 centimetres (9.8 to 11 inches) in total length (tail included), while a typical weight is around 75 grams (2.6 ounces). The species is generally arboreal and will leap from branch to branch or to the ground in order to avoid predators; it tends to feed on insects and other arthropods.

== Reproduction ==
Trioceros oweni is oviparous.

== Conservation and threats ==
Because of its wide range, abundance, and population stability, Owen's chameleon is ranked Least Concern by the International Union for Conservation of Nature. However, there are concerns that logging and agricultural expansion may contribute to deforestation and potentially threaten the status of the species. In addition, it is occasionally exploited via the pet trade or traded locally to be used in traditional medicine; some tribes in the Democratic Republic of the Congo believe that scorched body of an Owen's chameleon can be used as a protective talisman, while around Yaounde in Cameroon the species is utilized as a treatment for maladies believed to be magical.
