= Trioceros harennae =

Conservation status
- Least Concern (IUCN 3.1)

Scientific classification
- Kingdom: Animalia
- Phylum: Chordata
- Class: Reptilia
- Order: Squamata
- Suborder: Iguania
- Family: Chamaeleonidae
- Genus: Trioceros
- Species: T. harennae

Binomial name
- Trioceros harennae (Largen, 1995)

Synonyms
- Chamaeleo harennae Largen, 1995

Species of lizard

Trioceros harennae, also known commonly as the Harenna hornless chameleon, is a species of lizard in the family Chamaeleonidae. The species is endemic to Ethiopia. There are two recognized subspecies.

== Etymology ==
The specific name, harennae, refers to the Harenna escarpment in the Bale Mountains of Ethiopia. The subspecific name, fitchi, is in honor of Free Methodist minister Stephen Fitch who was one of the collectors of the holotype.

== Geographic range ==
T. harennae is native to the Bale Mountains in the regional state of Oromia in Ethiopia.

== Habitat ==
The preferred natural habitats of T. harennae are forest and shrubland (above treeline), at altitudes of 2,400–3,300 m (7,900–10,800 ft).

== Description ==
T. harennae may attain a total length (including tail) of 13.8 cm (5.4 in).

== Reproduction ==
The mode of reproduction of T. harennae has been described as viviparous and as ovoviviparous. Litter size is 8–12.

== Subspecies ==
Two subspecies are recognized as being valid, including the nominotypical subspecies.

- Trioceros harenae harennae (Largen, 1995)
- Trioceros harennae fitchi (Nečas, 2004)

Nota bene: A trinomial authority in parentheses indicates that the subspecies was originally described in a genus other than Trioceros.
