= James Chapin =

American ornithologist (1889–1964)

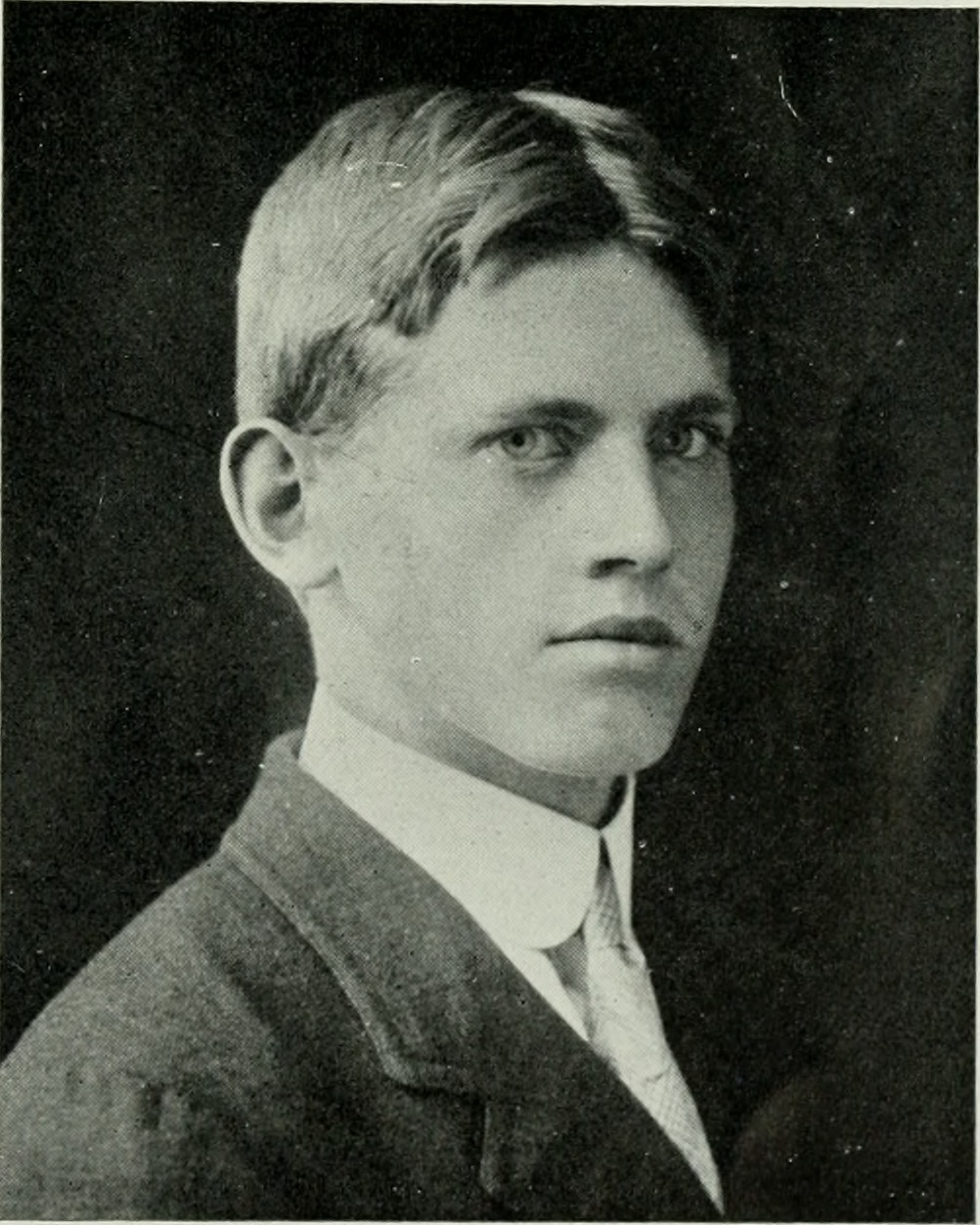
- Born: James Paul Chapin; 9 July 1889
- Died: 5 April 1964 (aged 74)
- Education: Columbia University (BA, MA, PhD)

James Paul Chapin (July 9, 1889 – April 5, 1964) was an American ornithologist and curator of the American Museum of Natural History.

== Biography ==
Chapin is one of the highest-regarded ornithologists of the twentieth century. He was joint leader (with Herbert Lang) of the Lang–Chapin expedition, which made a biological survey of the Belgian Congo between 1909 and 1915. For his work The Birds of the Belgian Congo, Part I, he was awarded the Daniel Giraud Elliot Medal from the National Academy of Sciences in 1932. He received a bachelor's degree in 1916, Awhere he was a member of the Philolexian Society, a master's degree in 1917, and a doctorate in 1932, all from Columbia University, and then began a lengthy career at the American Museum of Natural History.

Chapin served as the 17th president of The Explorers Club from 1949 to 1950.

=== Intelligence officer in the Congo ===
In 1942, Chapin was recruited by the Office of Strategic Services intelligence agency as an intelligence officer. Under the cover of special assistant to the US consul based in Léopoldville, Chapin took the code name CRISP and reported back military and economic information. According to Susan Williams, he was "evidently more comfortable bird-watching than spy-watching" and was withdrawn from the Congo after a while. He was then admitted at a psychiatric clinic, was finally discharged in September 1943 and went back home. He resumed his functions at the American Museum of Natural History in October 1943.

== Legacy ==
Chapin is commemorated in the scientific names of three species of African reptiles: Ichnotropis chapini, Pelusios chapini, and Trioceros chapini. Chapin returned to the Belgian Congo in 1953 to continue fieldwork which he had started more than half a century earlier. When asked about his most famous discovery, he mentioned the Congo peafowl, adding that he had obtained a feather from this hitherto unknown bird from a pygmy on one of his expeditions, but had never seen the bird. It was unknown to science. Years later he was able to identify it as the rare Congo peafowl.
