= Trioceros ituriensis =

Conservation status
- Least Concern (IUCN 3.1)

Scientific classification
- Kingdom: Animalia
- Phylum: Chordata
- Class: Reptilia
- Order: Squamata
- Suborder: Iguania
- Family: Chamaeleonidae
- Genus: Trioceros
- Species: T. ituriensis

Binomial name
- Trioceros ituriensis Schmidt, 1919

Species of lizard

Trioceros ituriensis, the Ituri forest chameleon, is a species of chameleon found in Democratic Republic of the Congo and Kenya.
