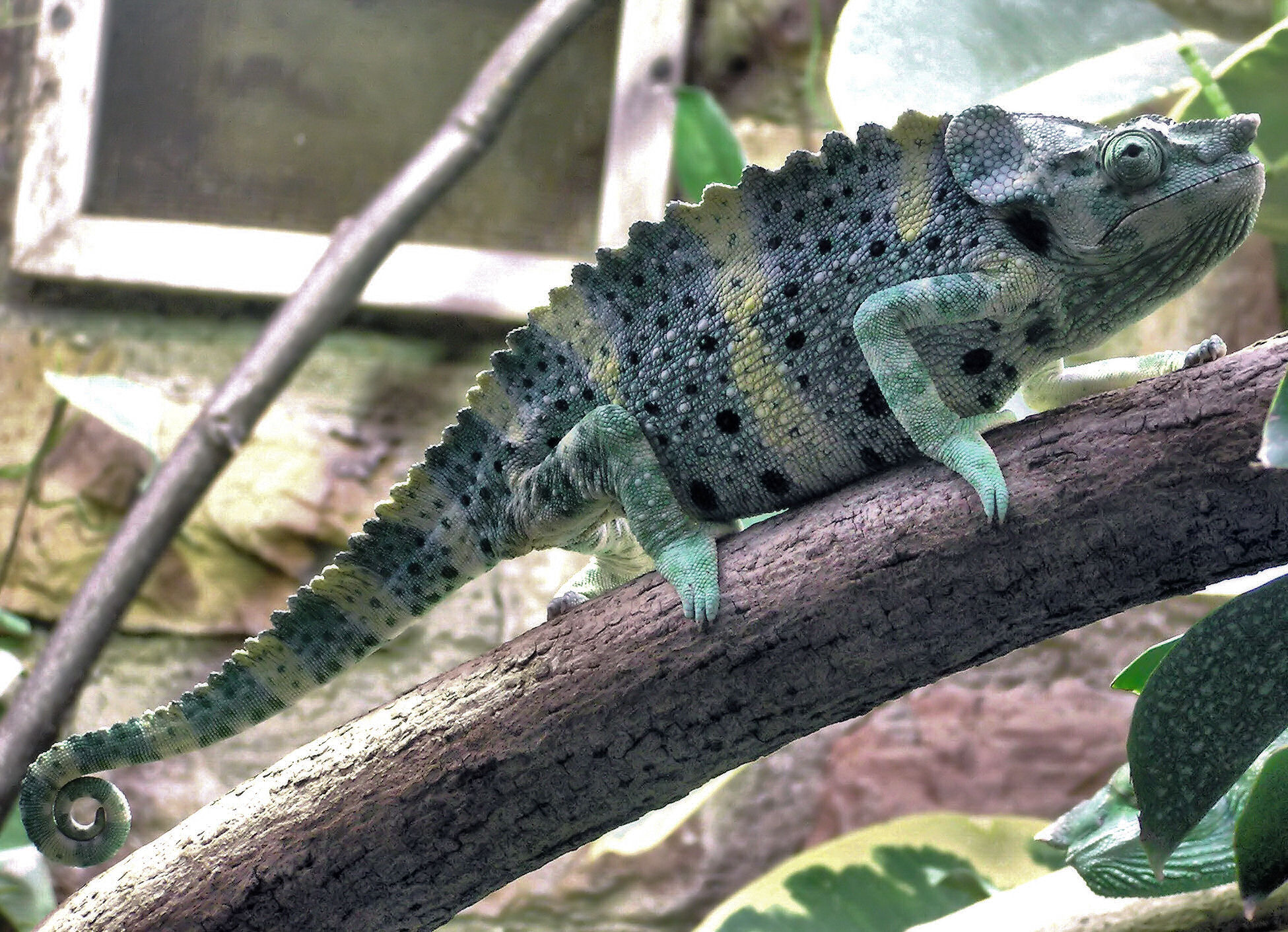
- Trioceros melleri

Conservation status
- Least Concern (IUCN 3.1)

Scientific classification
- Kingdom: Animalia
- Phylum: Chordata
- Class: Reptilia
- Order: Squamata
- Suborder: Iguania
- Family: Chamaeleonidae
- Genus: Trioceros
- Species: T. melleri

Binomial name
- Trioceros melleri (Gray, 1865)

Synonyms
- Ensirostris melleri Gray, 1865; Chamæleon melleri — Boulenger, 1887; Chamaeleo melleri — Loveridge, 1920; Chamaeleo (Trioceros) melleri — Nečas, 1999; Trioceros melleri — Tilbury & Tolley, 2009

= Meller's chameleon =

Species of lizard

Meller's chameleon (Trioceros melleri), also known commonly as the giant one-horned chameleon, is a species of lizard in the family Chamaeleonidae. Meller's chameleon is the largest species of chameleon from the African mainland, i.e., the largest of the chameleons not native to Madagascar.

== Etymology ==
Meller's chameleon gets its common name and specific name from a "Dr. Meller" who is mentioned by biologist and taxon authority John Gray in the section about the habitat of the species in his 1865 description. The "Dr. Meller" to whom Gray dedicated this species was botanist Charles James Meller (1836–1869) who worked in the area that is now Malawi.

== Habitat and geographic distribution ==
Trioceros melleri is relatively common in the bushy savannas and woodlands of East Africa where it can be found in Malawi, northern Mozambique, and Tanzania.

== Description ==
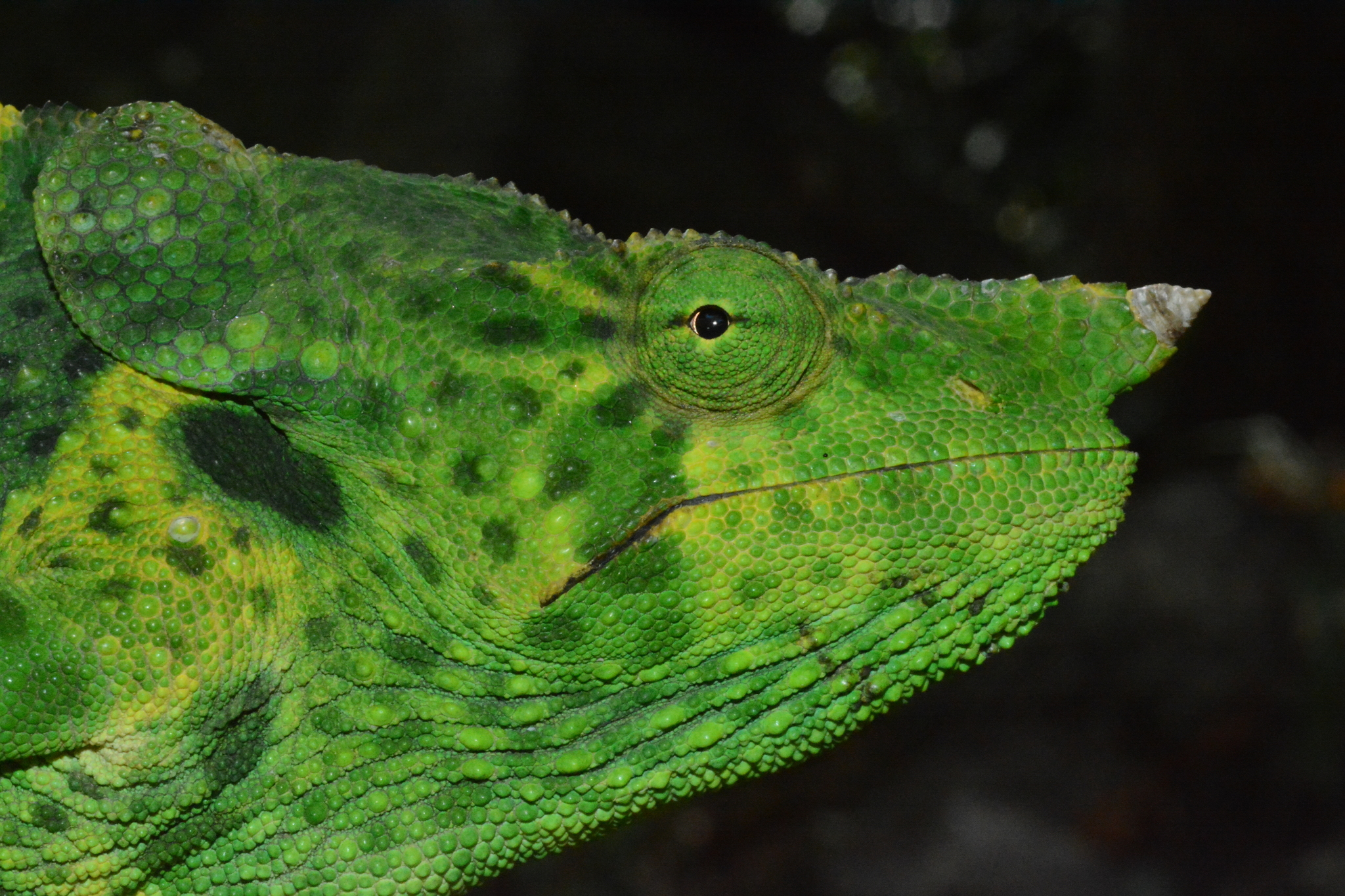
Trioceros melleri, close-up of head

The largest of the chameleons from the African mainland, adult Trioceros melleri generally are 30–61 cm (12–24 in) in total length (tail included) and 300–500 g (11–18 oz) in weight, but exceptionally large individuals have reputedly been up to 76 cm (30 in) in length and 600 g (21 oz) in weight.

Females are generally smaller than males, and have less developed dorsal and medial crests. The head of this species is relatively small in relation to the rest of its body and has a more elongated shape in comparison to other chameleons in its genus.

T. melleri is stout-bodied and has a relatively stubby tail one third the length of its body. A low, scalloped crest extends from just behind the casque of the head through the proximal half of the tail, and a sharp medial crest runs from the lizard's eyes to the tip of its snout, which bears a single small horn. This chameleon bears greatly enlarged occipital lobes. It has heterogeneous scales which vary shape and size to various parts of its body and large, granular scales distributed homogeneously on the trunk and limbs. There are longitudinal rows of large, granular scales in the chameleon's gular region, one of its most distinctive characteristics.

Spots and broad vertical bands on the chameleon's flanks range in color from brown, dark green, yellow or even black. The basic coloration of the creature is a deep forest green with white stripes, but like many chameleons it can change its color depending on various circumstances. If being fed or handled they might display black and white dots. When basking in the sun, the side of their body towards the sunlight can turn dark green or black, while the rest of the animal stays much lighter.

Meller's chameleon has color patterns associated with stress. Mild excitement or stress is indicated by dark spotting overlaying the reptile's normal color. These dark green spots turn to black mottling as the chameleon gets more upset. Severe stress turns the chameleon first charcoal gray, followed by pure white adorned with yellow stripes. A sick Meller's chameleon may be mottled with brown, gray, pink, or white. A gravid animal is black, cream, and gray colored and will be bulging with eggs.

The long tongue can reach prey up to 20 inches (51 cm) away.

== Diet and reproduction ==
Like most chameleons, Meller's chameleon is a strict carnivore, eating insects, smaller lizards, spiders, crickets, worms, and caterpillars. Large specimens have been known to eat small birds.

Females annually produce a single clutch of up to 80 eggs. Newborn Meller's chameleons are about 4 inches (10 cm) in length and in captivity must be fed Drosophilidae and tiny crickets for the first three weeks of their lives. Afterwards, they accept house flies and larger insect prey including crickets, locusts, silkworms, and cockroaches. They may live as long as twelve years.

== Captivity ==
Trioceros melleri specimens vary from timid to moderately aggressive towards humans, with some specimens being reported as friendly. Wild caught specimens of T. melleri have fared poorly in captivity, often imported with heavy parasite loads, they have a high mortality rate. The species has been successfully bred in captivity as long as specific requirements are met and are recommended for advanced hobbyists.

As it is a large species of lizard, a large enclosure is recommended. One breeder recommends placing the chameleon's cage above human eye level so that it can feel elevated in its environment.

High day time temperatures 80–85 °F (27–29 °C) are needed for the reptile's enclosure. Simulating the natural temperature changes of the creature's native environment, a night time temperature of the low 60s Fahrenheit (~16 °C) is recommended as well. Meller's chameleon needs considerable hydration, and various dietary supplements are recommended.
