= List of near threatened reptiles =

- Extinct in the wild (EW): 2 species
- Critically endangered (CR): 432 species
- Endangered (EN): 800 species
- Vulnerable (VU): 627 species
- Near threatened (NT, LR/cd): 566 species
- Least concern (LC): 6,406 species
- Data deficient (DD): 1,502 species
Reptile species (IUCN, 2025.2)
- 10,368 extant species have been evaluated
- 8,866 of those are fully assessed (Note: excludes data deficient evaluations.)
- 6,972 are not threatened at present
- 1,894 to 3,396 are threatened (Note: Threatened comprises CR, EN and VU. Upper estimate additionally includes DD.)
- 34 to 84 are extinct or extinct in the wild:
  - 32 extinct (EX) species (Note: Chart omits extinct (EX) species)
  - 2 extinct in the wild (EW)
  - 50 possibly extinct [CR(PE)]
  - 0 possibly extinct in the wild [CR(PEW)]

Near Threatened (NT) species do not currently qualify for Critically Endangered (CR), Endangered (EN) or Vulnerable (VU), but are likely to qualify for a threatened category in the near future, or are already close to qualifying.

As of September 2016, the International Union for Conservation of Nature (IUCN) lists 329 near threatened reptile species. 6.4% of all evaluated reptile species are listed as near threatened. The IUCN also lists two reptile subspecies as near threatened.

Of the subpopulations of reptiles evaluated by the IUCN, two species subpopulations have been assessed as near threatened.

This is a complete list of near threatened reptile species and subspecies evaluated by the IUCN. Species and subspecies which have near threatened subpopulations (or stocks) are indicated.

== Turtles and tortoises ==
=== Chelidae ===
Austro‑South American side‑necked turtles

- Big-headed pantanal swamp turtle (Acanthochelys macrocephala)
- Brazilian radiolated swamp turtle (Acanthochelys radiolata)
- Black spine-neck swamp turtle (Acanthochelys spixii)
- Northern snake-necked turtle (Chelodina oblonga)
- Parker's snake-necked turtle (Chelodina parkeri)
- Reimann's snake-necked turtle (Chelodina reimanni)
- Vanderhaege's toad-headed turtle (Mesoclemmys vanderhaegei)
- Red side-necked turtle (Rhinemys rufipes)

=== Pelomedusidae ===
African side‑necked turtles

- West African black turtle (Pelusios niger)

=== Emydidae ===
Terrapins

- European pond turtle (Emys orbicularis)
- Barbour's map turtle (Graptemys barbouri)
- Escambia map turtle (Graptemys ernsti)
- Alabama map turtle (Graptemys pulchra)
- Rio Grande cooter (Pseudemys gorzugi)
- Northern red-bellied turtle (Pseudemys rubriventris)
- Ornate box turtle (Terrapene ornata)
- Central Antillean slider (Trachemys stejnegeri)

=== Geoemydidae ===
Box turtles, pond turtles

- Asian leaf turtle (Cyclemys dentata)
- Enigmatic leaf turtle (Cyclemys enigmatica)
- Assam leaf turtle (Cyclemys gemeli)
- Mekong snail-eating turtle (Malayemys subtrijuga)
- Japanese pond turtle (Mauremys japonica)
- Brown roofed turtle (Pangshura smithii)
- Brown wood turtle (Rhinoclemmys annulata)
- Furrowed wood turtle (Rhinoclemmys areolata)
- Spot-legged wood turtle (Rhinoclemmys punctularia)

=== Testudinidae ===
Tortoises

- Tent tortoise (Psammobates tentorius)

=== Cheloniidae ===
Sea turtles

- Loggerhead sea turtle (Caretta caretta) (VU)
  - Southeast Indian Ocean subpopulation
  - Southwest Indian Ocean subpopulation

=== Kinosternidae ===
Mud turtles, musk turtles

- Tabasco mud turtle (Kinosternon acutum)
- Alamos mud turtle (Kinosternon alamosae)
- Striped mud turtle (Kinosternon baurii)
- Durango mud turtle (Kinosternon durangoense)
- Herrera's mud turtle (Kinosternon herrerai)
- Arizona mud turtle (Kinosternon stejnegeri)

== Lizards ==
=== Iguanidae ===
Iguanas and chuckwallas

- Campeche spiny-tailed iguana
- Yellow-backed spiny-tailed iguana

=== Diploglossidae ===
Galliwasps and Ophiodes sp. legless lizards

- Cuban small-eared galliwasp (Diploglossus garridoi)
- Highland galliwasp (Siderolamprus hylaius)

=== Diplodactylidae ===
Diplodactylid geckos

- Gracile bavayia
- Robust forest bavayia
- Pale-stripe bavayia
- Bauer's chameleon gecko
- Large-scaled chameleon gecko
- Vieillard's chameleon gecko
- Gold-striped gecko
- Duvaucel's gecko
- Black-eyed gecko

=== Chamaeleonidae ===
Chameleons

- Drakensberg dwarf chameleon
- Zululand dwarf chameleon
- Setaro's dwarf chameleon
- Natal Midlands dwarf chameleon
- Amber mountain leaf chameleon
- Antakarana leaf chameleon
- Brookesia betschi
- Brookesia brunoi
- Brookesia confidens
- Brookesia griveaudi
- Brookesia micra
- Amber mountain chameleon
- Calumma ambreense
- Calumma guibei
- Calumma marojezense
- Parson's chameleon
- Peltier's chameleon
- Socotran chameleon
- Furcifer timoni
- Mount Nyiro bearded chameleon
- Taita blade-horned chameleon
- Carpenter's chameleon
- Fischer's chameleon
- Sharp-nosed chameleon
- Kilimanjaro blade-horned chameleon
- Strange-nosed chameleon
- Mount Mabu chameleon
- Palleon lolontany
- Mount Mabu pygmy chameleon
- Bale two-horned chameleon
- Bioko montane chameleon
- Mount Hanang chameleon
- Trioceros kinangopensis
- Marsabit one-horned chameleon
- Cameroon sailfin chameleon
- Mount Kulal stump-nosed chameleo
- Mount Kenya dwarf chameleon

=== Anolidae ===
Anoles

- Barahona grass anole (Anolis alumina)
- St. Martin anole (Anolis pogus)
- Blue anole (Anolis gorgonae)
- Solitaire anole (Anolis solitarius)

=== Gekkonidae ===
Common geckos

- Dwarf bronze gecko (Ailuronyx tachyscopaeus)
- Different-scaled day gecko (Cnemaspis heteropholis)
- Ponmudi day gecko (Cnemaspis nairi)
- Nilgiri day gecko (Cnemaspis nilagirica)
- Ornate day gecko (Cnemaspis ornata)
- Sispara day gecko (Cnemaspis sisparensis)
- Cyrtodactylus ayeyarwadyensis
- Sikkimese bent-toed gecko (Cyrtodactylus gubernatoris)
- Palawan bent-toed gecko (Cyrtodactylus redimiculus)
- Cyrtodactylus salomonensis
- Islands striped gecko (Dierogekko insularis)
- Spotted bowfinger gecko (Geckoella triedrus)
- Smooth-scaled narrow-disked gecko (Gekko athymus)
- Small-scaled leaf-toed gecko (Goggia microlepidota)
- Anamalai Hill gecko (Hemidactylus anamallensis)
- Boavista leaf-toed gecko (Hemidactylus boavistensis)
- Grant's leaf-toed gecko (Hemidactylus granti)
- Muller's velvet gecko (Homopholis mulleri)
- Lygodactylus blancae
- Lygodactylus expectatus
- Western dwarf gecko (Lygodactylus guibei)
- Malagasy dwarf gecko (Lygodactylus klemmeri)
- Thin dwarf gecko (Lygodactylus rarus)
- Lygodactylus viscatus
- Tsodilo thick-toed gecko (Pachydactylus tsodiloensis)
- Paroedura ibityensis
- Paroedura maingoka
- Nosy Be ground gecko (Paroedura oviceps)
- Phelsuma berghofi
- Phelsuma dorsivittata
- Phelsuma malamakibo
- Pasteur's day gecko (Phelsuma pasteuri)
- Philippine flying gecko (Ptychozoon intermedium)
- Namaqua day gecko (Rhoptropella ocellata)
- Uroplatus alluaudi
- Uroplatus finiavana

=== Lacertidae ===
Wall lizards

- Bedriaga's fringe-fingered lizard (Acanthodactylus bedriagai)
- Savigny's Fringe-fingered Lizard (Acanthodactylus savignyi)
- White fringe-fingered lizard
- Alpine meadow lizard (Adolfus alleni)
- Western alpine meadow lizard (Adolfus masavaensis)
- Greek algyroides (Algyroides moreoticus)
- Bedriaga's rock lizard (Archaeolacerta bedriagae)
- Atlas dwarf lizard (Atlantolacerta andreanskyi)
- Soutpansberg rock lizard (Australolacerta rupicola)
- Darevskia dahli
- Derjugin's lizard (Darevskia derjugini)
- Ajarian lizard (Darevskia mixta)
- Meadow lizard (Darevskia praticola)
- Unisexual lizard (Darevskia unisexualis)
- Green keel-bellied lizard (Gastropholis prasina)
- Greek rock lizard (Hellenolacerta graeca)
- Pyrenean rock lizard (Iberolacerta bonnali)
- Leonese rock lizard (Iberolacerta galani)
- Horvath's rock lizard (Iberolacerta horvathi)
- Iberian emerald lizard (Lacerta schreiberi)
- Ibiza wall lizard (Podarcis pityusensis)
- Blanc's sand racer (Psammodromus blanci)
- Ocellated lizard (Timon lepidus)
- Cottrell's mountain lizard (Tropidosaura cottrelli)

=== Scincidae ===
Skinks

- Short-headed legless skink (Acontias breviceps)
- Elongate short-legged burrowing skink (Brachymeles bicolor)
- Brachymeles minimus
- Northern litter skink (Caledoniscincus aquilonius)
- Armitage's cylindrical skink (Chalcides armitagei)
- Bedriaga's skink (Chalcides bedriagai)
- Lanza's skink (Chalcides lanzai)
- Atlas Mountain skink (Chalcides montanus)
- Moroccan Three-toed Skink (Chalcides pseudostriatus)
- Stanger's skink (Chioninia stangeri)
- Three-toed snake-tooth skink (Coeranoscincus reticulatus)
- Viti slender treeskink (Emoia concolor)
- Eremiascincus timorensis
- Sharma's mabuya (Eutropis nagarjuni)
- Solomon minute skink (Geomyersia glabra)
- Hakaria simonyi
- Ceylon tree skink (Lankascincus taprobanensis)
- Tiller's maquis skink (Lioscincus tillieri)
- Pandanus skink (Lipinia leptosoma)
- Stumpff's skink (Madascincus stumpffi)
- Fiordland skink (Oligosoma acrinasum)
- Marbled skink (Oligosoma oliveri)
- Paracontias brocchii
- Paracontias hafa
- Kishinoue's giant skink (Plestiodon kishinouyei)
- Rurk's ristella (Ristella rurkii)
- Gronovi's dwarf burrowing skink (Scelotes gronovii)
- Mountainous dwarf skink (Scincella monticola)
- Deplanche's shiny skink (Sigaloseps deplanchei)
- Beyer's sphenomorphus (Sphenomorphus beyeri)
- Leyte sphenomorphus (Sphenomorphus llanosi)
- Highland sphenomorphus (Sphenomorphus luzonense)
- Mindanao sphenomorphus (Sphenomorphus mindanensis)
- Aurora mountain skink (Sphenomorphus tagapayo)
- Sphenomorphus tritaeniatus
- Sphenomorphus victoria
- Alpine meadow mabuya (Trachylepis irregularis)
- Trachylepis nancycoutuae
- Trachylepis volamenaloha
- Voeltzkowia petiti

=== Sphaerodactylidae ===
Sphaerodactylid geckos

- Hispaniolan giant gecko (Aristelliger lar)
- Wadi Kharrar rock gecko (Pristurus gallagheri)
- Atlas day gecko (Quedenfeldtia trachyblepharus)
- Jamaican forest sphaero (Sphaerodactylus goniorhynchus)
- Zapata big-scaled sphaero (Sphaerodactylus richardi)

=== Tropiduridae ===
Neotropical ground lizards

- Tiburon curlytail (Leiocephalus melanochlorus)
- San Cristobal lava lizard (Microlophus bivittatus)
- Microlophus duncanensis
- Floreana lava lizard (Microlophus grayii)
- Stenocercus angel
- Lesser ornate whorltail iguana (Stenocercus ornatissimus)

=== Agamidae ===
Dragon lizards

- Draco mindanensis
- Solomons tree dragon (Hypsilurus macrolepis)
- Schmidt's mastigure (Uromastyx alfredschmidti)
- Uromastyx shobraki
- South Arabian spiny-tailed lizard (Uromastyx yemenensis)

=== Phyllodactylidae ===
Phyllodactylid geckos

- Darwin's leaf-toed gecko (Phyllodactylus darwini)
- Galapagos leaf-toed gecko (Phyllodactylus galapagensis)
- San Cristóbal Island leaf-toed gecko (Phyllodactylus leei)
- Phyllodactylus unctus
- Tarentola raziana

=== Phrynosomatidae ===
Phrynosomatid lizards

- Spot-tailed earless lizard (Holbrookia lacerata)
- Flat-tail horned lizard (Phrynosoma mcallii)
- Sceloporus ornatus
- Florida scrub lizard (Sceloporus woodi)
- Colorado desert fringe-toed lizard (Uma notata)
- Uma paraphygas
- Yuman desert fringe-toed lizard (Uma rufopunctata)

=== Liolaemidae ===
Liolaemid iguanas

- Liolaemus chavin
- Liolaemus quilmes
- Liolaemus silvai
- Liolaemus valdesianus
- Liolaemus walkeri
- Phymaturus payuniae

=== Other lizard species ===
- Ruthven's anadia (Anadia pulchella)
- Eared worm-lizard (Aprasia aurita)
- Arizona striped whiptail (Aspidoscelis arizonae)
- Gray checkered whiptail (Aspidoscelis dixoni)
- Colorado checkered whiptail (Aspidoscelis neotesselatus)
- Aspidoscelis rodecki
- Bachia blairi
- Echinosaura orcesi
- Gila monster (Heloderma suspectum)
- Mayan tropical night lizard (Lepidophyma mayae)
- Mountain pholidobolus (Pholidobolus montium)
- Soutpansberg flat lizard (Platysaurus relictus)
- Largescale lizard (Ptychoglossus eurylepis)
- Breyer’s whip lizard (Tetradactylus breyeri)
- Border thick-tailed gecko (Uvidicolus sphyrurus)
- Green Madagascar girdled lizard (Zonosaurus haraldmeieri)
- Red-legged girdled lizard (Zonosaurus rufipes)

== Snakes ==
There are 81 species and one subspecies of snake assessed as near threatened.

=== Pseudoxyrhophiids ===
- Compsophis albiventris
- Compsophis fatsibe
- Heteroliodon lava
- Liophidium pattoni
- Liopholidophis dimorphus
- Lycodryas carleti
- St. Johann's tree snake (Lycodryas sanctijohannis)
- Pseudoxyrhopus ambreensis
- Pseudoxyrhopus analabe
- Plateau brook snake (Pseudoxyrhopus imerinae)
- Thamnosophis mavotenda

=== Vipers ===
- Mexican ground pit viper (Agkistrodon bilineatus)
- Desert viper (Daboia deserti)
- Moorish viper (Daboia mauritanica)
- Armenian viper (Montivipera raddei)
- Kinabalu green pit viper (Parias malcolmi)
- Large-scaled pit viper (Peltopelor macrolepis)
- Horned pit viper (Protobothrops cornutus)
- Spider-tailed horned viper (Pseudocerastes urarachnoides)
- Brongersma's pit viper (Trimeresurus brongersmai)
- Lotiev's viper (Vipera lotievi)
- Atlas dwarf viper (Vipera monticola)
- Transcaucasian long-nosed viper (Vipera transcaucasiana)

=== Dipsadids ===
- Grey ground snake (Atractus occipitoalbus)
- Taylor's snail-eater (Dipsas tenuissima)
- Colombian earth snake (Geophis nigroalbus)
- Ninia celata
- Espinal's coffee snake (Ninia espinali)
- Vermiculate graceful brown snake (Rhadinaea vermiculaticeps)
- Stuart's graceful brown snake (Rhadinella pilonaorum)
- Rhadinella rogerromani
- Sibon manzanaresi
- Sibon miskitus
- Xizang hot-spring keel-back (Thermophis baileyi)
- Striped swamp snake (Tretanorhinus taeniatus)

=== Elapids ===
- Bardick (Echiopsis curta)
- Short-nosed snake (Elapognathus minor)
- Stephen's banded snake (Hoplocephalus stephensii)
- Large-headed seasnake (Hydrophis pacificus)
- Yellow-lipped sea snake (Laticauda frontalis)
- Laticauda guineai
- Black-banded sea krait (Laticauda semifasciata)
- Cauca coral snake (Micrurus multiscutatus)
- Micrurus spurrelli
- Caspian cobra (Naja oxiana)
- Philippine cobra (Naja philippinensis)
- Black-striped snake (Simoselaps calonotus)
- Japanese coral snake (Sinomicrurus japonicus)

=== Colubrids ===
- Günther's vine snake (Ahaetulla dispar)
- Conopsis amphisticha
- Four-lined snake (Elaphe quatuorlineata)
- Socotran racer (Hemerophis socotrae)
- Short-tailed snake (Lampropeltis extenuata)
- Ruthvens kingsnake (Lampropeltis ruthveni)
- Sakashima green snake (Liopeltis herminae)
- Western false smooth snake (Macroprotodon brevis)
- Oligodon lungshenensis
- Perkin's short-headed snake (Oligodon perkinsi)
- Pantherophis gloydi
- Sinai banded racer (Platyceps sinai)
- Taylor's burrowing snake (Pseudorabdion taylori)
- Triangled black-headed snake (Sibynophis triangularis)
- Filetail ground snake (Sonora aemula)

=== Keelbacks ===
- Blossom krait (Balanophis ceylonensis)
- Kirtland's snake (Clonophis kirtlandii)
- Taron keelback (Hebius taronensis)
- Brazos water snake (Nerodia harteri)
- Concho watersnake (Nerodia paucimaculata)
- Anderson's stream snake (Opisthotropis andersonii)
- Dao Van Tien's stream snake (Opisthotropis daovantieni)
- Guanxi mountain keelback (Opisthotropis guangxiensis)
- Negros spotted water snake (Trophidonophis negrosensis)

=== Other snakes ===
Species

- Lined centipede-eater (Aparallactus lineatus)
- Southwestern carpet python (Morelia imbricata)
- Iwasaki's snail-eater (Pareas iwasakii)
- African rock python (Python sebae)
- Ball python (Python regius)
- Indian rock python (Python molurus)
- Smith's earth snake (Uropeltis smithi)

== See also ==
- Lists of IUCN Red List near threatened species
- List of least concern reptiles
- List of vulnerable reptiles
- List of endangered reptiles
- List of critically endangered reptiles
- List of recently extinct reptiles
- List of data deficient reptiles
