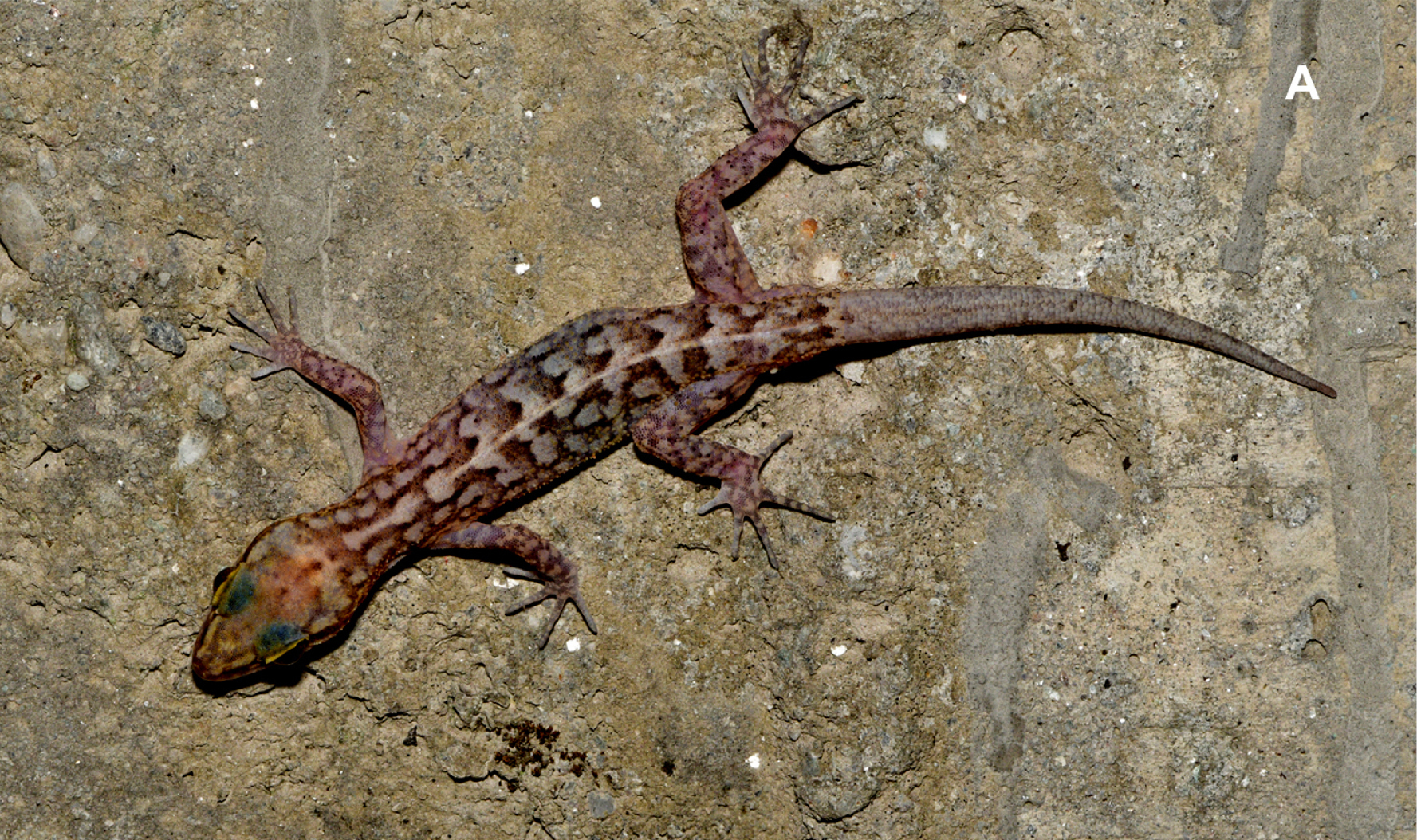

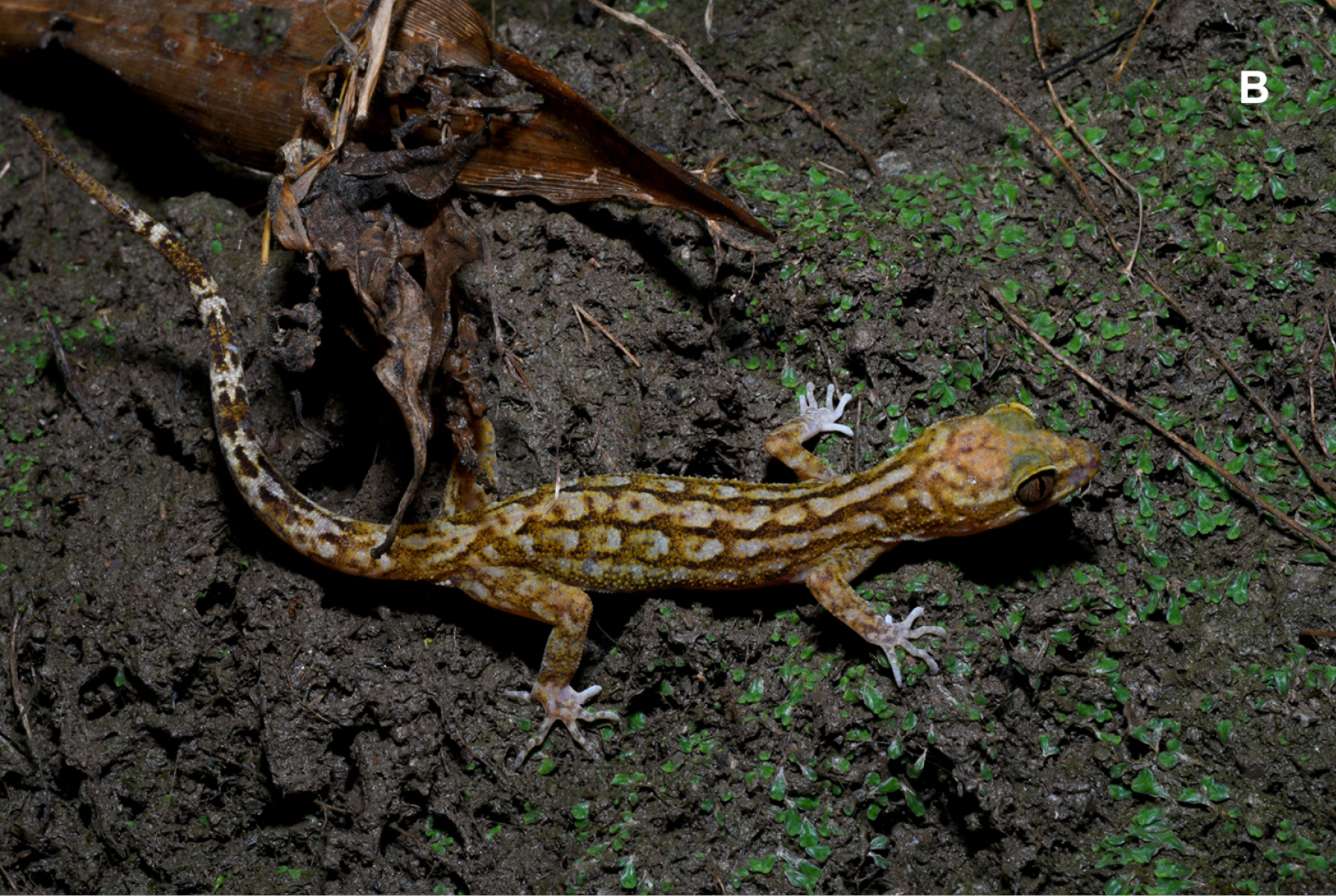

Scientific classification
- Kingdom: Animalia
- Phylum: Chordata
- Class: Reptilia
- Order: Squamata
- Suborder: Gekkota
- Family: Gekkonidae
- Genus: Cyrtodactylus
- Species: C. nebulicola

Binomial name
- Cyrtodactylus nebulicola Sumidh Ray, Bharath Bhupathi, Suvrajyoti Chatterjee, Ritesh Das, Pratyush P. Mohapatra, 2026

= Cyrtodactylus nebulicola =

Species of gecko

Cyrtodactylus nebulicola is a species of gecko that belongs to the subfamily Gekkoninae. It is native to the eastern Himalayan region of India. It is a medium-sized species that can reach to a maximum snout-to-vent length of 75.1 millimeters.

== Phylogeny ==
Phylogenetic analysis of this species has revealed that it belongs to the C. peguensis species group. The most clearly related species of C. nebulicola are Cyrtodactylus gubernatoris and Cyrtodactylus bhupathyi.

== Discovery ==
The holotype specimen (ZSI-R-29064) is an adult male. It was collected by Pratyush P. Mohapatra and Bharath Bhupathi on the 17th of April, 2024. The specimen was collected near Latpanchar village which is located in the Darjeeling district, West Bengal State, India. Several adult paratype specimens, both male and female, were also discovered near this area.

The discovery of Cyrtodactylus nebulicola makes it currently the sixth endemic species of reptile that has been described from West Bengal. This makes the discovery of this species important because the region it is endemic from is poorly studied.
