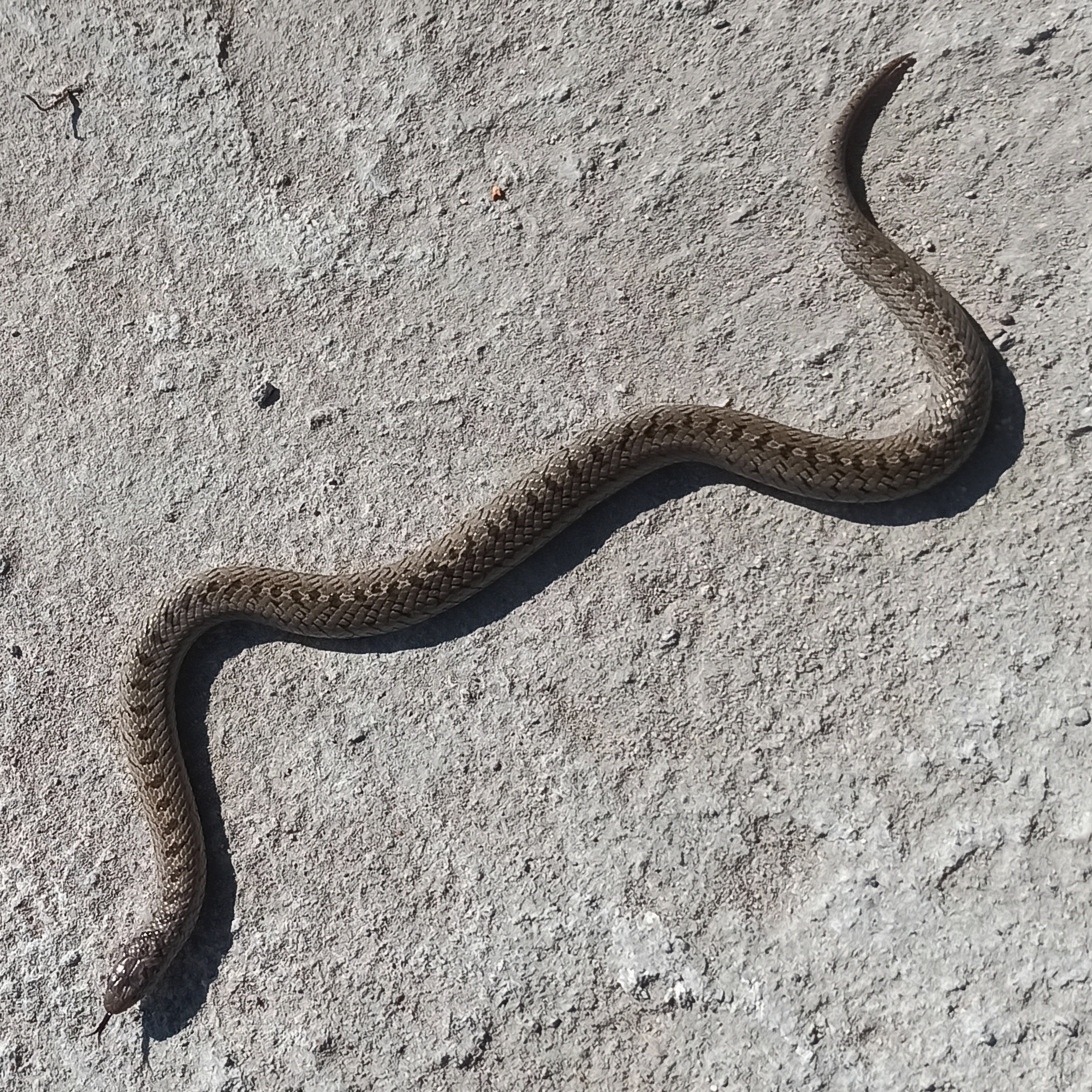

Conservation status
- Least Concern (IUCN 3.1)

Scientific classification
- Kingdom: Animalia
- Phylum: Chordata
- Class: Reptilia
- Order: Squamata
- Suborder: Serpentes
- Family: Colubridae
- Genus: Conopsis
- Species: C. nasus

Binomial name
- Conopsis nasus (Günther, 1858)
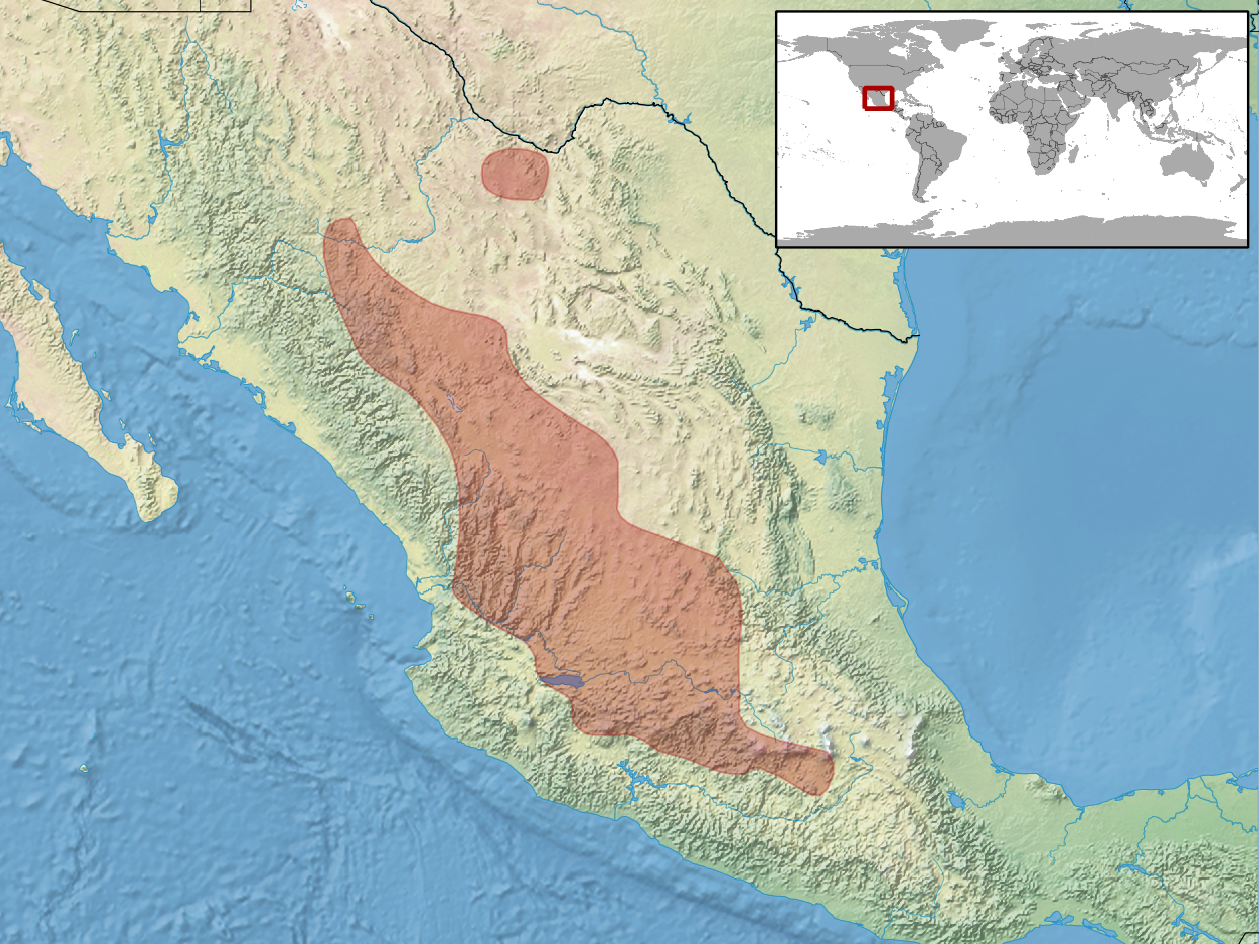

= Conopsis nasus =

Species of snake

Conopsis nasus, the largenose earth snake, is a species of nonvenomous snake in the family Colubridae. The species is found in Mexico.
