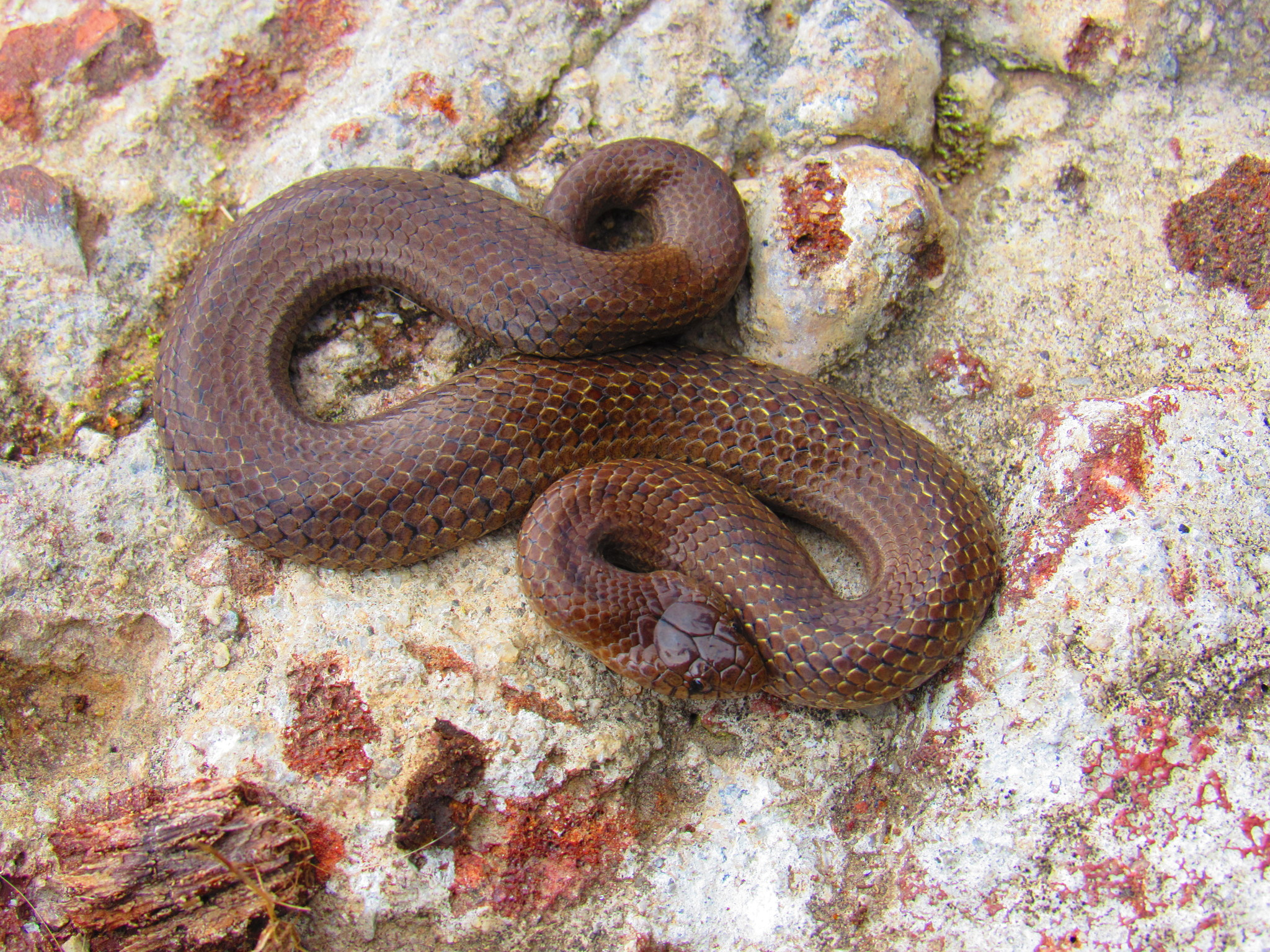

Conservation status
- Least Concern (IUCN 3.1)

Scientific classification
- Kingdom: Animalia
- Phylum: Chordata
- Class: Reptilia
- Order: Squamata
- Suborder: Serpentes
- Family: Colubridae
- Genus: Conopsis
- Species: C. biserialis

Binomial name
- Conopsis biserialis Taylor & Smith, 1942
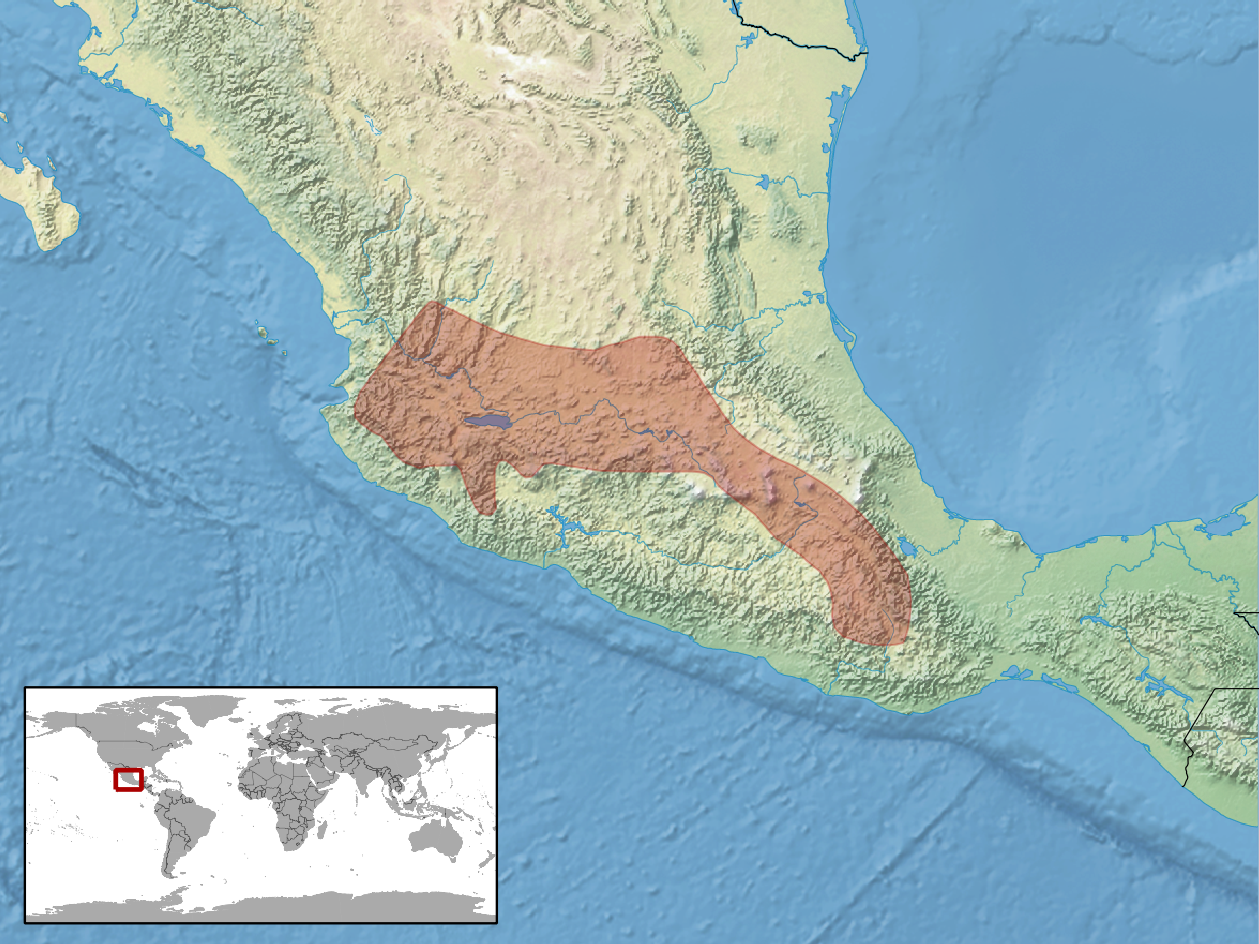

= Conopsis biserialis =

Species of snake

Conopsis biserialis, the two-lined Mexican earth snake, is a species of nonvenomous snake in the family Colubridae. The species is found in Mexico.
