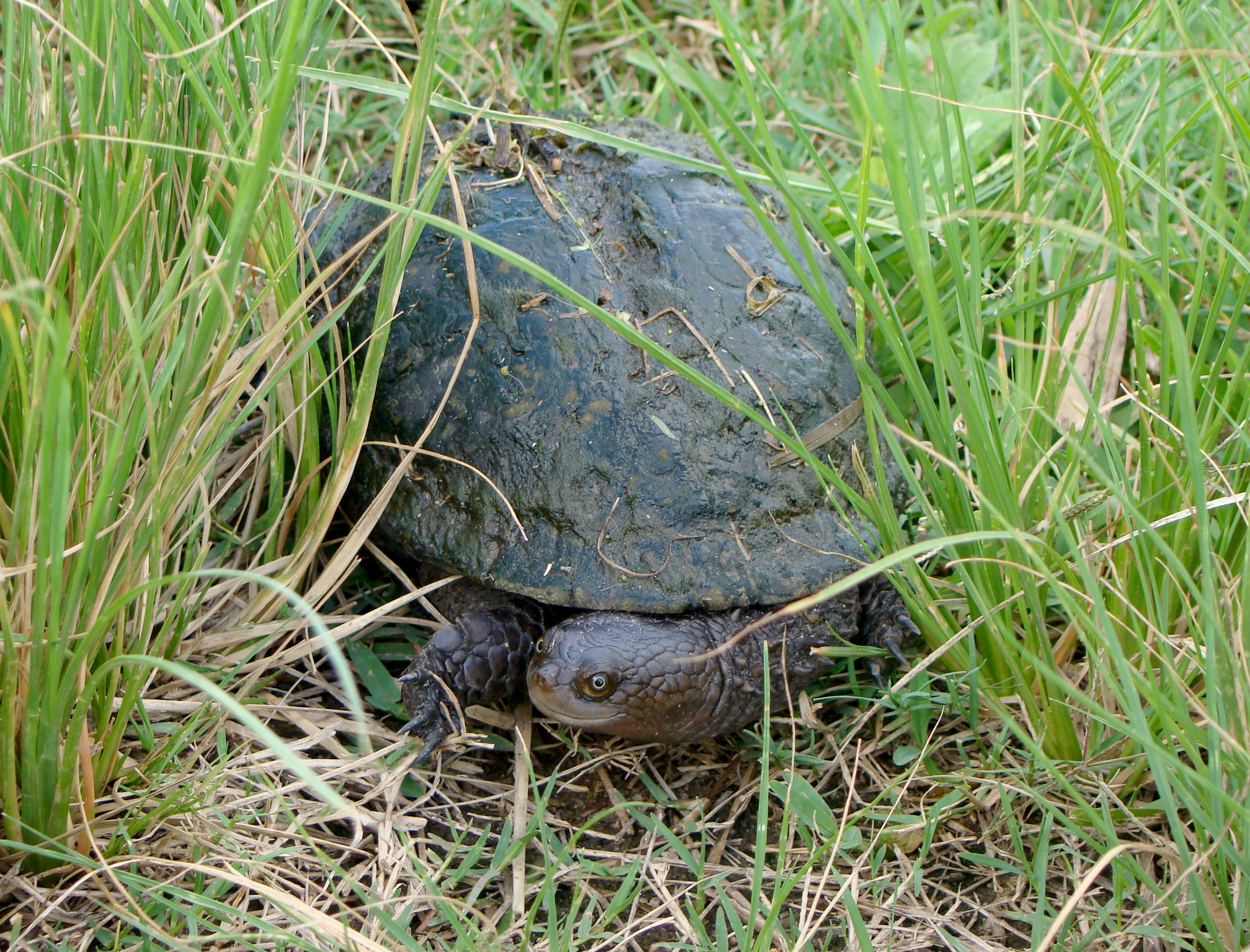
- Black spine-necked turtle (A. spixii)

Scientific classification
- Kingdom: Animalia
- Phylum: Chordata
- Order: Testudines
- Suborder: Pleurodira
- Family: Chelidae
- Subfamily: Chelinae
- Genus: Acanthochelys; Gray 1873

Species
- Acanthochelys macrocephala Acanthochelys pallidipectoris Acanthochelys radiolata Acanthochelys spixii

= Acanthochelys =

Genus of turtles

Acanthochelys is a genus of turtles, the spiny swamp turtles, in the family Chelidae, subfamily Chelinae, found in South America. Until recently, the species of this genus were considered to be members of the genus Platemys, but were moved to the resurrected genus originally described by Gray (1873) based on the type species by monotypy Acanthochelys spixii.

== Taxonomy ==
Current nomenclature for this genus follows that of van Dijk et al. (2012):

- Big-headed pantanal swamp turtle (A. macrocephala Rhodin, Mittermeier, and McMorris 1984)
- Chaco side-necked turtle (A. pallidipectoris Freiberg 1945)
- Brazilian radiolated swamp turtle (A. radiolata Mikan 1820)
- Black spine-neck swamp turtle (A. spixii Duméril and Bibron 1835)
