= Conopsis =

Scientific classification
- Kingdom: Animalia
- Phylum: Chordata
- Class: Reptilia
- Order: Squamata
- Suborder: Serpentes
- Family: Colubridae
- Subfamily: Colubrinae
- Genus: Conopsis; Günther, 1858

Genus of snakes

Conopsis is a genus of snakes in the family Colubridae. The genus is endemic to Mexico.

== Species ==
Six species are recognized as being valid.

- Conopsis acuta (Cope, 1886) - spotted Tolucan earth snake
- Conopsis amphisticha (H.M. Smith & Laufe, 1945) - twin-spotted Tolucan earth snake
- Conopsis biserialis (Taylor & H.M. Smith, 1942) - two-lined Mexican earth snake
- Conopsis lineata (Kennicott, 1859) - lined Tolucan ground snake, lined Tolucan earth snake
- Conopsis megalodon (Taylor & H.M. Smith, 1942) - San Felipe ground snake
- Conopsis nasus Günther, 1858 - largenose earth snake

Nota bene: A binomial authority in parentheses indicates that the species was originally described in a genus other than Conopsis.
