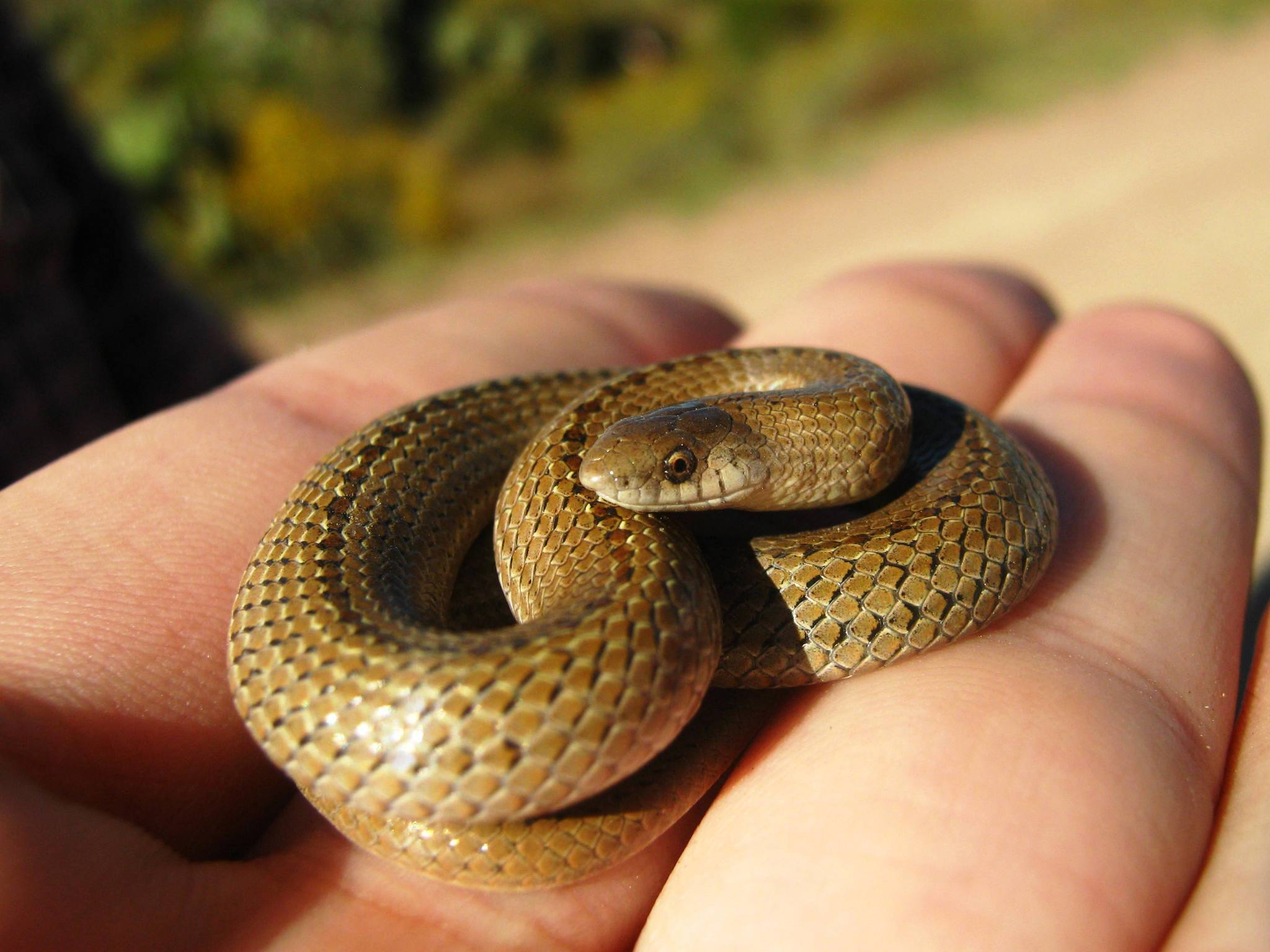

Conservation status
- Least Concern (IUCN 3.1)

Scientific classification
- Kingdom: Animalia
- Phylum: Chordata
- Class: Reptilia
- Order: Squamata
- Suborder: Serpentes
- Family: Colubridae
- Genus: Conopsis
- Species: C. lineata

Binomial name
- Conopsis lineata (Kennicott, 1859)
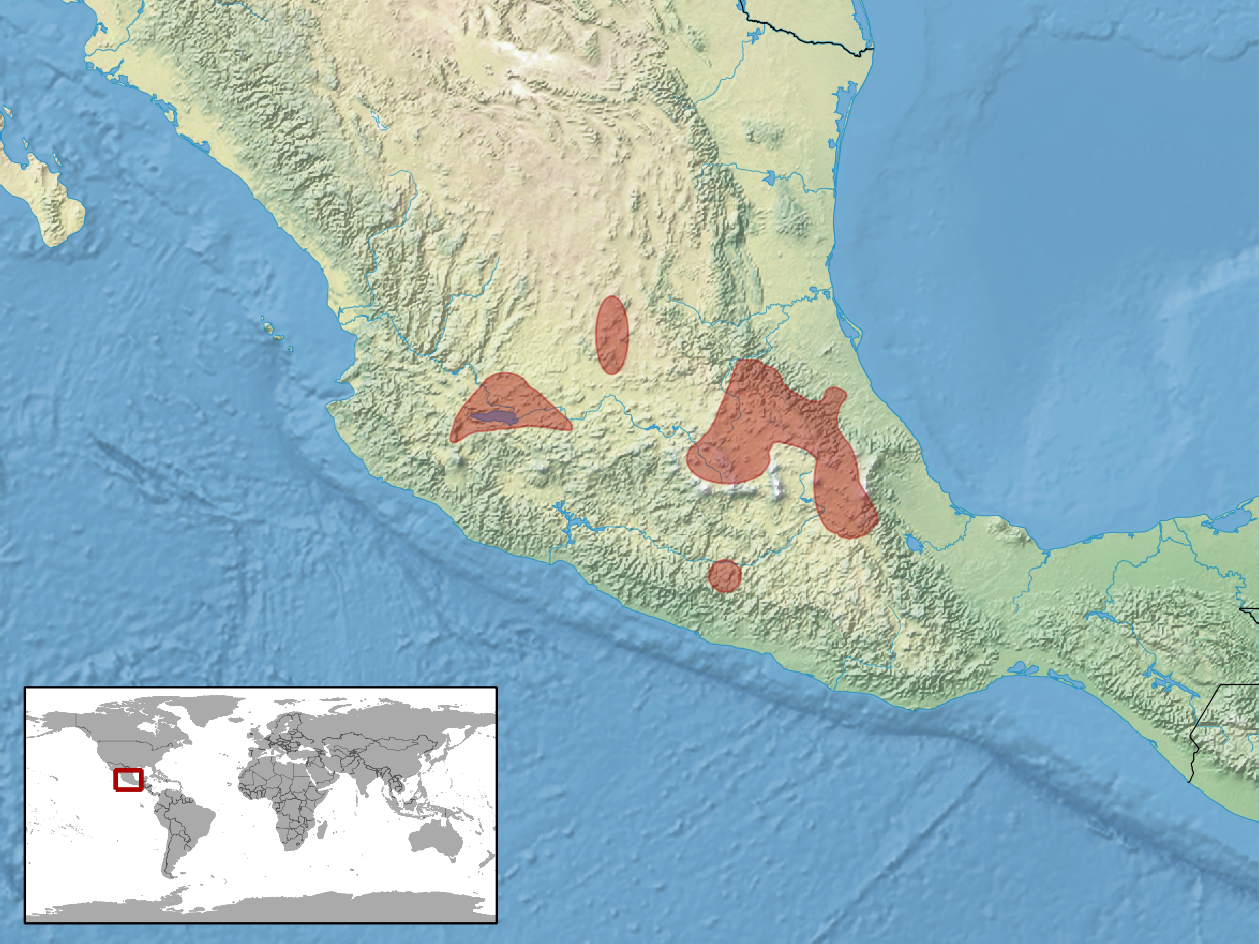

= Conopsis lineata =

Species of snake

Conopsis lineata, the lined Tolucan ground snake or lined Tolucan earth snake, is a species of nonvenomous snake in the family Colubridae. The species is found in Mexico. It eats insects.
