= Pai striped whiptail =

Arizona striped whiptail

Conservation status
- Least Concern (IUCN 3.1)

Scientific classification
- Kingdom: Animalia
- Phylum: Chordata
- Class: Reptilia
- Order: Squamata
- Family: Teiidae
- Genus: Aspidoscelis
- Species: A. pai

Binomial name
- Aspidoscelis pai (Wright and Lowe, 1993)

Species of lizard

The Pai striped whiptail (Aspidoscelis pai) is a lizard species of the genus Aspidoscelis, very similar to the Arizona striped whiptail, and endemic to Arizona in the United States.
