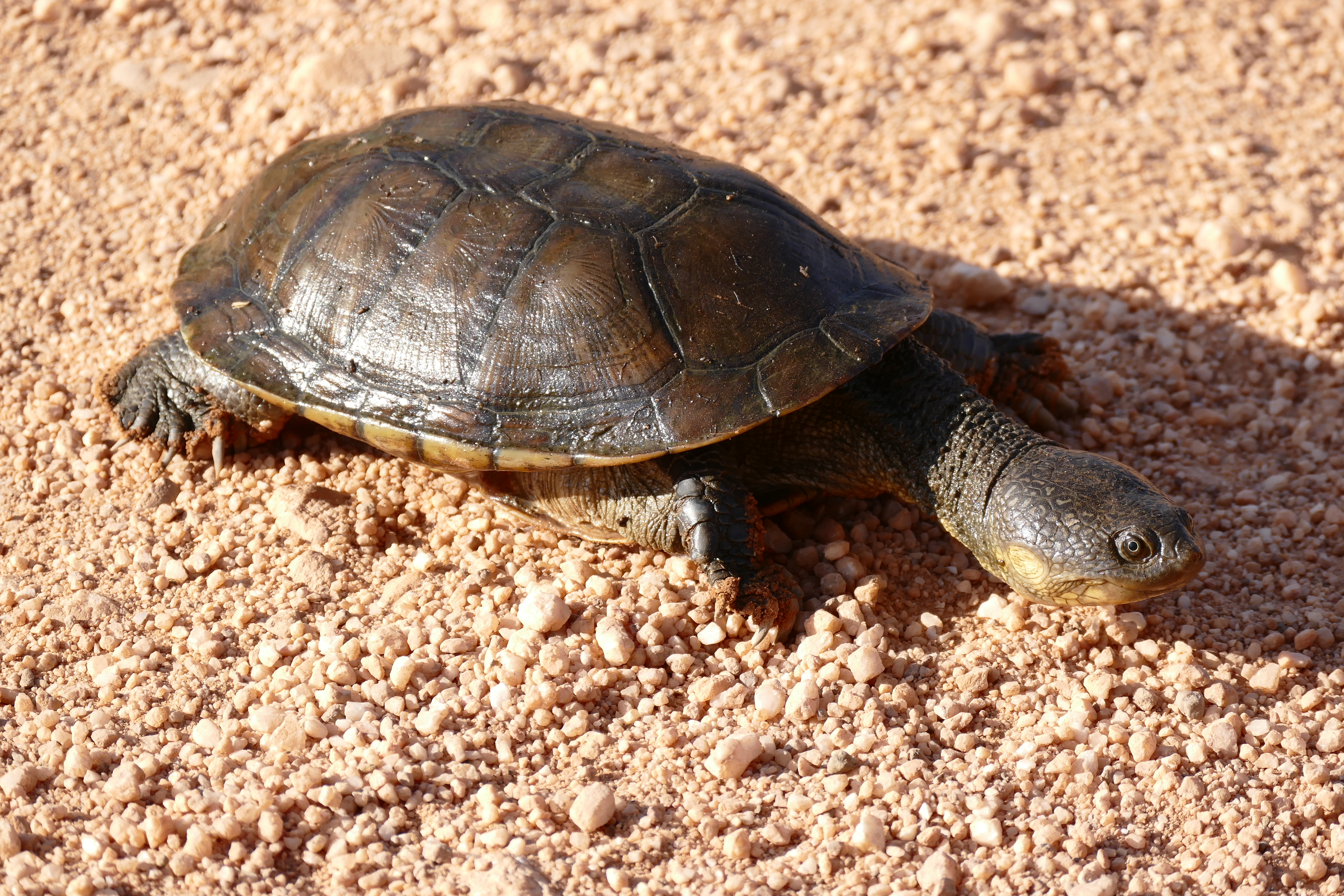

Conservation status
- Near Threatened (IUCN 3.1)

Scientific classification
- Kingdom: Animalia
- Phylum: Chordata
- Class: Reptilia
- Order: Testudines
- Suborder: Pleurodira
- Family: Chelidae
- Genus: Acanthochelys
- Species: A. macrocephala

Binomial name
- Acanthochelys macrocephala (Rhodin, Mittermeier & McMorris, 1984)

Synonyms
- Phrynops schoepffii Fitzinger in Siebenrock 1904:27 (nomen nudum); Platemys macrocephala Rhodin, Mittermeier, and McMorris 1984:38; Phrynops chacoensis Fritz and Pauler 1992:299

= Big-headed pantanal swamp turtle =

Species of turtle

The big-headed pantanal swamp turtle or pantanal swamp turtle (Acanthochelys macrocephala) is a species of turtle in the family Chelidae found in Brazil, Bolivia, Argentina, and Paraguay.

== Recognition ==
This is the largest of the South American Acanthochelys species, growing to 23.5 cm (9.3 in) in carapace length. It has a broad, oval to moderately elongated, deep carapace with a shallow dorsal groove extending along the second to fourth vertebrals. The first and fifth vertebral scutes are very broad, the second through fourth may be slightly longer than broad, and the fifth is laterally expanded. Vertebral and pleural scutes may be rugose with growth annuli. Marginals 1, 2, and 8-10 are slightly expanded but not flared, and 3-7 are often slightly upturned. The carapace is highest just behind the center and broadest at the level of the anterior part of the eighth marginals; its posterior rim may be weakly serrated. The carapace is dark to blackish brown, but may be light brown in some. Juveniles often have lighter brown radiations on their carapacial scutes. The broad plastron and bridge are yellow with some dark pigment extending along the seams (sometimes covering most of a scute, but usually not the areola); this pigment fades with age. The fore lobe is broader than the hind lobe, which contains a deep posterior notch. The intergular scute is about half as long as the length of the fore lobe. The plastral formula is: intergul > fem > abd > hum > an > gul > pect. The head is extremely broad; the carapace length averages only 4.4 times the tympanic head width, and older females may have massive heads. It is dark grayish brown above, yellow or cream below; the area of demarcation is indistinct. The tympanum and posterior part of the lower jaw are yellow with a few gray blotches and orange spots. Jaws are grayish yellow; the iris is brown tan. Dorsally, the head is covered with large distinct scales. There are two chin barbels. The neck is grayish brown dorsally, yellow ventrally, and has a few scattered blunt, conical tubercles on the dorsal surface. Limbs are gray on the outside, yellow beneath, and covered with large scales. Large conical tubercles are present on the inside of each thigh. The karyotype is 2n = 48.

Females are larger and more domed; males have slightly concave plastra and longer, thicker tails.

== Distribution ==
A. macrocephala is known from the upper Rio Mamoré drainage of central Bolivia, the Pantanal region and other swamplands of the upper Rio Paraguay drainage in southwestern Mato Grosso, Brazil, to the Chaco of Paraguay. Its range in Bolivia may be more extended.

This species is most closely related to Acanthochelys radiolata; it includes Phrynops chacoensis. It inhabits marshes, swamps, and slow-flowing streams.They also live in Venezuela also the yellow footed turtles.. In Venezuela Chaco it's called Galapago they have big neck and big tail.

== Natural history ==
Nesting starts near the end of the wet season, in April–May, and hatchlings probably emerge between December and March. Clutch size ranges from 4-8 white, rounded (28-32.5 x 25.8–31 mm; 11-20 g), hard-shelled eggs (Cintra and Yamashita, 1989). Incubation takes over six months; hatchlings (about 3.8 mm) have orange-red spots on the carapace, plastron, and sides of the neck. Snails form a large part of this turtle's diet.

== Status ==
The status of this species is listed as lower risk: near threatened by the IUCN. The Chaco population, listed separately as Acanthochelys chacoensis, is considered vulnerable.
