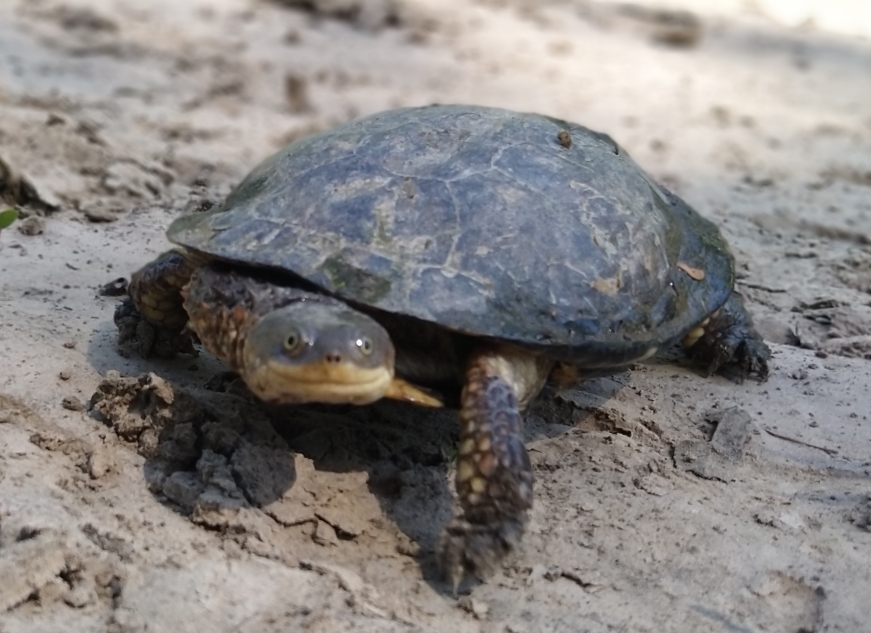

Conservation status
- Endangered (IUCN 3.1)

Scientific classification
- Kingdom: Animalia
- Phylum: Chordata
- Class: Reptilia
- Order: Testudines
- Suborder: Pleurodira
- Family: Chelidae
- Genus: Acanthochelys
- Species: A. pallidipectoris

Binomial name
- Acanthochelys pallidipectoris (Freiberg, 1945)

Synonyms
- Platemys pallidipectoris Freiberg, 1945; Acanthochelys pallidipectoris Iverson, 1986

= Chaco side-necked turtle =

Species of turtle

The Chaco side-necked turtle (Acanthochelys pallidipectoris) is a species of turtle in the family Chelidae. It is endemic to the Gran Chaco region of South America, being found in Argentina, Paraguay and Bolivia.

== Taxonomy ==
The first description of the species was published in 1945 by Marcos A. Freiberg, who placed it in the genus Platemys. A man by the name Augusto V. Aula collected the holotype, a female, in July 1944, with the type locality being Presidencia Roque Sáenz Peña, Chaco, Argentina. John B. Iverson moved the species to the genus Acanthochelys in 1986.

== Description ==
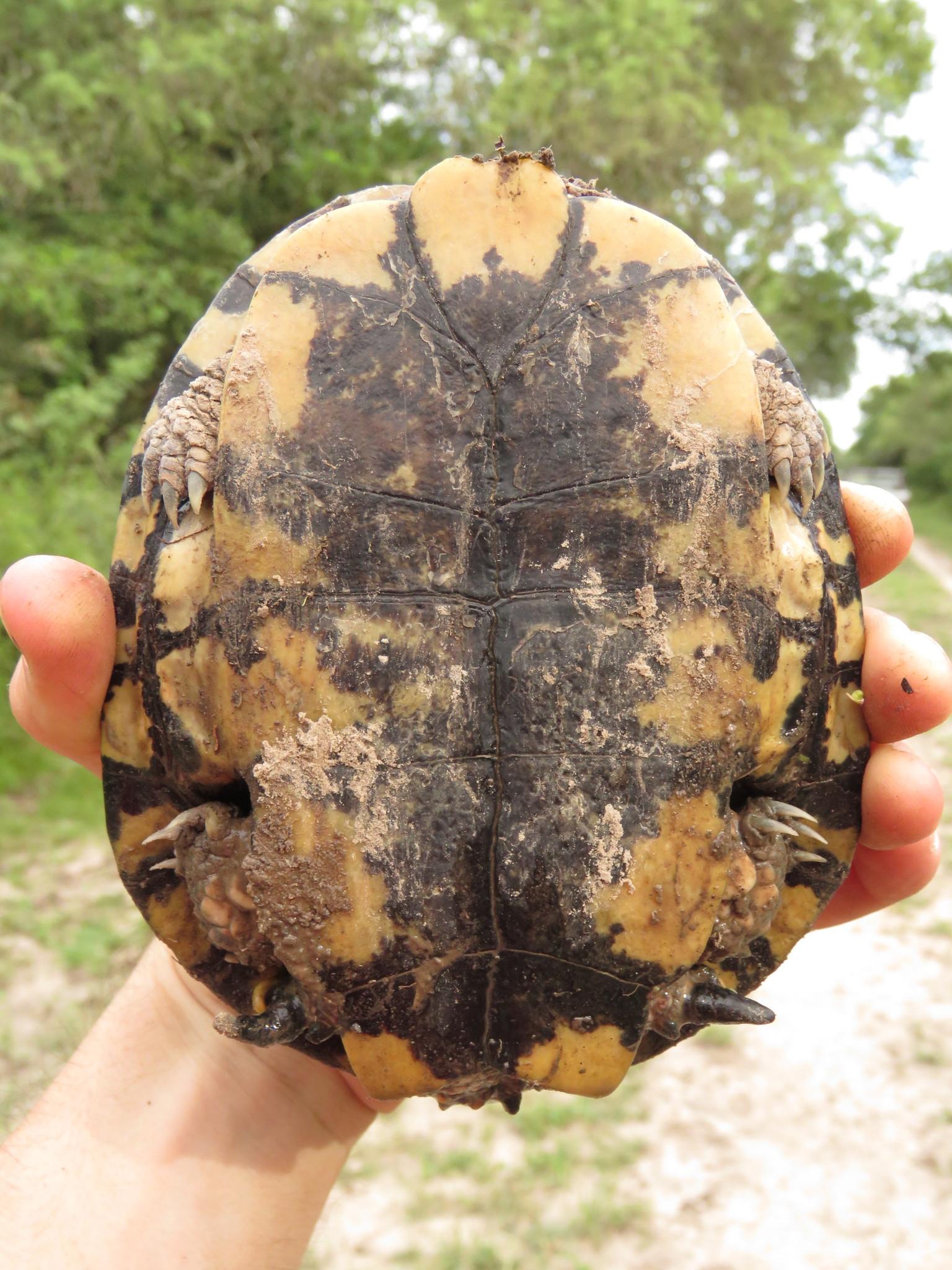
Very large dark seams on the plastron of an individual.

A. pallidipectoris individuals are typically born with carapace lengths of about 31 mm (1.2 in), growing to 12.8–16.2 cm (5.0–6.4 in) and weighing about 400 g (14 oz) in adulthood, with the maximum recorded length being 17.5 cm (6.9 in). Females tend to be slightly larger and have their carapaces reach slightly higher than the males, while males have the thicker tails. The carapace in adults is elliptical, reaching its highest point right behind the centre and its broadest point near the 8th marginal scute, and has a shallow groove running down the middle, which gives the carapace the appearance of being flattened. The rim of the carapace lacks serration. The carapace can be yellowish brown, greyish brown or olive in colour, and usually has dark seams. The plastron and bridge are yellow with broad dark seams; in some individuals these seams are so broad that the centre of the plastron barely has any yellow colouration visible. The plastron is wider towards the front, and in males it is concave.

The neck is grey to brown on top, with conical tubercles that go on down the sides of the neck but not onto the greyish yellow underside. The tympanum is yellow and the iris is white. The top of the head is covered in scales.

The legs are yellow, are covered in large scales, have webbed toes and large tubercles on the upper parts of the thighs.

== Distribution ==
Acanthochelys pallidipectoris is endemic to the Gran Chaco, being found in Argentina, Paraguay and the southeasternmost part of Bolivia.
