= Conopsis acuta =

Scientific classification
- Kingdom: Animalia
- Phylum: Chordata
- Class: Reptilia
- Order: Squamata
- Suborder: Serpentes
- Family: Colubridae
- Genus: Conopsis
- Species: C. acuta

Binomial name
- Conopsis acuta (Cope, 1886)

Species of snake

Conopsis acuta, the spotted Tolucan earth snake, is a species of nonvenomous snake in the family Colubridae. The species is found in Mexico.
