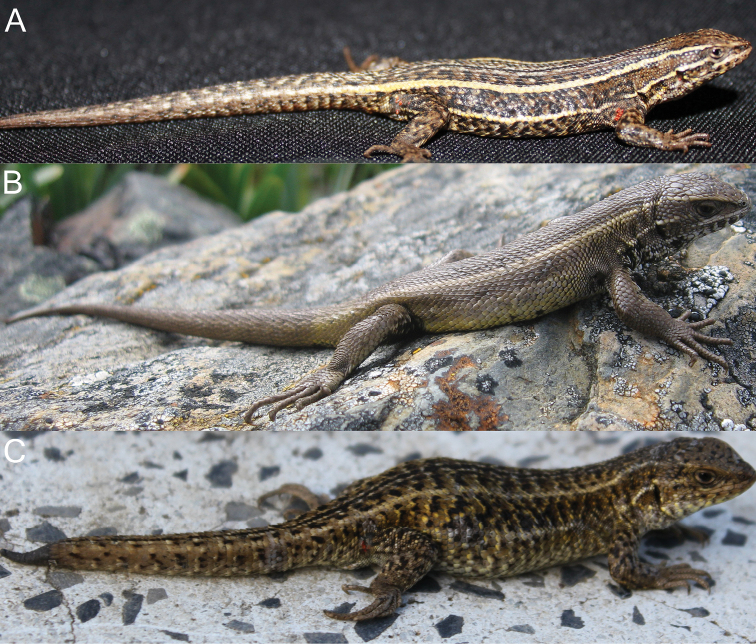

Conservation status
- Near Threatened (IUCN 3.1)

Scientific classification
- Kingdom: Animalia
- Phylum: Chordata
- Class: Reptilia
- Order: Squamata
- Suborder: Iguania
- Family: Liolaemidae
- Genus: Liolaemus
- Species: L. walkeri

Binomial name
- Liolaemus walkeri Shreve, 1938

Synonyms
- Liolaemus walkeri Shreve, 1938; Liolaemus alticolor walkeri — Hellmich, 1961; Liolaemus walkeri — Etheridge, 1995

= Liolaemus walkeri =

Species of lizard

Liolaemus walkeri is a species of lizard in the family Liolaemidae. The species is endemic to South America.

== Etymology ==
The specific name, walkeri, is in honor of American herpetologist Warren Franklin Walker, Jr. (1918–2013).

== Geographic range ==
L. walkeri is found in Peru.

== Habitat ==
The preferred natural habitat of L. walkeri is grassland, at altitudes of 3,963–4,211 m (13,002–13,816 ft).

== Reproduction ==
L. walkeri is viviparous.
