= Cyrtodactylus salomonensis =

Conservation status
- Near Threatened (IUCN 3.1)

Scientific classification
- Kingdom: Animalia
- Phylum: Chordata
- Class: Reptilia
- Order: Squamata
- Suborder: Gekkota
- Family: Gekkonidae
- Genus: Cyrtodactylus
- Species: C. salomonensis

Binomial name
- Cyrtodactylus salomonensis Rösler, Richards, & Günther, 2007

Synonyms
- Cyrtodactylus solomonensis

Species of lizard

Cyrtodactylus salomonensis is a species of gecko that is endemic to the Solomon Islands.
