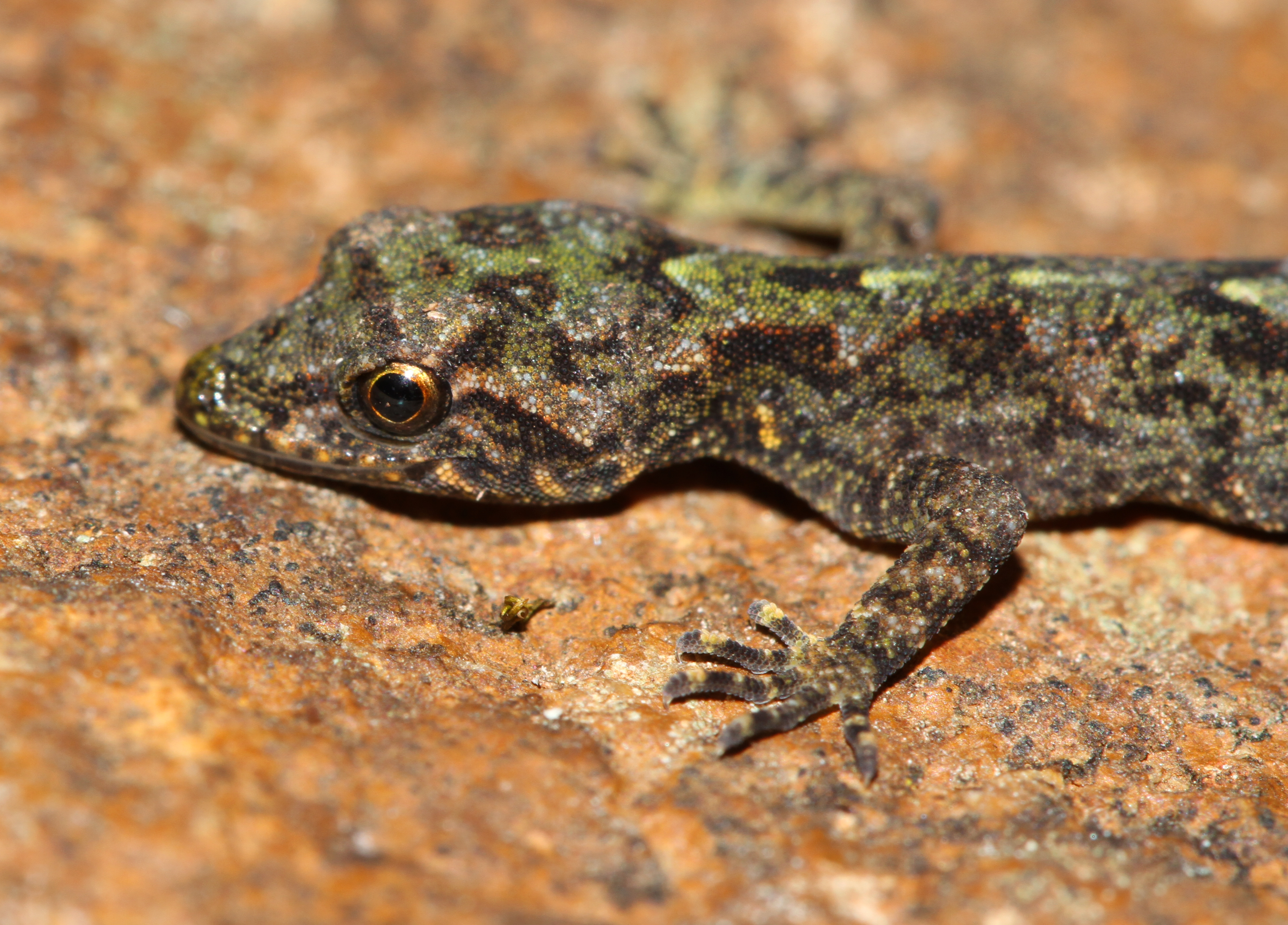

Conservation status
- Near Threatened (IUCN 3.1)

Scientific classification
- Kingdom: Animalia
- Phylum: Chordata
- Class: Reptilia
- Order: Squamata
- Suborder: Gekkota
- Family: Gekkonidae
- Genus: Cnemaspis
- Species: C. nilagirica

Binomial name
- Cnemaspis nilagirica Manamendra-Arachchi, Batuwita & Pethiyagoda, 2007

= Nilgiri day gecko =

Species of reptile

The Nilgiri day gecko (Cnemaspis nilagirica) is a species of gecko endemic to southern India. It was formerly known only from a single female specimen collected in 1885 that was misidentified as a variety of the Kandyan day gecko (C. kandiana var. tropidogaster ) by George Albert Boulenger, who used it as a syntype for his description of the variety. After a living population was not reported for over 130 years, a live male was collected in 2019, marking the first collection of a male specimen of C. nilagirica.
