= Malagasy dwarf gecko =

Conservation status
- Near Threatened (IUCN 3.1)

Scientific classification
- Kingdom: Animalia
- Phylum: Chordata
- Class: Reptilia
- Order: Squamata
- Suborder: Gekkota
- Family: Gekkonidae
- Genus: Lygodactylus
- Species: L. klemmeri

Binomial name
- Lygodactylus klemmeri G. Pasteur, 1965
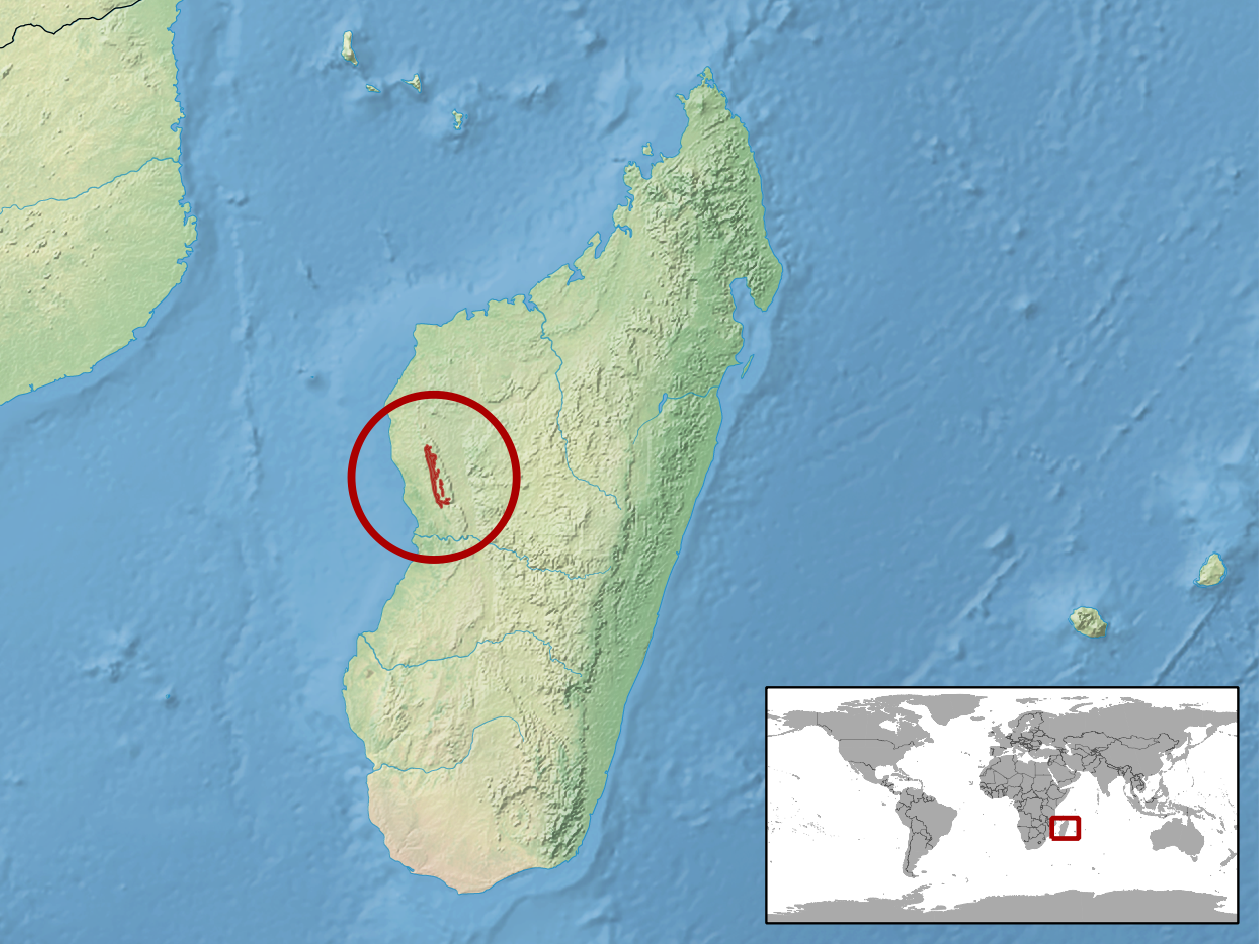

Synonyms
- Lygodactylus praecox G. Pasteur, 1995

Species of lizard

The Malagasy dwarf gecko (Lygodactylus klemmeri), also known commonly as Klemmer's dwarf gecko, is a species of gecko, a lizard in the family Gekkonidae. The species is endemic to Madagascar.

== Geographic range ==
L. klemmeri is found in western Madagascar in the Bemaraha region, including Tsingy de Bemaraha Strict Nature Reserve.

== Etymology ==
The specific name, klemmeri, is in honor of German herpetologist Konrad Klemmer.

== Description ==
The throat of L. klemmeri is yellowish, with diagonal black stripes. The tail is distinctly whorled. Males have nine preanal pores.

== Habitat ==
The preferred natural habitat of L. klemmeri is forest.

== Behavior ==
L. klemmeri is diurnal, and arboreal.

== Reproduction ==
L. klemmeri is oviparous.
