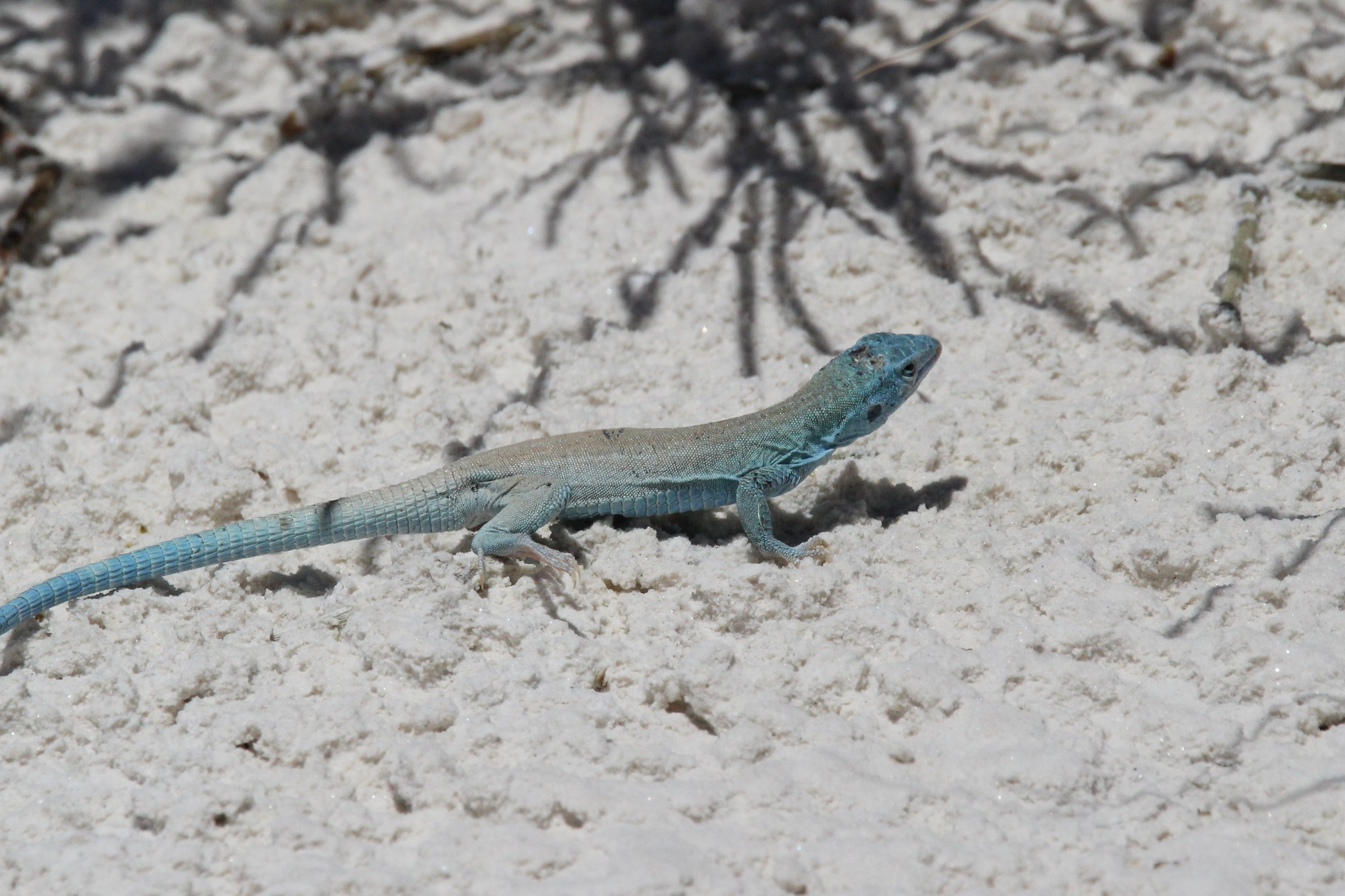

Conservation status
- Near Threatened (IUCN 3.1)

Scientific classification
- Kingdom: Animalia
- Phylum: Chordata
- Class: Reptilia
- Order: Squamata
- Family: Teiidae
- Genus: Aspidoscelis
- Species: A. arizonae

Binomial name
- Aspidoscelis arizonae (Van Denburgh, 1896)

= Arizona striped whiptail =

Species of lizard

The Arizona striped whiptail (Aspidoscelis arizonae) is a species of whiptail lizard endemic to the United States. This is a species of lizards that lives in Arizona's grassy desert areas and is normally found hiding in desert shrubs. They are approximately 72 millimetres (2.8 in) long, and, like all whiptails, they have a noticeably long whiplike tail hence the name whiptail and they are fast runners .

A. arizonae are identifiable by their brown and blue bodies with noticeable yellow stripes. They are easily confused with the Pai striped whiptail.

== Same-sex behavior ==
This species, like many whiptail lizards, is an obligate parthenogenetic species. Since no males exist, reproduction occurs through pseudocopulation between two female individuals, which triggers ovulation and enables the parthenogenetic process.

== Facultative parthenogenesis ==
A. arizonae haploid unfertilized oocytes can undergo facultative parthenogenesis by a post-meiotic mechanism resulting in genome wide homozygosity. In many species that are capable of facultative parthenogenesis, the transition to the completely homozygous condition leads to exposure of the genetic load and results in embryonic mortality and an elevated rate of congenital malformations. Despite this risk, in A. arizonae a small percentage of unfertilized oocytes are able to undergo parthenogenesis and develop normally. Thus, in the case of A. arizonae, facultative parthenogenesis can potentially allow purifying selection to happen with the consequence that all lethal recessive alleles are purged in just one generation.
