= Conopsis amphisticha =

Conservation status
- Near Threatened (IUCN 3.1)

Scientific classification
- Kingdom: Animalia
- Phylum: Chordata
- Class: Reptilia
- Order: Squamata
- Suborder: Serpentes
- Family: Colubridae
- Genus: Conopsis
- Species: C. amphisticha

Binomial name
- Conopsis amphisticha (Smith & Laufe, 1945))
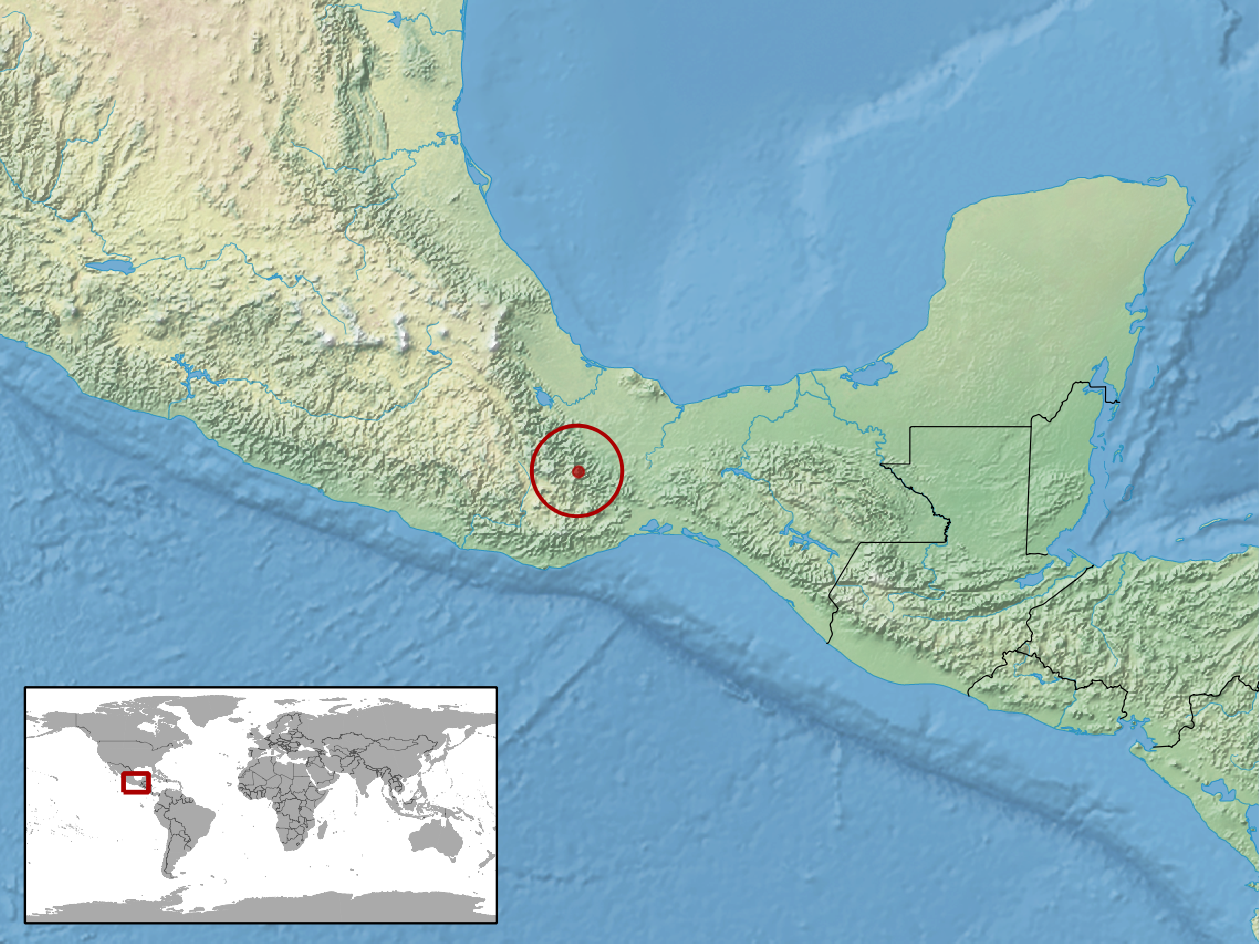

Species of snake

Conopsis amphisticha, the twin-spotted Tolucan earth snake, is a species of nonvenomous snake in the family Colubridae. The species is found in Mexico.
