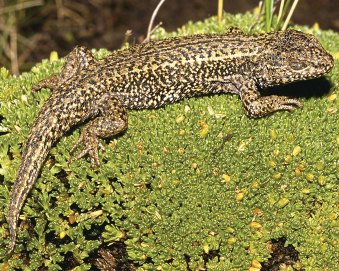

Conservation status
- Near Threatened (IUCN 3.1)

Scientific classification
- Kingdom: Animalia
- Phylum: Chordata
- Class: Reptilia
- Order: Squamata
- Suborder: Iguania
- Family: Liolaemidae
- Genus: Liolaemus
- Species: L. chavin

Binomial name
- Liolaemus chavin Aguilar et al., 2013

= Liolaemus chavin =

Species of lizard

Liolaemus chavin is a species of lizard in the family Liolaemidae. It is native to Peru.
