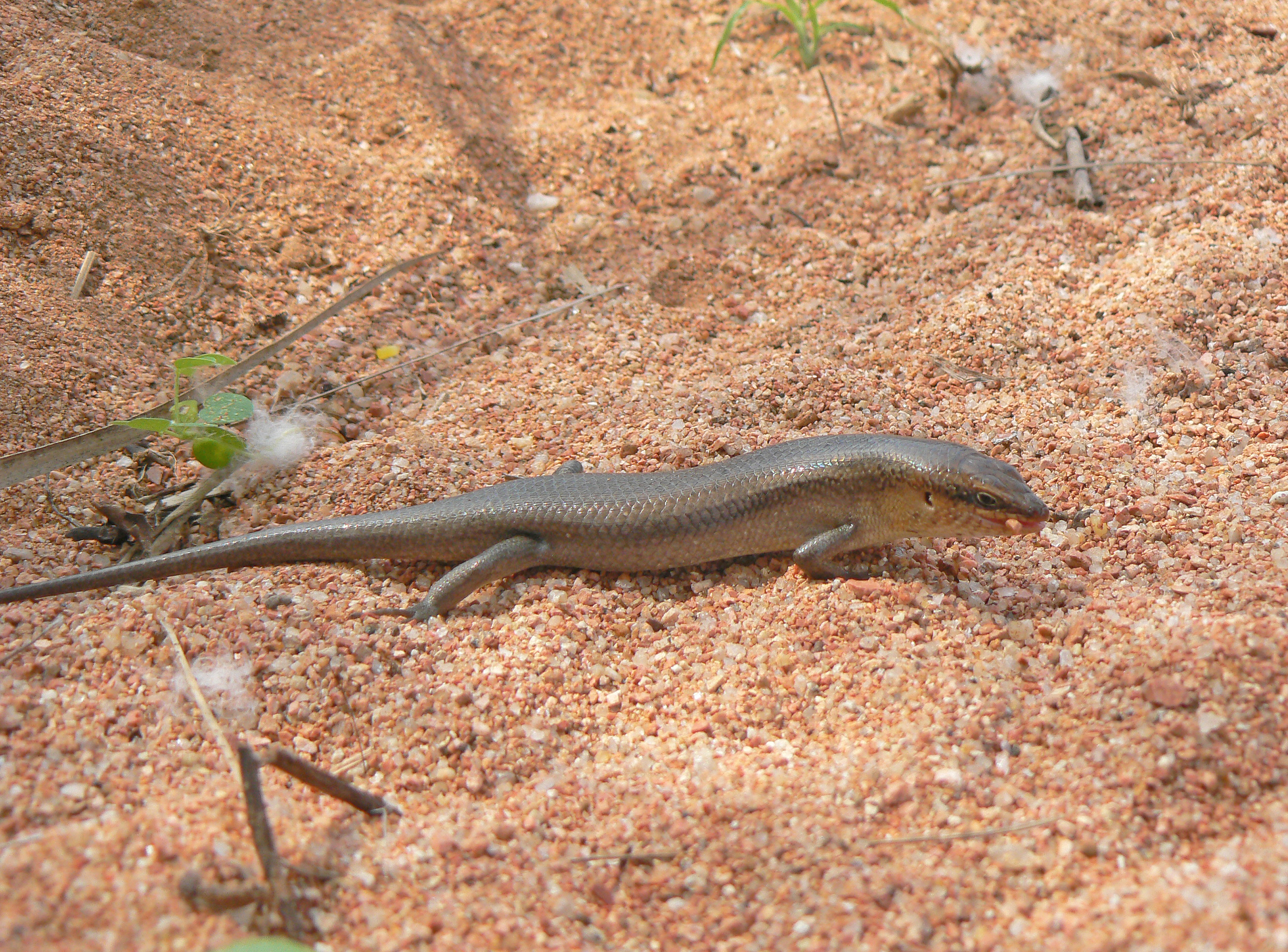

Conservation status
- Near Threatened (IUCN 3.1)

Scientific classification
- Kingdom: Animalia
- Phylum: Chordata
- Class: Reptilia
- Order: Squamata
- Family: Scincidae
- Genus: Hakaria; Steindachner, 1899
- Species: H. simonyi

Binomial name
- Hakaria simonyi (Steindachner, 1899)

Synonyms
- Sepsina (Hakaria) simonyi Steindachner, 1899; Parachalcides socotranus Boulenger, 1899; Scelotes simonyi — Barbour & Loveridge, 1928; Hakaria simonyi — Rösler & Wranik, 2004

= Hakaria =

Genus of lizards

Hakaria is a genus of skink, a lizard in the family Scincidae. The genus contains one species, Hakaria simonyi, which is endemic to Socotra.

== Etymology ==
The specific name, simonyi, is in honor of Viennese naturalist Oskar Simony (1852–1915).

== Habitat ==
The preferred natural habitat of H. simonyi is shrubland, at altitudes of 10–1,463 m (33–4,800 ft).
