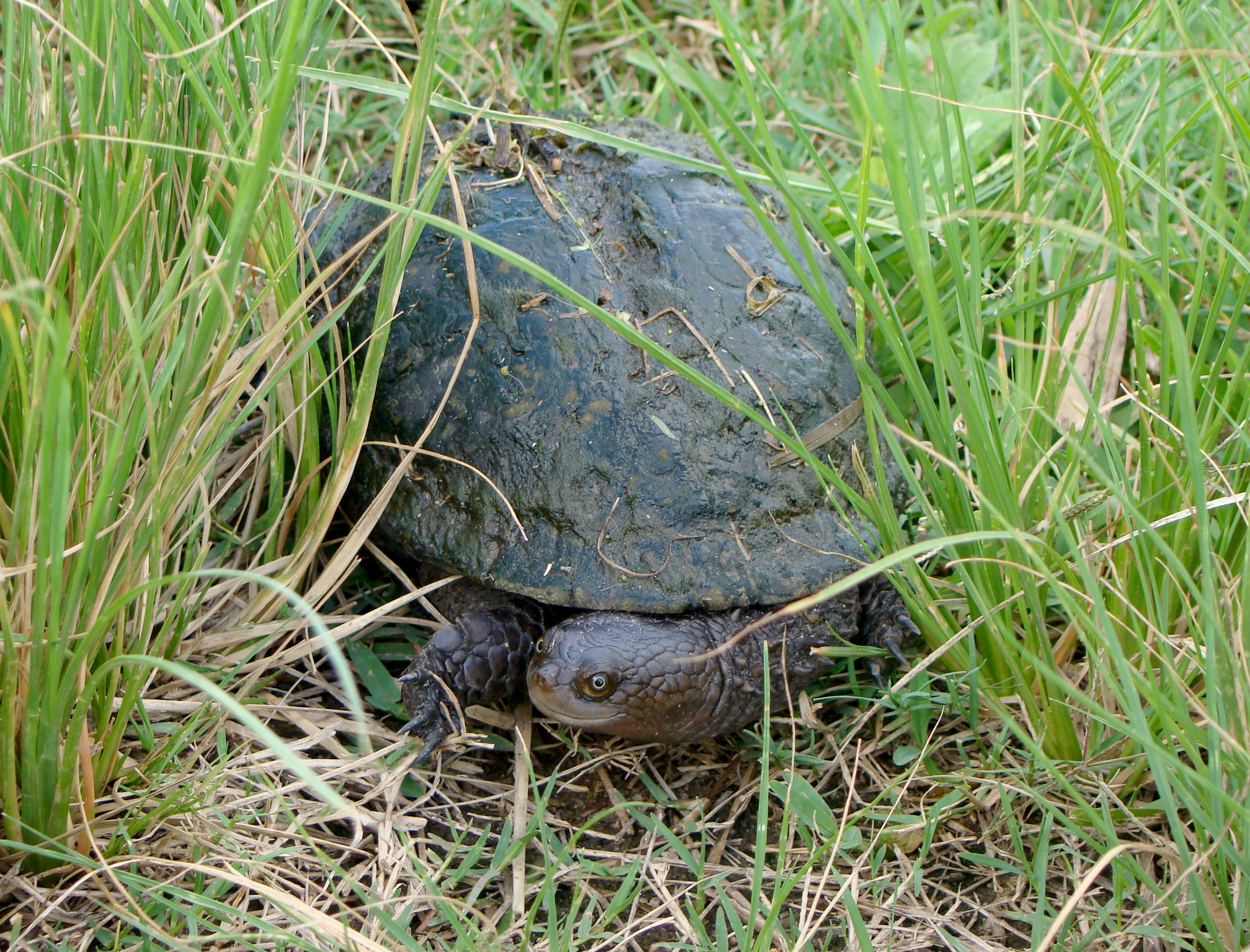

Conservation status
- Near Threatened (IUCN 2.3)

Scientific classification
- Kingdom: Animalia
- Phylum: Chordata
- Class: Reptilia
- Order: Testudines
- Suborder: Pleurodira
- Family: Chelidae
- Genus: Acanthochelys
- Species: A. spixii

Binomial name
- Acanthochelys spixii (A.M.C. Duméril & Bibron, 1835)

Synonyms
- Emys depressa Spix, 1824: 4 (junior homonym); Emys aspera Gray, 1830: 16 (10:7) (nomen dubium et oblitum); Platemys spixii A.M.C. Duméril & Bibron, 1835: 409 (nomen novum); Acanthochelys spixii — Gray, 1873: 305 (recombination)

= Black spine-neck swamp turtle =

Species of turtle

The black spine-neck swamp turtle (Acanthochelys spixii), also commonly known as the spiny-neck turtle or Spix's sideneck turtle, is a species of turtle in the family Chelidae. The species is endemic to South America, specially in the Southern Cone region.

== Etymology ==
The specific name, spixii, is in honor of German biologist Johann Baptist von Spix.

== Geographic range ==
A. spixii is found in Argentina, Brazil, Uruguay, and possibly Paraguay.
