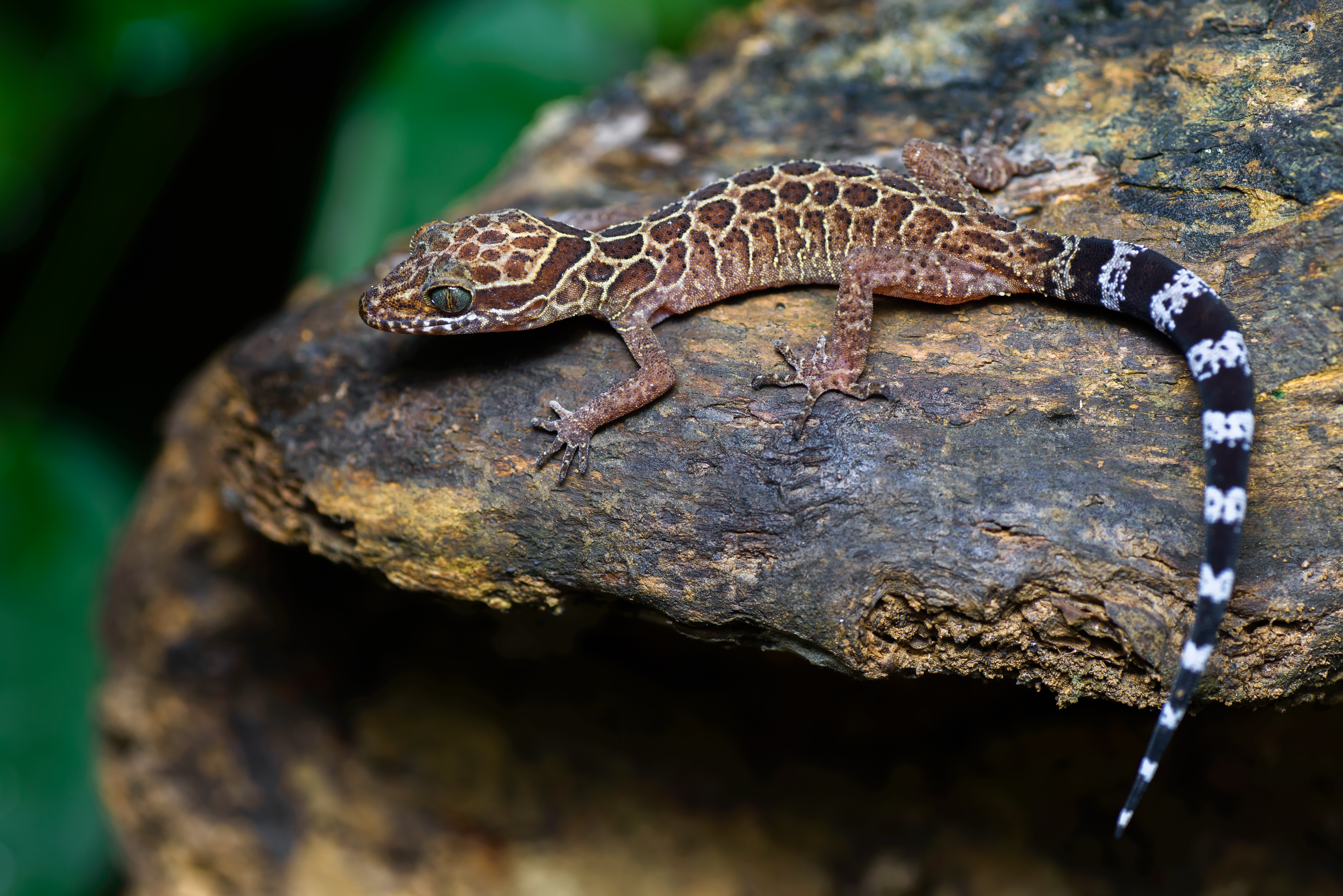

Scientific classification
- Kingdom: Animalia
- Phylum: Chordata
- Class: Reptilia
- Order: Squamata
- Suborder: Gekkota
- Family: Gekkonidae
- Genus: Cyrtodactylus
- Species: C. peguensis

Binomial name
- Cyrtodactylus peguensis (Boulenger, 1893)

Synonyms
- Gymnodactylus peguensis

= Cyrtodactylus peguensis =

Species of lizard

Cyrtodactylus peguensis, also known as the Thai bow-fingered gecko or Pegu forest gecko, is a species of gecko that is found in Thailand, western Malaysia, and Myanmar.
