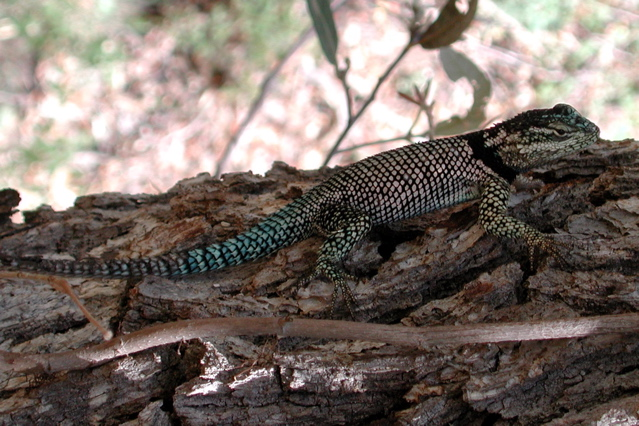

Conservation status
- Near Threatened (IUCN 3.1)

Scientific classification
- Kingdom: Animalia
- Phylum: Chordata
- Class: Reptilia
- Order: Squamata
- Suborder: Iguania
- Family: Phrynosomatidae
- Genus: Sceloporus
- Species: S. ornatus

Binomial name
- Sceloporus ornatus Baird, 1859

= Sceloporus ornatus =

Species of lizard

Sceloporus ornatus, the ornate spiny lizard, is a species of lizard in the family Phrynosomatidae. It is native to north-central Mexico. Sceloporus oberon and Sceloporus caeruleus, which were once subspecies of the ornate spiny lizard, have since been elevated to distinct species.
