= Cnemaspis heteropholis =

Conservation status
- Near Threatened (IUCN 3.1)

Scientific classification
- Kingdom: Animalia
- Phylum: Chordata
- Class: Reptilia
- Order: Squamata
- Suborder: Gekkota
- Family: Gekkonidae
- Genus: Cnemaspis
- Species: C. heteropholis

Binomial name
- Cnemaspis heteropholis Bauer, 2002

Species of lizard

Cnemaspis heteropholis, also known as the Gund day gecko or different-scaled day gecko, is a species of geckos found in India (Gund, Uttara Kannada).

The male of the species has been recently described from Agumbe in Karnataka. This Western Ghats endemic species is known from Gund, Uttara Kannada district, Pushpagiri, Dakshina Kannada district and Agumbe, Shivamoga district in Karnataka.
