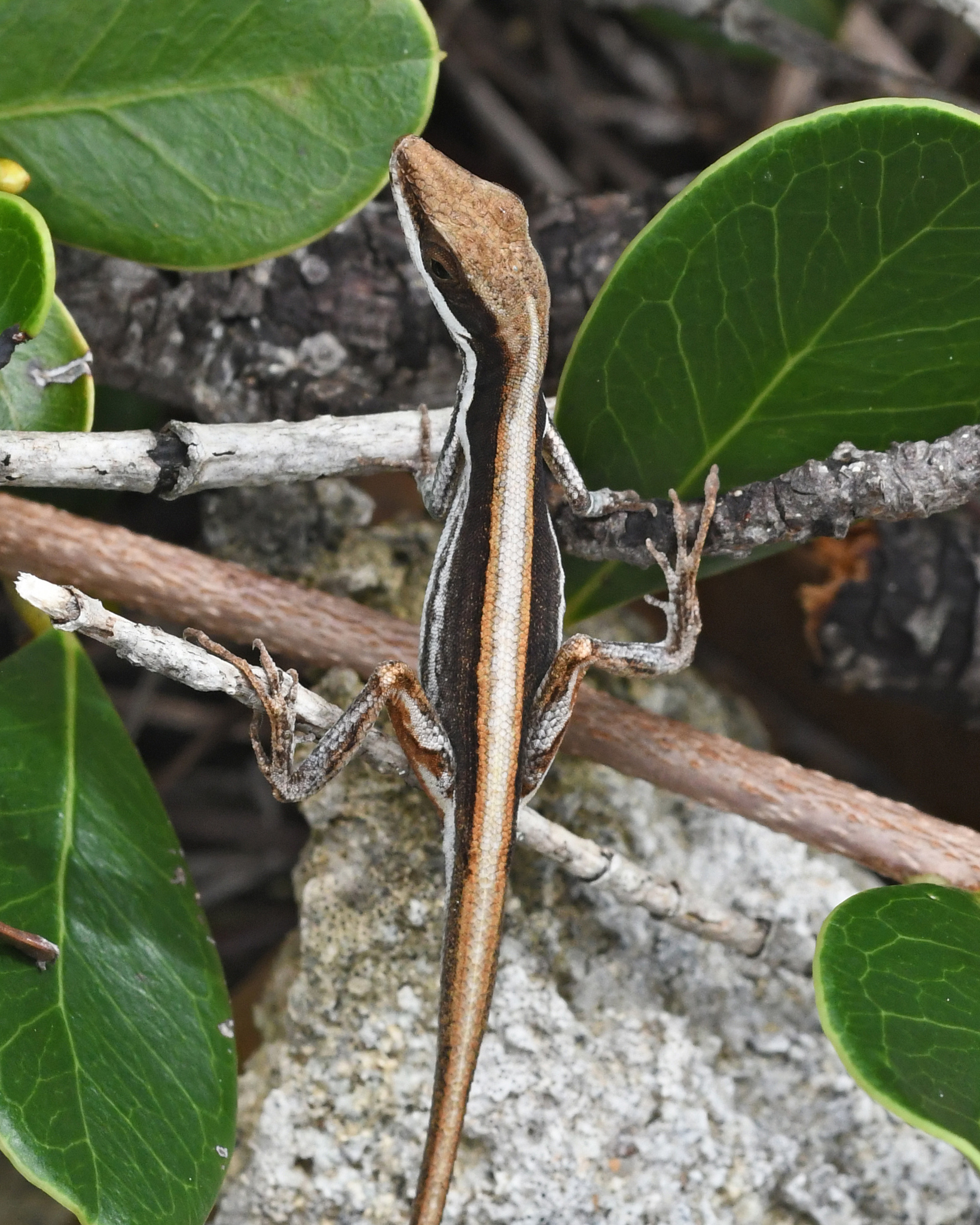

Conservation status
- Near Threatened (IUCN 3.1)

Scientific classification
- Kingdom: Animalia
- Phylum: Chordata
- Class: Reptilia
- Order: Squamata
- Suborder: Iguania
- Family: Dactyloidae
- Genus: Anolis
- Species: A. alumina

Binomial name
- Anolis alumina Hertz, 1976

= Anolis alumina =

Species of lizard

Anolis alumina, the Barahona grass anole or shiny anole, is a species of lizard in the family Dactyloidae. The species is found in Hispaniola.
