= Cyrtodactylus bhupathyi =

Scientific classification
- Kingdom: Animalia
- Phylum: Chordata
- Order: Squamata
- Suborder: Gekkota
- Family: Gekkonidae
- Genus: Cyrtodactylus
- Species: C. bhupathyi

Binomial name
- Cyrtodactylus bhupathyi Agarwal, Mahony, Giri, Chaitanya & Bauer, 2018

Species of lizard

Cyrtodactylus bhupathyi is a species of lizard in the family Gekkonidae. The species is endemic to India.

== Etymology ==
The specific name, bhupathyi, is in honor of Indian herpetologist Subramaniam Bhupathy.

== Geographic range ==
C. bhupathyi is found in West Bengal, East India.

== Description ==
Small for its genus, C. bhupathyi may attain a snout-to-vent length (SVL) of 6 cm (2.4 in).
