= Ponmudi day gecko =

Conservation status
- Near Threatened (IUCN 3.1)

Scientific classification
- Kingdom: Animalia
- Phylum: Chordata
- Class: Reptilia
- Order: Squamata
- Suborder: Gekkota
- Family: Gekkonidae
- Genus: Cnemaspis
- Species: C. nairi

Binomial name
- Cnemaspis nairi Inger, Marx & Koshy, 1984

Species of lizard

The Ponmudi day gecko (Cnemaspis nairi), also known commonly as the Ponmudi rock gecko, is a species of lizard in the family Gekkonidae. The species is endemic to India.

== Etymology ==
The specific name, nairi, is in honor of Indian naturalist S. Madhavan Nair.

== Geographic range ==
Cnemaspis nairi is found in the Indian state of Kerala. The holotype, from which the species was originally described, was collected at Ponmudi.

== Habitat ==
The preferred habitat of Cnemaspis nairi is evergreen forests and semi-evergreen forests at elevations of 280 to 925 m (919 to 3,035 ft).

== Description ==
Cnemaspis nairi may attain a snout-to-vent length (SVL) of 40 mm (1.6 in). Dorsally, it is gray with black and white markings. Ventrally, it is grayish brown. The tail has alternating rings of black and yellowish olive.

== Reproduction ==
Cnemaspis nairi is oviparous.
