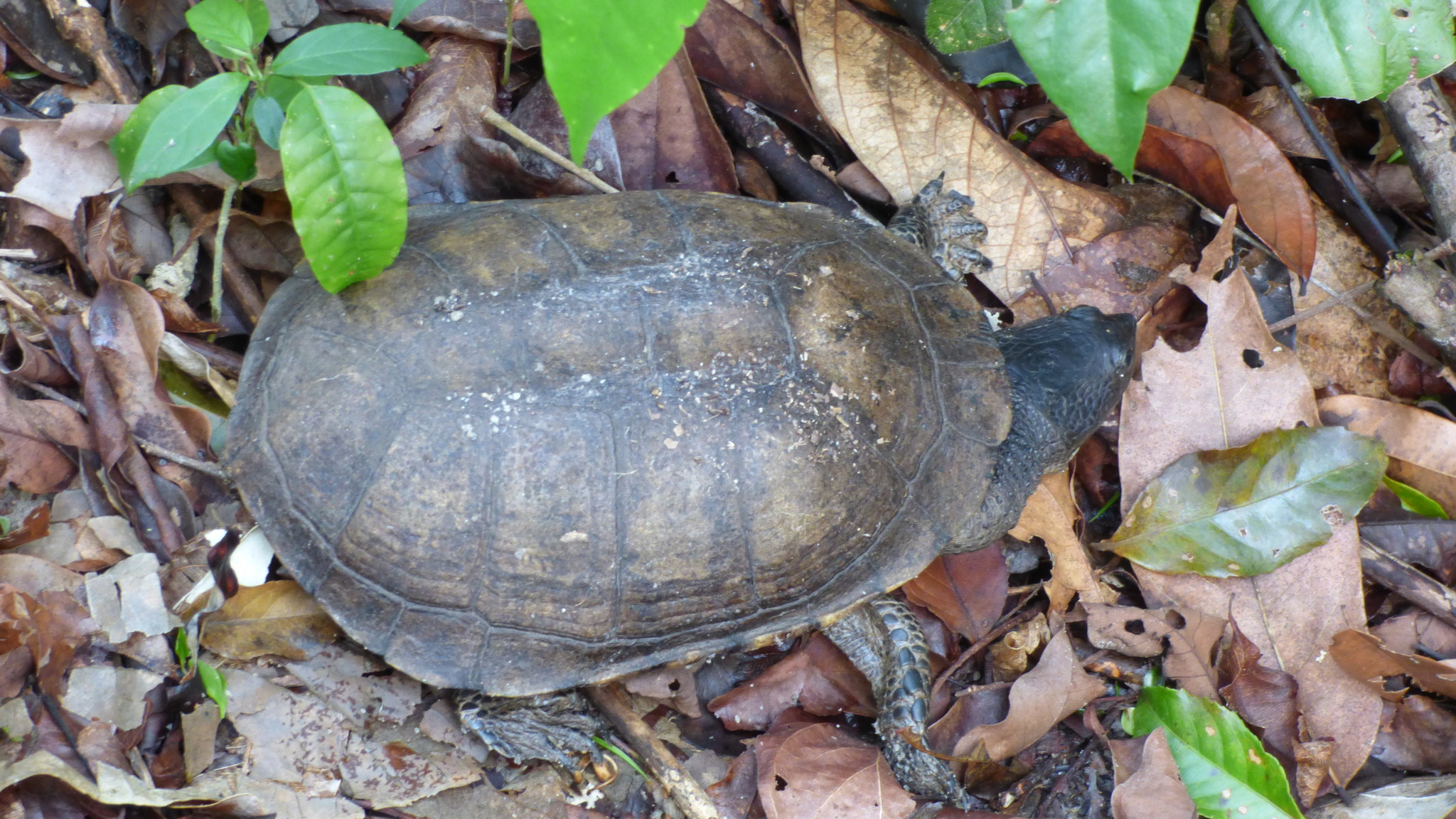

Conservation status
- Near Threatened (IUCN 3.1)

Scientific classification
- Kingdom: Animalia
- Phylum: Chordata
- Class: Reptilia
- Order: Testudines
- Suborder: Pleurodira
- Family: Chelidae
- Genus: Acanthochelys
- Species: A. radiolata

Binomial name
- Acanthochelys radiolata (Mikan, 1820)

Synonyms
- Emys radiolata Mikan, 1820; Platemys gaudichaudii Duméril and Bibron, 1835; Platemys werneri Schnee, 1900; Platemys radiolata quadrisquamosa Luederwaldt, 1926; Platemys radiolata raiolata Mikan, 1820

= Brazilian radiolated swamp turtle =

Species of turtle

The Brazilian radiolated swamp turtle (Acanthochelys radiolata) is a species of turtle in the Chelidae family endemic to Brazil.
