= Sikkimese bent-toed gecko =

Conservation status
- Data Deficient (IUCN 3.1)

Scientific classification
- Kingdom: Animalia
- Phylum: Chordata
- Class: Reptilia
- Order: Squamata
- Suborder: Gekkota
- Family: Gekkonidae
- Genus: Cyrtodactylus
- Species: C. gubernatoris

Binomial name
- Cyrtodactylus gubernatoris (Annandale, 1913)

Species of lizard

The Sikkimese bent-toed gecko (Cyrtodactylus gubernatoris) is a species of gecko found in Darjeeling, India.
