= Adolfus kibonotensis =

Scientific classification
- Domain: Eukaryota
- Kingdom: Animalia
- Phylum: Chordata
- Class: Reptilia
- Order: Squamata
- Family: Lacertidae
- Genus: Adolfus
- Species: A. kibonotensis

Binomial name
- Adolfus kibonotensis (Lönnberg, 1907)

Synonyms
- Lacerta jacksoni kibonotensis Lönnberg, 1907

Species of lizard

Adolfus kibonotensis, also known as Jackson's forest lizard (vernacular name shared with Adolfus jacksoni), is a species of lizard found in Kenya and Tanzania. It was originally described as a subspecies of Adolfus jacksoni in 1907 before being reduced into a synonym, but was resurrected as a full species in 2018.
