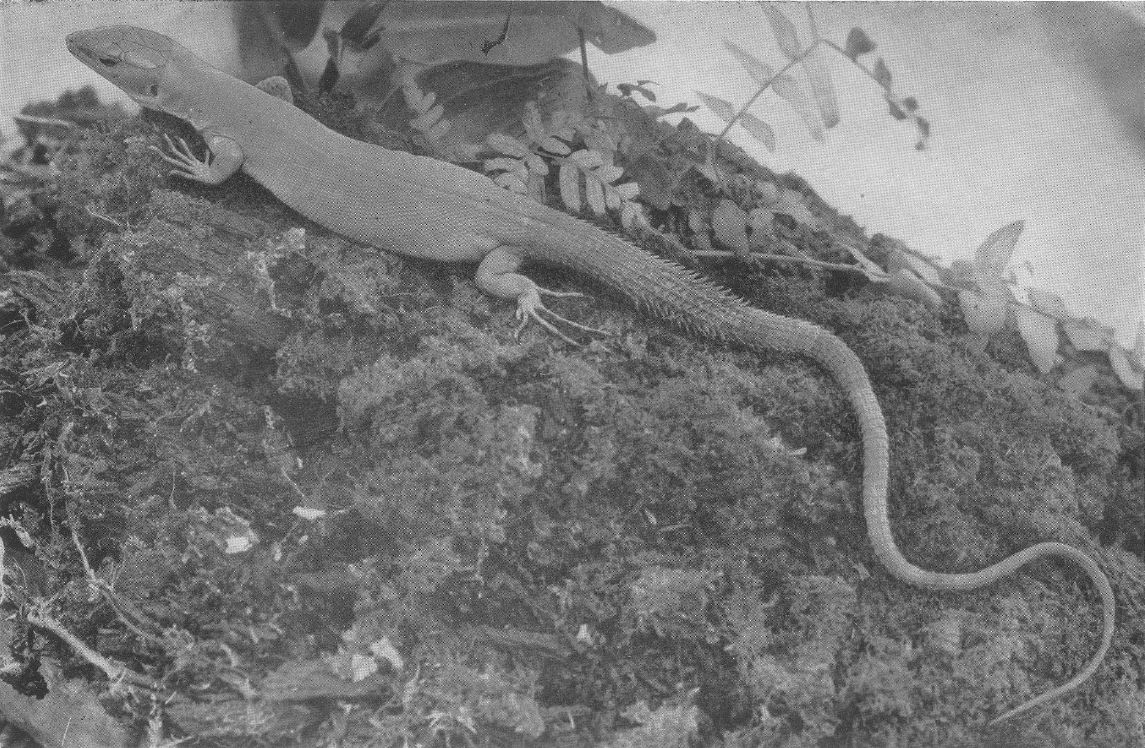
- Gastropholis echinata

Scientific classification
- Kingdom: Animalia
- Phylum: Chordata
- Class: Reptilia
- Order: Squamata
- Family: Lacertidae
- Subfamily: Lacertinae
- Genus: Gastropholis; Fischer, 1886

Species
- See text.

= Gastropholis =

Genus of lizards

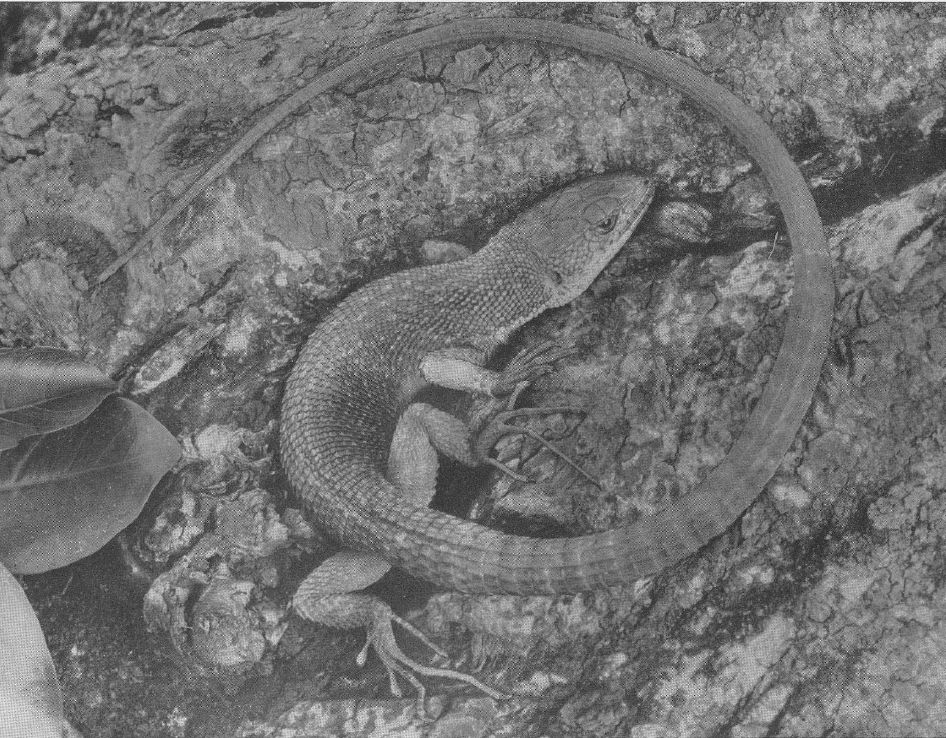
Gastropholis tropidopholis

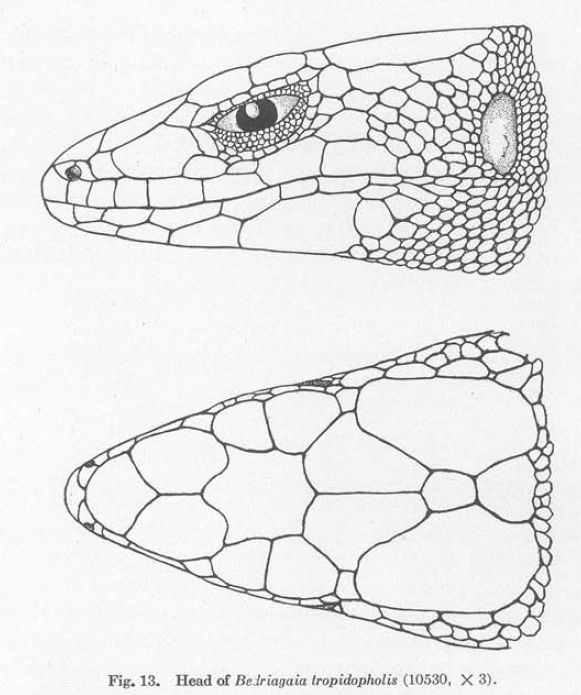
Head of Gastropholis tropidopholis

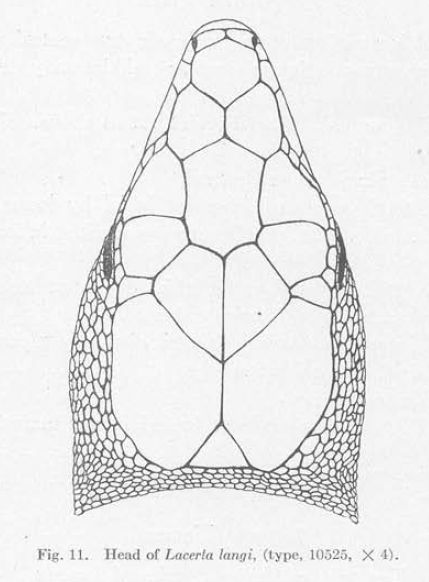
Head of Gastropholis echinata

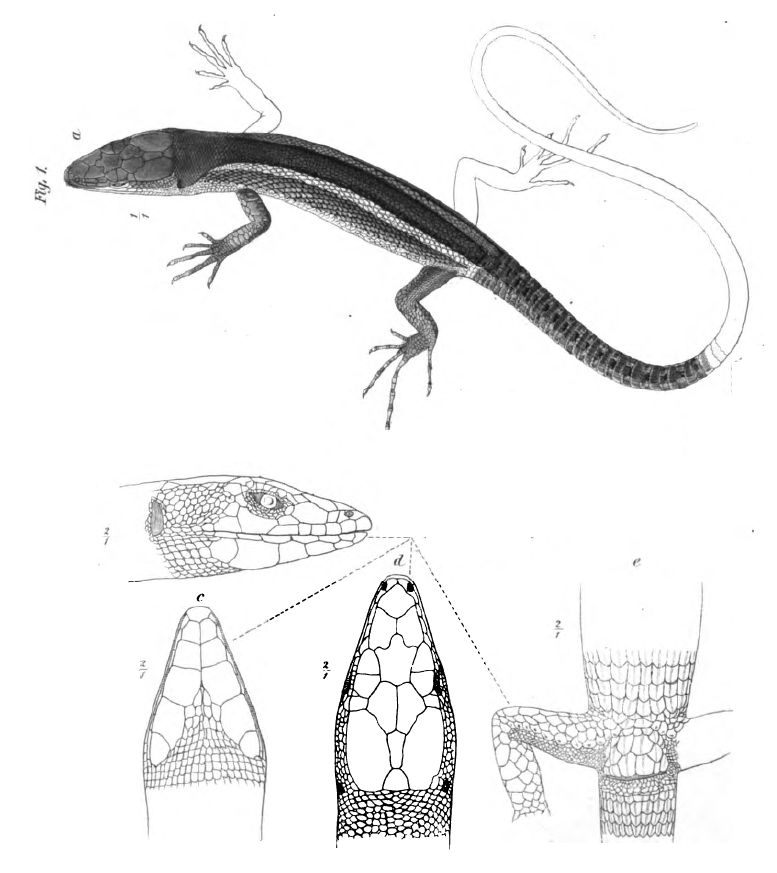
Gastropholis vittata

Gastropholis is a genus of Equatorial African lacertid lizards of the family Lacertidae which is distributed in southern Liberia, Ivory Coast and Ghana, western Cameroon, Equatorial Guinea, Democratic Republic of Congo, eastern Kenya, Tanzania and south to northeastern Mozambique.

== Etymology ==
Gastropholis is derived from the ancient Greek words "gaster" (γαστήρ) which means "belly, stomach" and, "pholis" (φολῐ́ς), a "horny scale of a reptile". The common name of these lizards is Keel-bellied Lizards.

== Habitat and natural history ==
Not much is known but all species of this genus are diurnal, arboreal and often secretive. They inhabit forests, woodland and thicket of coastal plains from sea level to 2000 m altitude. Usually they live high up in the trees 10 m or more above ground level and hide in holes or under loose bark. For sun-basking and feeding (insects and other arthropods, also smaller lizards) they move on branches using their prehensile tails as balancing organs.

Eggs are laid in moist tree holes. Gastropholis prasina is known to produce clutches of five-ten eggs. At 26-29 °C incubation temperature the eggs hatched after 61 days.

== Diagnosis ==
Gastropholis shares with the other genera of Equatorial African lacertids (EAL; Adolfus, Congolacerta, Holaspis) the consistently absent parietal foramen, the parietal scale extending to the edge of the parietal table and a single postnasal scale.

The species of Gastropholis are characterized by a high ventral scale count (10-14 rows, other EAL only 6 rows transversely), keeled ventrals (smooth in all other EAL), and a long prehensile tail. Gastropholis species are the largest of the EAL clade with adult snout-vent lengths of 80–110 mm. They are well adapted for climbing with their long limbs, hooked claws and long tails. For a key to the species of Gastropholis see Arnold (1989).

== Species ==
Four species are recognized:

- Gastropholis echinata (Cope, 1862)
- Gastropholis prasina (Werner, 1904) - green keel-bellied lizard
- Gastropholis tropidopholis (Boulenger, 1916)
- Gastropholis vittata (Fischer, 1886) - keelbelly ground lizard
