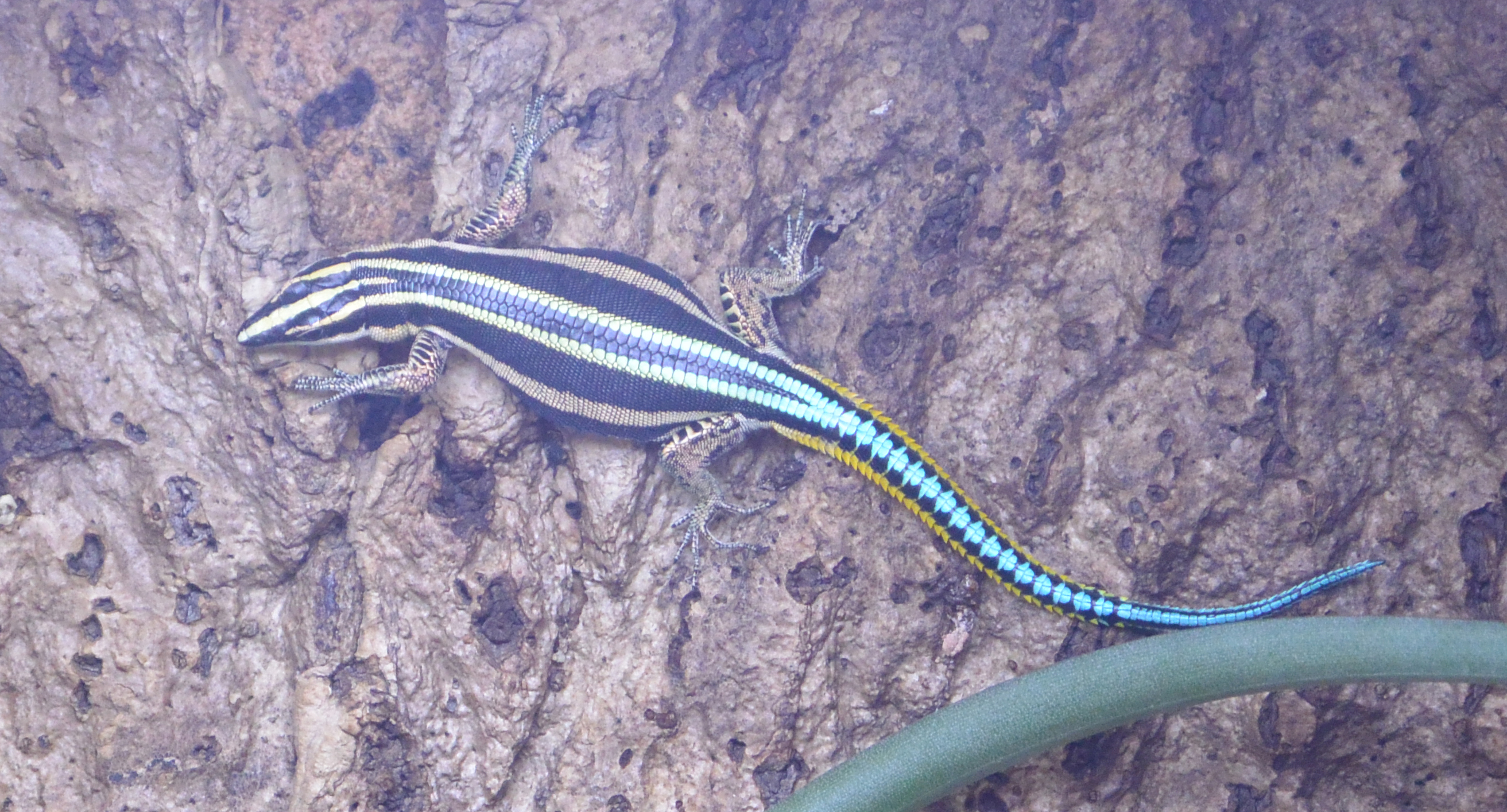

Conservation status
- Least Concern (IUCN 3.1)

Scientific classification
- Kingdom: Animalia
- Phylum: Chordata
- Class: Reptilia
- Order: Squamata
- Family: Lacertidae
- Genus: Holaspis
- Species: H. laevis

Binomial name
- Holaspis laevis Werner, 1896

Synonyms
- Holaspis guentheri laevis Werner, 1896

= Holaspis laevis =

Species of lizard

Holaspis laevis, also known as the eastern serrate-toed tree lizard, is a species of lizard occurring in Kenya, Tanzania, Malawi, and Mozambique. H. laevis was formerly a subspecies of H. guentheri.

== Etymology ==
The Latin word "laevis " means smooth.

== Vivarium keeping ==
Nearly all Holaspis in the pet trade are H. laevis. Captive breeding resulted in an increase of information on the biology of Holaspis.

In the "Cologne Aquarium" a female of H. laevis from Tanzania laid one to two eggs on 14 November, 22 December, 24 February and 5 April. Only one egg hatched after 54 days of incubation. Incubation of eggs was more successfully by Kroniger & Bosch (2001). Females of H. laevis deposited eggs under the bark. Clutch almost always consisted of two eggs, rarely only one egg was laid by younger females. They produced clutches every four to six weeks during the year. Egg size at oviposition was (6.0–7.2) mm x (11.3–12.9) mm and their mass (0.30–0.38) g. At 29 °C (84 °F) the incubation time was 55 to 57 days. Hatchlings measured 21 to 24 mm (0.83 to 0.94 in) in snout-to-vent length and 30 to 35 mm (1.2 to 1.4 in) in tail length and had a mass of 0.23 to 0.25 g. Sexual maturity is reached in 1.5 to 2 years in captivity.
