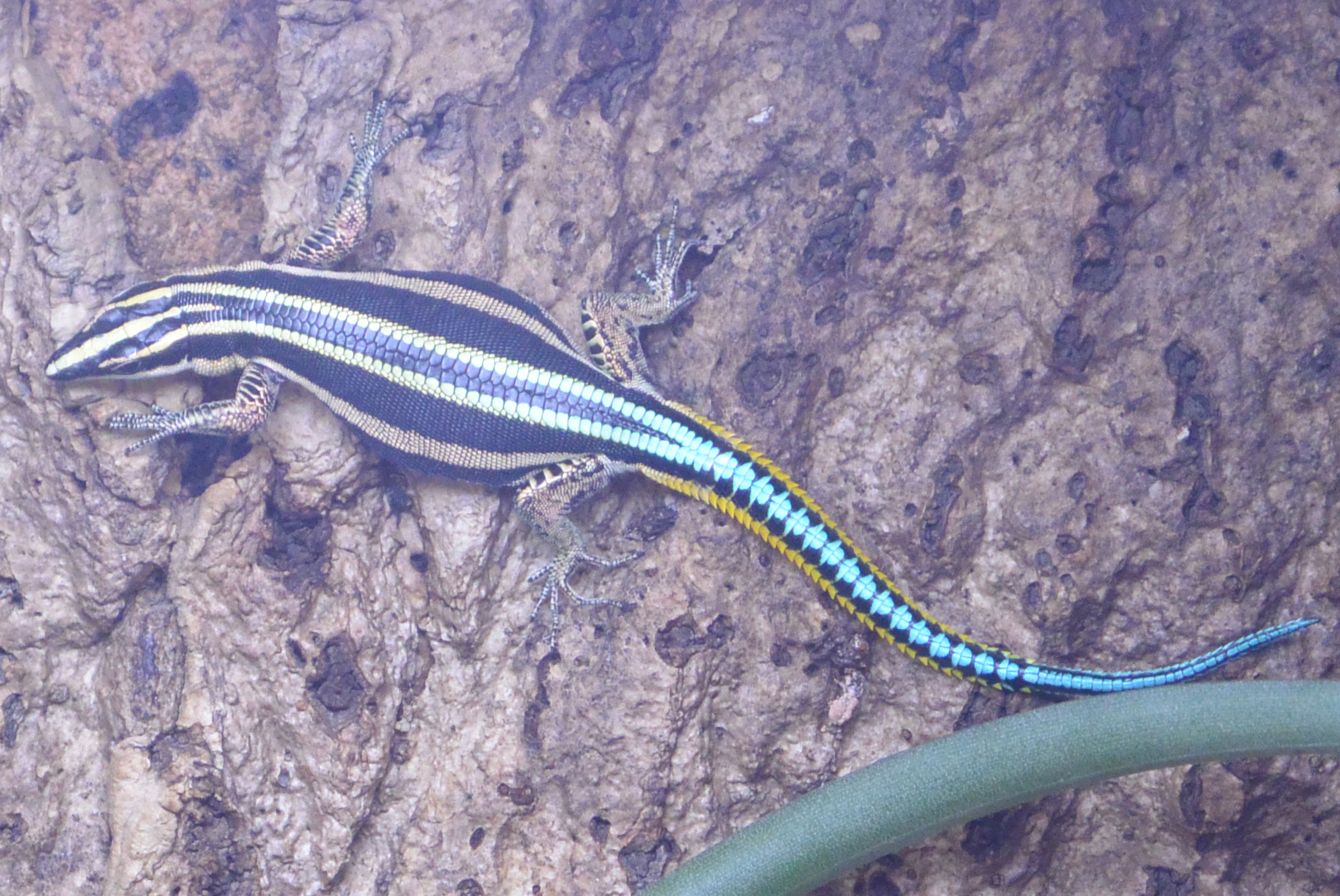
- Holaspis laevis
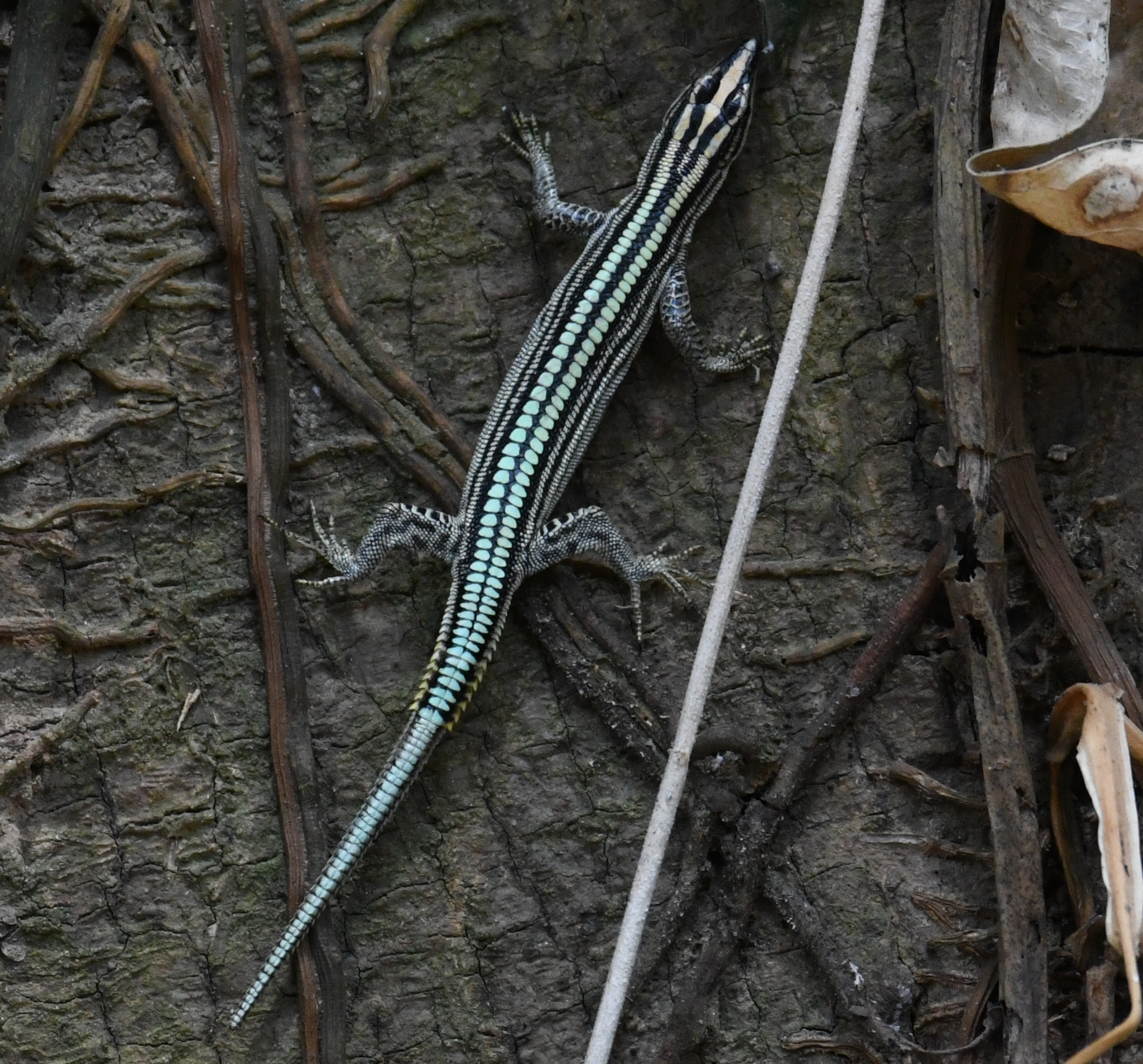
- Holaspis guentheri

Scientific classification
- Kingdom: Animalia
- Phylum: Chordata
- Class: Reptilia
- Order: Squamata
- Family: Lacertidae
- Subfamily: Lacertinae
- Genus: Holaspis; Gray, 1863

Species
- 2., see text.

= Holaspis =

Genus of lizards

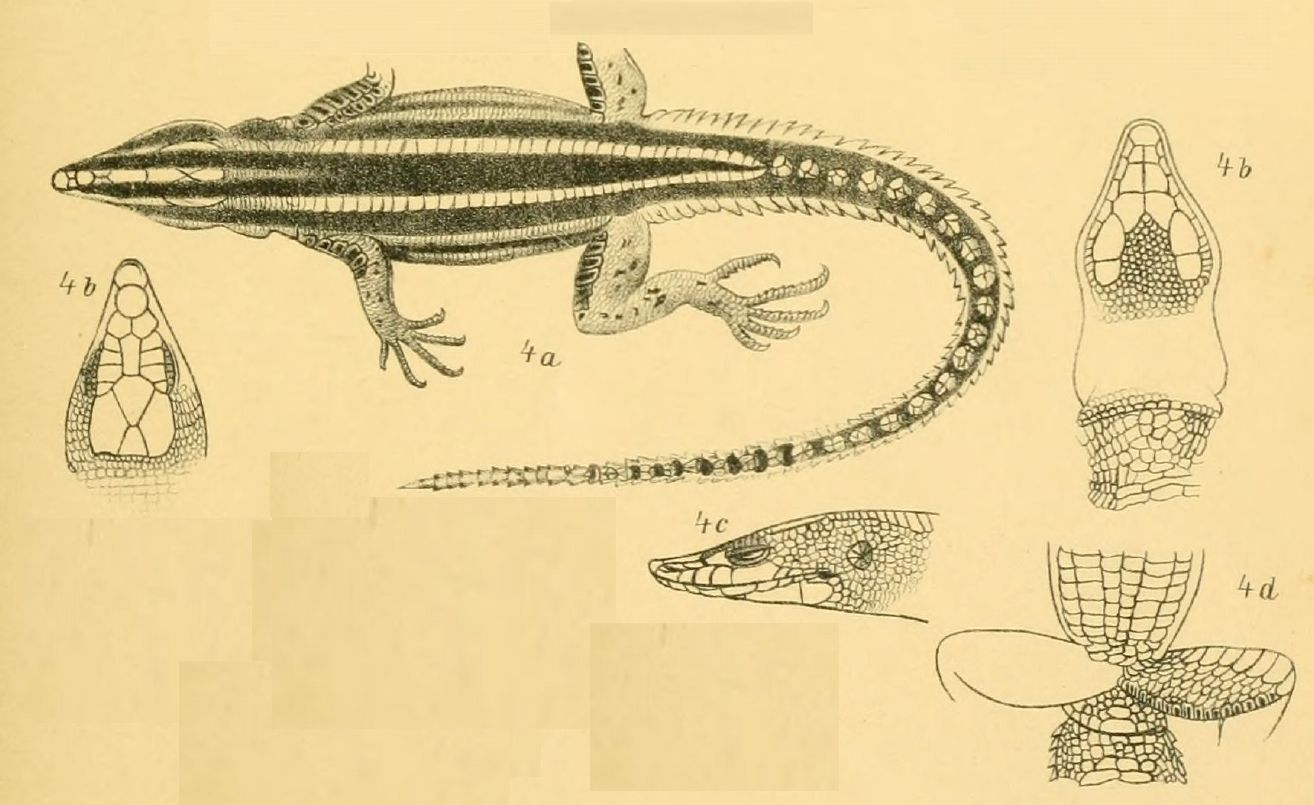
Holaspis laevis F. Werner, 1895

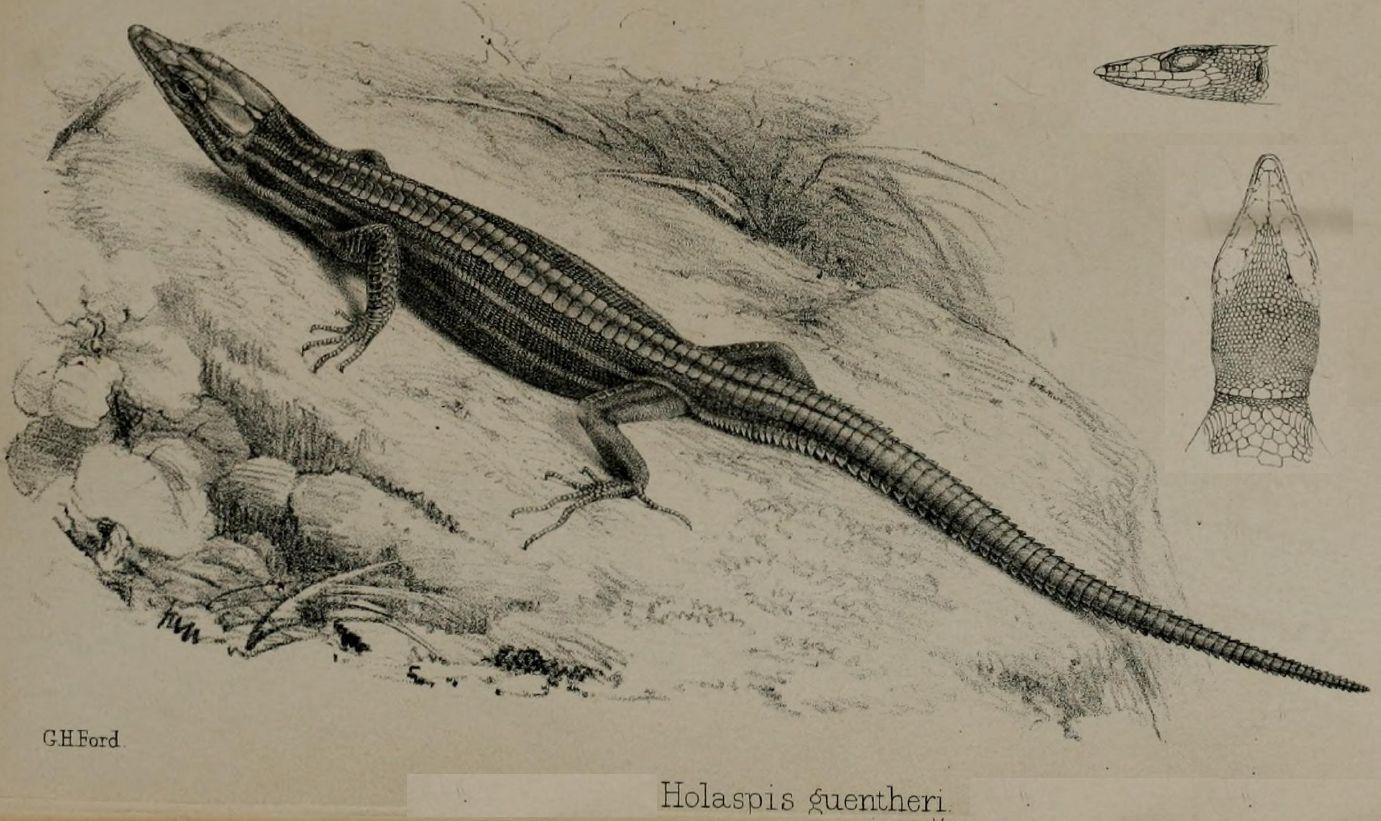
Holaspis guentheri Gray, 1863

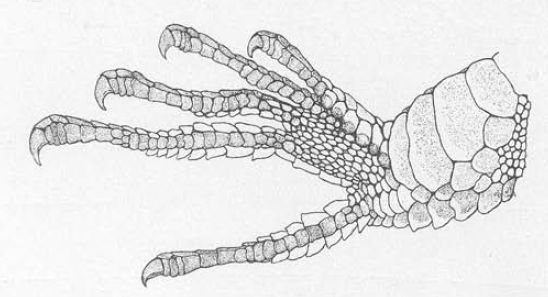
Hind foot of Holaspis guentheri

Holaspis is a genus of equatorial African lizards in the family Lacertidae. These lizards are capable of gliding flight for distances of 30 meters (98 feet).

== Etymology ==
The Neo-Latin word "Holaspis " is derived from the Greek words "aspis", ἀσπίς (= a buckler, or round shield) and "holos", ὅλος, ὅλως (= whole, all, complete). It refers to the head scalation with frontoparietal and occipital scales all fused.

== Description ==
In morphology-based parsimony and compatibility analyses Arnold (1989) recognized a clade called the "Equatorial African group" including Adolfus, Gastropholis, and Holaspis. In all lacertids of this clade the parietal foramen is consistently absent, the parietal scale extends to the edge of the parietal table, and the postnasal scale is single. In Holaspis the head and body are very depressed, frontoparietal and occipital scales are all fused to shields, the tail is depressed with lateral fringes of scales, and the third and fourth toes of the forefoot are fused for nearly their entire joint. There are two longitudinal rows of smooth broad band-like scales down the vertebral line of the back and on the tail. The ventral scales are smooth. The collar is composed of 9 to 15 small scales. 16 to 24 femoral pores are present, more developed in males. Maximum total length (including tail) in both species is 129 mm (5.1 in), and maximum snout-vent-length (SVL) is 53 mm (2.1 in). There is no sexual dimorphism in SVL, but males have larger heads and their tail base is wider.

Dorsally the ground colour is black. On the head from the tip of the snout to the nape of the neck there is a yellow to yellow greenish median line. On each side of the back outside the large dorsal scales there runs a turquoise to sky blue longitudinal stripe which fuses on the tail base. From there it travels as a clear blue stripe partly interrupted onto the tip of the tail. The pattern of the flanks differs in the two species: In H. guentheri there are two yellowish brown to greyish lines on the flanks while in H. laevis there runs only one broader yellowish brown to red brown or usually beige stripe from the tip of the snout to the hind limb. The wide tail scales on the sides are yellow to orange-coloured.

The number of light or dark stripes is the only known external morphological difference between the two species. As Arnold (1989) wrote: H. guentheri: "A dark vertebral stripe on body and three dark stripes on each side". H. laevis: "A dark vertebral stripe and two dark stripes on each side".

Ventrally the lizards are coloured yellow or orange to greenish-orange, partly with a mother-of-pearl shimmer. Males are often more brightly coloured. Juveniles resemble their parents but the coloured dorsal stripes are narrower and less intensely coloured. Ventrally the juveniles are pitch-black in contrast to the adults.

== Species ==
Two species are recognized as being valid. Formerly H. laevis was a subspecies of H. guentheri.

Image	Species	Common name
	Holaspis guentheri Gray, 1863	Western neon blue-tailed tree lizard
	Holaspis laevis F. Werner, 1895	Eastern neon blue-tailed tree lizard

== Habitat and natural history ==
Holaspis are diurnal, arboreal, extremely agil lacertids and able to move on vertical and overhanging surfaces with body and tail pressed closely to the surface. They live on larger trees at least 15 m (49 ft) above the forest floor in primary forest, man-influenzed areas and even in Eucalyptus forest with smooth bark but are not found in closed forest. The serrated tail is considered as an additional tree climbing adaption to increase grip.

They are active hunters of small insects and other arthropods like ants, grasshoppers and spiders, often investigating crevices in which they also frequently hide.

Not much is known about the reproduction in nature. More than one clutch/year is produced. Females lay two eggs under loose bark or in leaf litter. Specimen from northeastern Democratic Republic of Congo laid eggs in June and females from Nyasaland caught on 3 August held two well developed eggs.

== Flight ==
The species of Holaspis are unique among lacertids in being capable of gliding flight between trees up to 30 m distance. Adaptions for gliding are the flat body and tail, the fused fingers and their low body mass. Their bones are packed full of air spaces, making the lizard's skeleton feather light for gliding.

Like many other lacertids, Holaspis flattens its body when basking by rotating the dorsal ribs forward. In Holaspis however, this same behaviour was exapted for flight, spreading and flattening the body until it is round like a coin.

They are less specialized for flight than species of the agamid genus Draco or gekkonid genus Ptychozoon.

== Vivarium keeping ==
Holaspis species are occasionally kept as pets. But Holaspis guentheri and H. laevis are often confused in pet trade or generally named H. guentheri because H. laevis was formerly only a subspecies of H. guentheri. Nearly all Holaspis in the pet trade are H. laevis. For discrimination of the two species see "Description". Captive breeding resulted in an increase of information on the biology of Holaspis.
