= Adolfus masavaensis =

Conservation status
- Near Threatened (IUCN 3.1)

Scientific classification
- Kingdom: Animalia
- Phylum: Chordata
- Class: Reptilia
- Order: Squamata
- Family: Lacertidae
- Genus: Adolfus
- Species: A. masavaensis

Binomial name
- Adolfus masavaensis Wagner, Greenbaum & Branch, 2014

Species of lizard

Adolfus masavaensis, also known as the western alpine meadow lizard, is a species of lizard. It is known from the Aberdare Mountains in Kenya and Mount Elgon on the Kenya/Uganda border. It is a moorland species found at high elevations, 2,896–3,372 m (9,501–11,063 ft) above sea level.

Adolfus masavaensis is a small species within its genus, measuring 39–56 mm (1.5–2.2 in) in snout–vent length.
