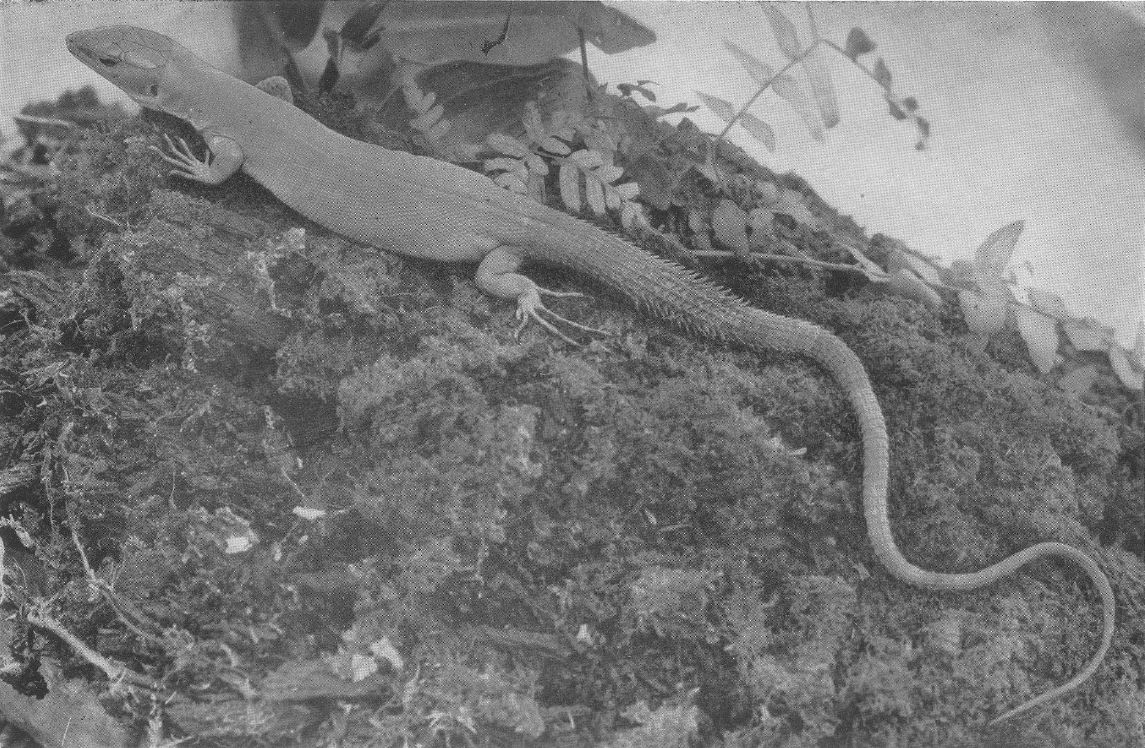

Scientific classification
- Kingdom: Animalia
- Phylum: Chordata
- Class: Reptilia
- Order: Squamata
- Family: Lacertidae
- Genus: Gastropholis
- Species: G. echinata

Binomial name
- Gastropholis echinata (Cope, 1862)

= Gastropholis echinata =

Species of lizard

Gastropholis echinata, the hedgehog gastropholis, is a species of lizard found in Liberia, Ivory Coast, Ghana, Cameroon, Equatorial Guinea, Gabon, and the Democratic Republic of the Congo.

The Latin specific epithet of echinata refers to hedgehog, from echinus.
