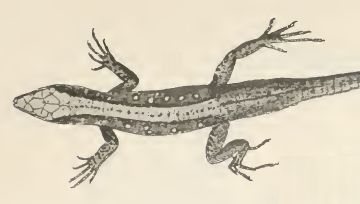

Conservation status
- Least Concern (IUCN 3.1)

Scientific classification
- Kingdom: Animalia
- Phylum: Chordata
- Class: Reptilia
- Order: Squamata
- Family: Lacertidae
- Genus: Congolacerta
- Species: C. vauereselli

Binomial name
- Congolacerta vauereselli (Tornier, 1902)

Synonyms
- Lacerta vauereselli Tornier, 1902; Lacerta (Zootoca) vauereselli — de Witte & Laurent, 1942; Adolfus vauereselli — Arnold, 1973; Congolacerta vauereselli — Greenbaum et al., 2011

= Congolacerta vauereselli =

Species of lizard

Congolacerta vauereselli, also known commonly as the sparse-scaled forest lizard, is a species of lizard in the family Lacertidae. The species is native to central Africa.

== Etymology ==
Tornier (1902) did not explain the source of the specific name vauereselli.

== Geographic range ==
C. vauereselli is found in Burundi, Democratic Republic of Congo, Rwanda, Tanzania, and Uganda.

== Habitat ==
The preferred natural Habitat of C. vauereselli is forest, at altitudes of 1,000–2,400 m (3,300–7,900 ft).

== Reproduction ==
- C. vauereselli is oviparous.
