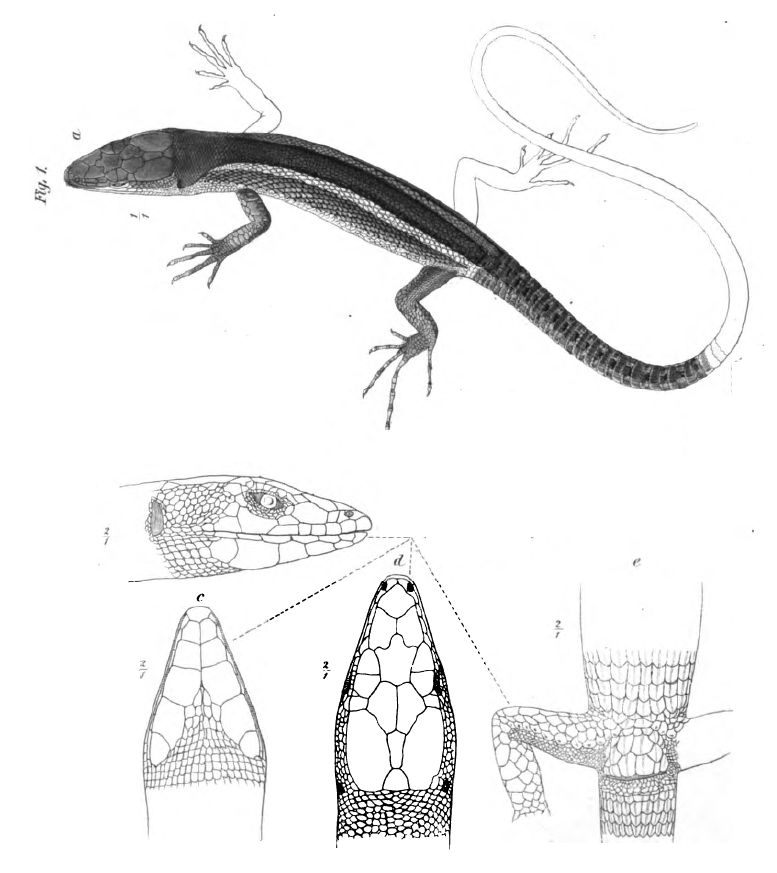

Scientific classification
- Domain: Eukaryota
- Kingdom: Animalia
- Phylum: Chordata
- Class: Reptilia
- Order: Squamata
- Family: Lacertidae
- Genus: Gastropholis
- Species: G. vittata

Binomial name
- Gastropholis vittata (Fischer, 1886)

= Gastropholis vittata =

Species of lizard

Gastropholis vittata also known as the keelbelly ground lizard, is a species of lizard found in Tanzania, Mozambique, and Kenya.
