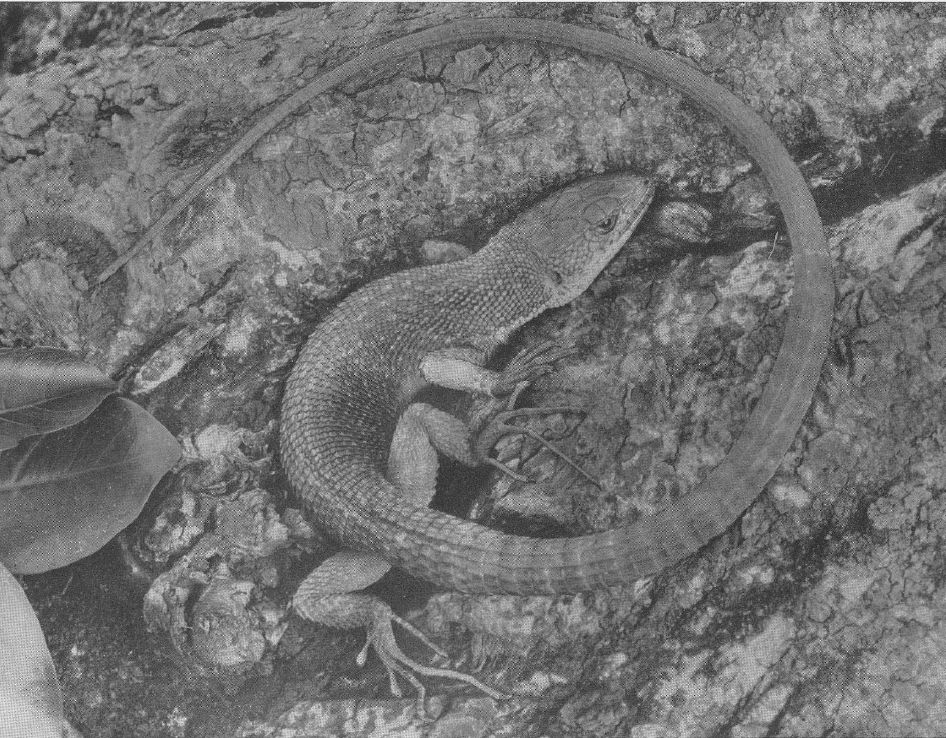

Scientific classification
- Kingdom: Animalia
- Phylum: Chordata
- Class: Reptilia
- Order: Squamata
- Family: Lacertidae
- Genus: Gastropholis
- Species: G. tropidopholis

Binomial name
- Gastropholis tropidopholis (Boulenger, 1916)

= Gastropholis tropidopholis =

Species of lizard

Gastropholis tropidopholis is a species of lizard endemic to the Democratic Republic of the Congo.
