= Adolfus alleni =

Conservation status
- Near Threatened (IUCN 3.1)

Scientific classification
- Kingdom: Animalia
- Phylum: Chordata
- Class: Reptilia
- Order: Squamata
- Family: Lacertidae
- Genus: Adolfus
- Species: A. alleni

Binomial name
- Adolfus alleni (Barbour, 1914)

Synonyms
- Adolfus alleni Barbour, 1914; Adolfus alleni — Spawls & Rotich, 1997

Species of lizard

Adolfus alleni, also known commonly as the alpine meadow lizard or the alpine-meadow lizard, is a species of lizard in the family Lacertidae. The species is endemic to Kenya.

== Habitat and geographic range ==
A. alleni is found in alpine moorlands (shrubland) of Mount Kenya, Mount Elgon, and the Aberdares Mountains in Kenya, and in clearings in bamboo forest on Mount Kenya, at altitudes of 2,400–4,500 m (7,900–14,800 ft).

== Description ==
Medium-sized for the genus Adolfus, adults of A. alleni have a snout-to-vent length (SVL) of about 6 cm (2.4 in).

== Behavior ==
A. alleni is terrestrial and diurnal.

== Reproduction ==
A. alleni is oviparous.

== Etymology ==
The specific name, alleni, is in honor of American zoologist Glover Morrill Allen.
