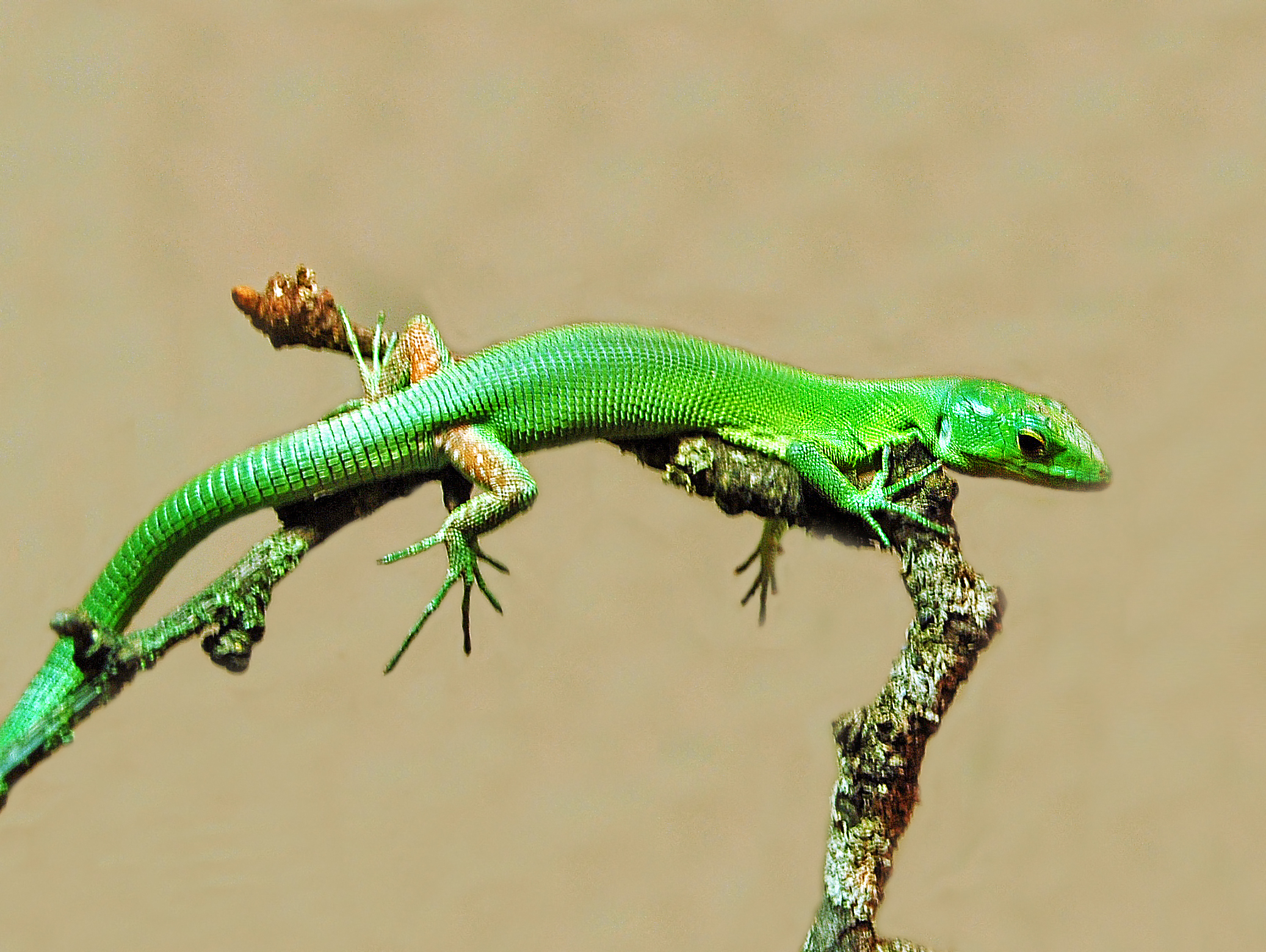

Conservation status
- Near Threatened (IUCN 3.1)

Scientific classification
- Kingdom: Animalia
- Phylum: Chordata
- Class: Reptilia
- Order: Squamata
- Suborder: Lacertoidea
- Family: Lacertidae
- Genus: Gastropholis
- Species: G. prasina

Binomial name
- Gastropholis prasina (Werner, 1904)
- The range of Gastropholis prasina on the coast of Tanzania and Kenya, shown in red

Synonyms
- Bedriagaia moreaui Loveridge, 1936

= Gastropholis prasina =

Green keel-bellied lizard

Species of lizard

Gastropholis prasina, the green keel-bellied lizard, is a species of lizard belonging to the family Lacertidae.

== Distribution ==
This species is native to areas in the coastal plain of Kenya and Tanzania.

== Habitat ==
G. prasina inhabits forests, woodland and thickets of the coastal plain. It has been found both close to the ground and higher in the canopy, where it is thought to use small branches as perches. It has been observed sleeping on branches, supported by its large tail.

== Description ==
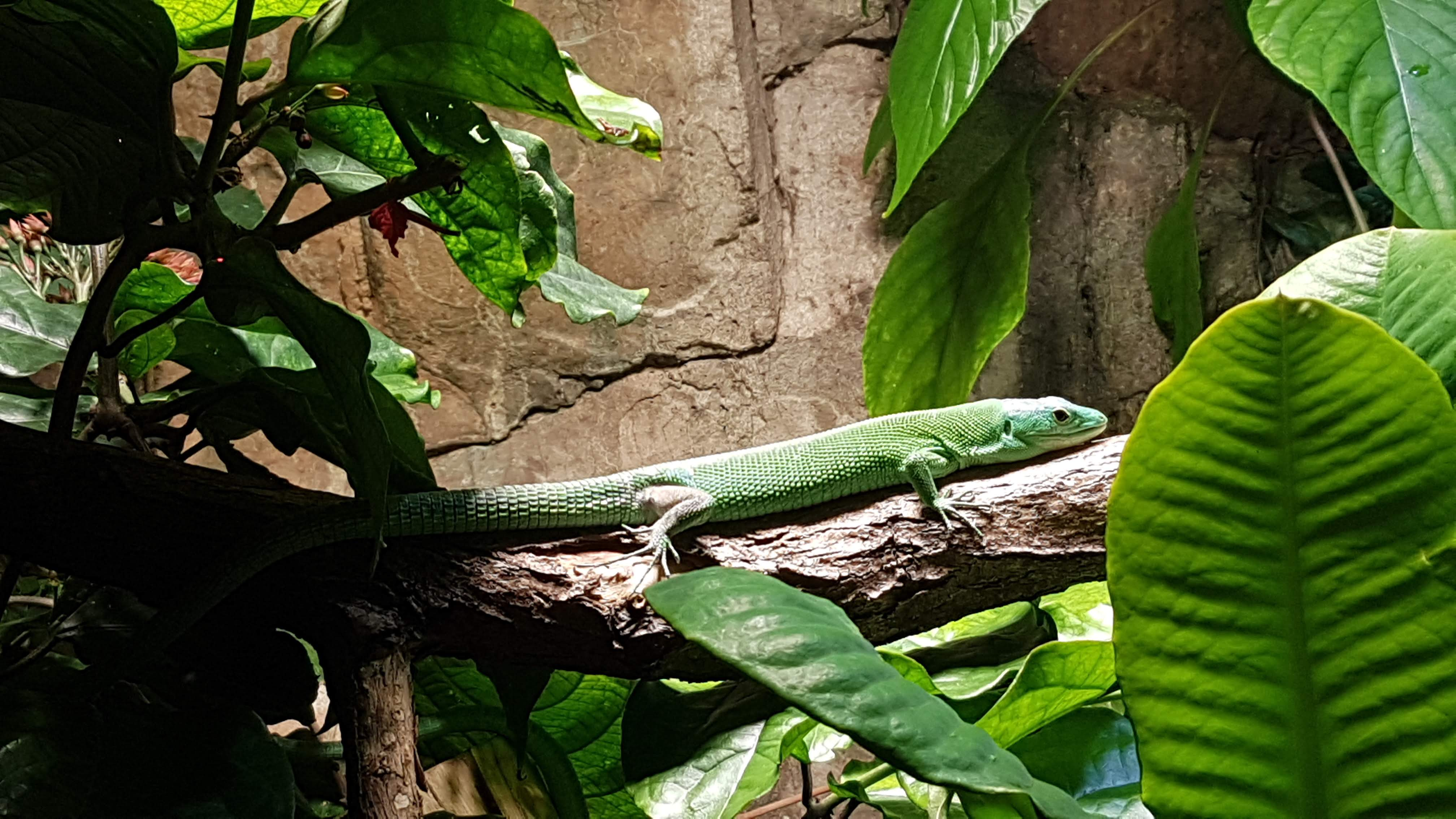
Green keel-bellied lizard at Aquarium Berlin

The green keel-bellied lizard is a slim, bright green lizard with a long prehensile tail that accounts for about 70% of its body length. The scales on its back are small, smooth and non-overlapping, and emerald-green in colour. The scales on its underside are yellow-green and keeled. There are patches of turquoise around its limbs, and occasionally black speckled lines along the sides of its body and black speckles on its tail. Its tongue is bright red.

It can grow up to a length of 40 cm (16 in), with average individuals measuring 25–35 cm (9.8–13.8 in). Juveniles are 11–12 cm (4.3–4.7 in) long. Its digits are long and spindly, with a hooked claw at the end.

== Biology and behaviour ==
This species is active during the day and arboreal. Its diet predominantly consists of insects, but it has been known to eat smaller lizards in captivity. Mating behaviour consists of the male biting the female's neck, and intertwining tails. It is oviparous. In captivity, it lays clutches of five eggs in the early autumn.
