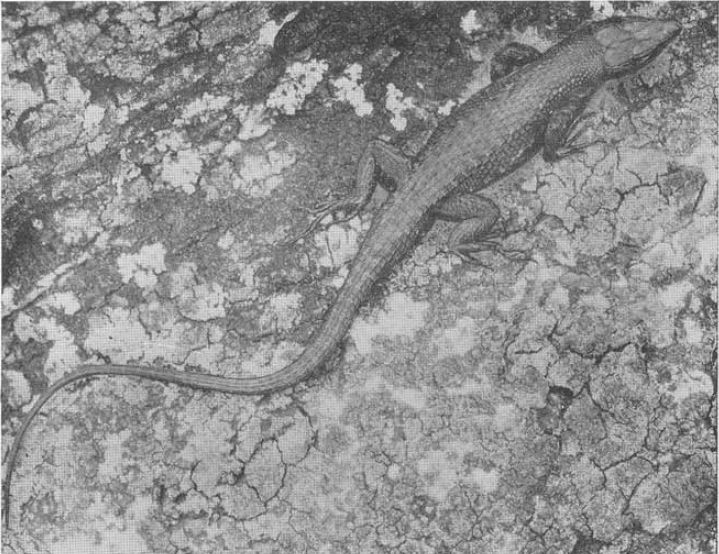

Conservation status
- Least Concern (IUCN 3.1)

Scientific classification
- Kingdom: Animalia
- Phylum: Chordata
- Class: Reptilia
- Order: Squamata
- Suborder: Lacertoidea
- Family: Lacertidae
- Genus: Adolfus
- Species: A. africanus

Binomial name
- Adolfus africanus (Boulenger, 1906)

= Adolfus africanus =

Species of lizard

Adolfus africanus, also known as the multi-scaled forest lizard or green-bellied forest lizard, is a species of lizard. It has a disjunct distribution in the Central African humid forest zone and is found in Cameroon, the Central African Republic, the Democratic Republic of the Congo, South Sudan, Uganda, Rwanda, western Kenya, and extreme northern Zambia; it seems to be absent from the central Congo Basin. It is associated with primary forests and most likely does not tolerate deforestation.
