= Congolacerta asukului =

Scientific classification
- Kingdom: Animalia
- Phylum: Chordata
- Class: Reptilia
- Order: Squamata
- Family: Lacertidae
- Genus: Congolacerta
- Species: C. asukului

Binomial name
- Congolacerta asukului Greenbaum, Villanueva, Kusamba, Aristote & Branch, 2011

Species of lizard

Congolacerta asukului also known as Asukulu's grass lizard, is a species of lizard endemic to the Democratic Republic of the Congo.

== Etymology ==
Congolacerta asukului is named in honour of Itombwe zoologist Asukulu M’Mema.
