= Adolfus mathewsensis =

Scientific classification
- Kingdom: Animalia
- Phylum: Chordata
- Class: Reptilia
- Order: Squamata
- Family: Lacertidae
- Genus: Adolfus
- Species: A. mathewsensis

Binomial name
- Adolfus mathewsensis Greenbaum, Dowell-Beer, Hughes, Wagner, Anderson, Villanueva, Malonza, Kusamba, Aristote, & Branch, 2018

Species of lizard

Adolfus mathewsensis is a species of lizard endemic to Kenya.
