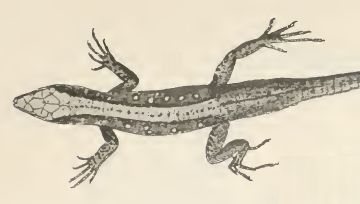
- Congolacerta vauereselli

Scientific classification
- Kingdom: Animalia
- Phylum: Chordata
- Class: Reptilia
- Order: Squamata
- Family: Lacertidae
- Genus: Congolacerta; Greenbaum, Villanueva, Kusamba, Aristote & Branch, 2011

Species
- See text.

= Congolacerta =

Genus of lizards

Congolacerta is a genus of equatorial African lacertids of the family Lacertidae. Species of this genus are distributed in western East Africa.

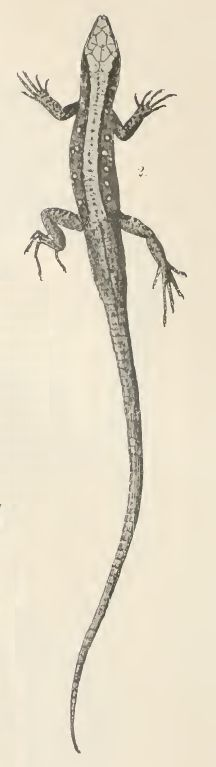
Male of Congolacerta vauereselli (from Sternfeld 1912)

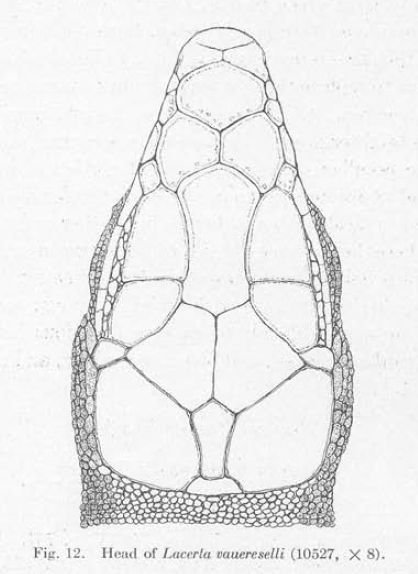
Head of Congolacerta vauereselli

== Etymology ==
The name Congolacerta is a combination of "Congo" and "lacerta" (lizard). The common name is Congo Lizard.

== Distribution ==
Congolacerta vauereselli occurs from the Lendu Plateau (west of Lake Albert in Democratic Republic of Congo) along the Albertine Rift and its foothills through southwestern Uganda, Rwanda, and northwestern Tanzania as far south as the Kabobo Plateau at the border of South Kivu and Katanga Provinces, Democratic Republic of Congo. C. asukului is known from only four localities from a small area (550 km2) at the highest elevations of the Itombwe Plateau/South Kivu/Democratic Republic of Congo.

== Habitat and natural history ==
Congolacerta are diurnal lacertid lizards which are good climbers on standing and fallen timber and rocky walls and presumably lay eggs. They emerge to bask as the morning warms up, and will then hunt for small arthropods.

Congolacerta vauereselli can be found in clearings and openings within Guineo-Congolian forests from 1000–2675 m altitude. In Parc National des Volcans/Rwanda this species lives only on the artificial volcanic rock wall (which is 1–2 m high) intended to keep buffalo (Syncerus caffer) inside the park boundary (buffalo wall). C. vauereselli is sympatric in this region with Adolfus jacksoni and were found basking within 3 m of each other on the wall. Adolfus jacksoni appeared to be more common than C. vauereselli. Spawls et al. (2002) mentions that C. vauereselli is a true forest lizard, but it was never encountered in true forest or any other closed canopy habitat.

Congolacerta asukului occurs in high-elevation grasslands (more than 2650 m altitude) often near rocky outcrops of the Itombwe Plateau in the Albertine Rift Montane Forest ecoregion. They inhabit high-elevation meadows that are common amongst rivers, swamps, and subalpine scrub forests, which are dominated by tree heathers and other Ericaceae. Individuals were observed basking on rocks, and they retreat to small burrows amongst tussocks of grass.

== Species ==
The following species are recognized as being valid.

- Congolacerta asukului Greenbaum, Villanueva, Kusamba, Aristote & Branch, 2011 - Asukulu's grass lizard
- Congolacerta vauereselli (Tornier, 1902) - sparse-scaled forest lizard
