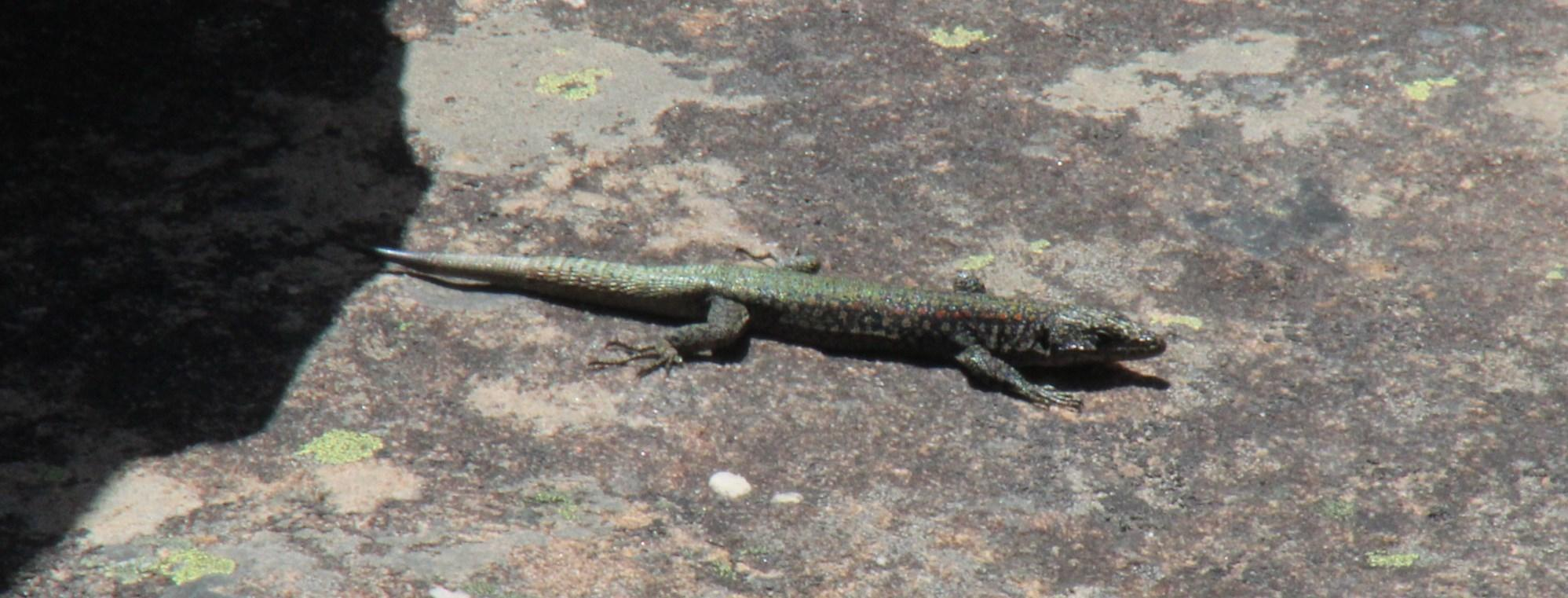

Conservation status
- Least Concern (IUCN 3.1)

Scientific classification
- Kingdom: Animalia
- Phylum: Chordata
- Class: Reptilia
- Order: Squamata
- Family: Lacertidae
- Genus: Australolacerta; Arnold, 1989
- Species: A. australis

Binomial name
- Australolacerta australis (Hewitt, 1926)

Synonyms
- Lacerta australis Hewitt, 1926

= Southern rock lizard =

Species of lizard

The southern rock lizard (Australolacerta australis) is a species of lizard in the family Lacertidae. It is endemic to the Western Cape, South Africa. It occurs in fynbos on the rocky mountain slopes.

Southern rock lizard is an oviparous species that grows to a snout–vent length of 50–65 mm (2.0–2.6 in), occasionally to 70 mm (2.8 in).
