= Poromera =

Scientific classification
- Kingdom: Animalia
- Phylum: Chordata
- Class: Reptilia
- Order: Squamata
- Family: Lacertidae
- Genus: Poromera; Boulenger, 1887
- Species: P. fordii

Binomial name
- Poromera fordii (Hallowell, 1857)

Genus of lizards

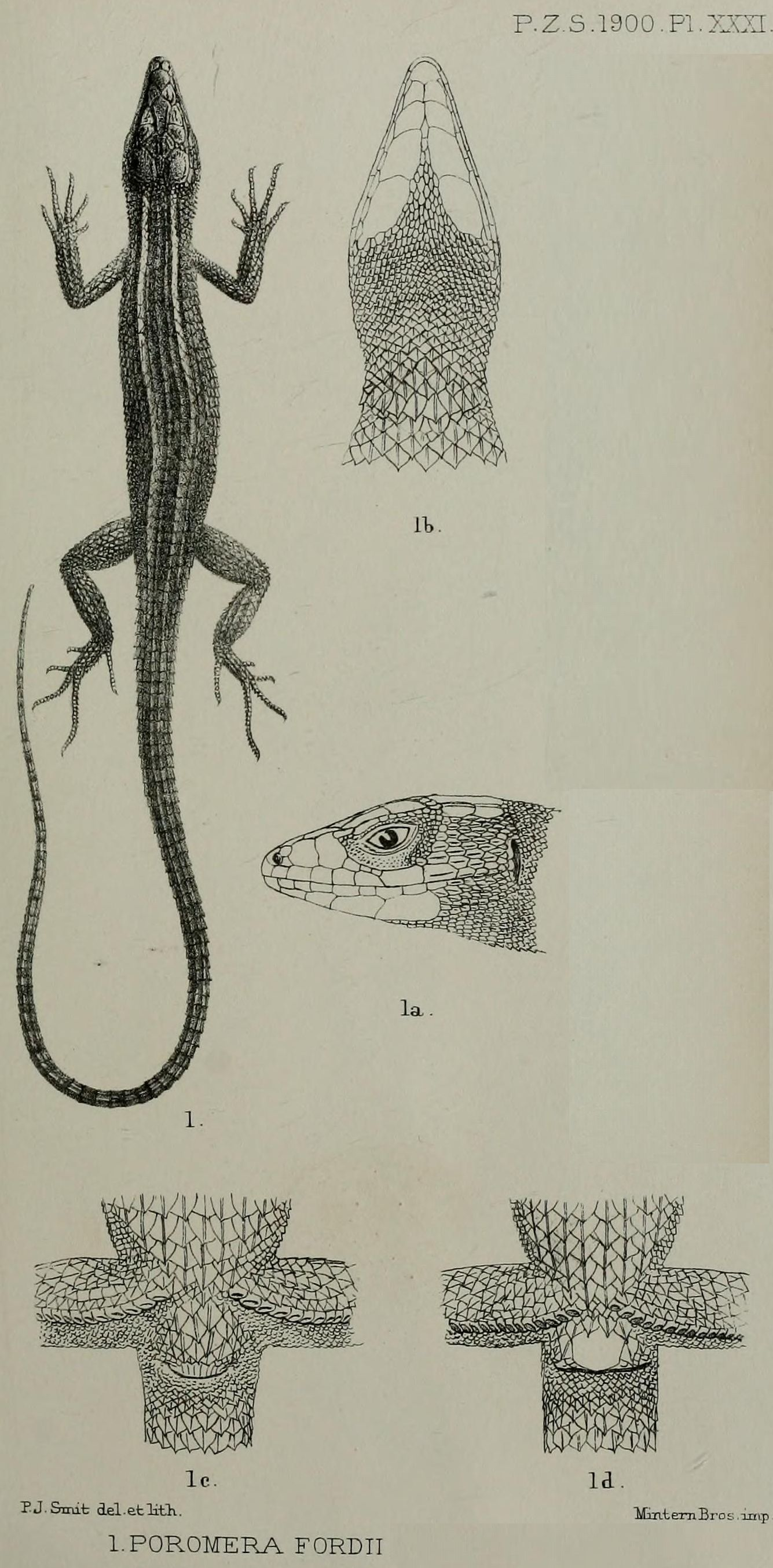
Poromera fordii

Poromera is a genus of lizard in the family Lacertidae. The genus Poromera is monotypic, containing the single species, Poromera fordii, commonly known as the West African striped lizard. The species is endemic to western Central Africa.

== Etymology ==
Poromera is derived from the Greek words "póros" (πόρος) which means "pore" or "duct" and "mērós" (μηρός) which means "thigh". Poromera refers to the long series of femoral pores on the thighs of this species.

The specific name, fordii, is in honor of Dr. Henry A. Ford, a medical missionary in Gabon, who collected specimens for the Philadelphia Academy of Natural Sciences.

== Description ==
The body of P. fordii is moderately or rather feebly depressed, the head feebly depressed. The head-shields are normal. The nostril is pierced between the nasal, two postnasals, and the first upper labial. The lower eyelid is scaly. The distinct collar contains 12-14 pointed, strongly keeled plates. The back is covered with large, platelike, subimbricate scales with strong keels forming 6 or 8 continuous lines, the sides with small juxtaposed scales. The ventral plates are pointed, imbricate, keeled and arranged in 8 (or 10) longitudinal and 22-27 transversal rows. Males have a large preanal plate which is bordered by a semicircle of pointed keeled scales, while in females the preanal region is covered with pointed keeled scales (sexual dimorphism). The digits are slightly compressed, with tubercular lamellae interiorly. The 10-15 femoral pores on each side form a long series and are more developed in males. The caudal scales are pointed and very strongly keeled. The tail is cylindrical and very long, 2 to 2.5 times as long as the head and body.

Snout-vent-length is up to 65 mm (2.6 in); total length is almost 220 millimetres (8.7 in).

The ground colour of the body is dark olive above, often turning to bronze or copper-coloured posteriorly. Two light dorsal streaks, bright greenish or bluish white, sometimes edged with black anteriorly originate from the middle of the posterior border of the parietal shield. The streaks often disappear on the posterior part of the back. The back between the light streaks is sometimes blackish, which shade is continued as a stripe to the base of the tail. On the posterior back and tail base traces of a light vertebral streak are sometimes present in the young. The upper lip is bluish green. The tail is uniform brownish or reddish brown in the young, sometimes with a dorsal series of black spots. The lower parts of body are coloured greenish white in front and salmon-pink behind.

== Geographic range and habitat ==
P. fordii is distributed in westerns parts of Cameroon, Equatorial Guinea (Fernando Po Island), Gabon and south to Democratic Republic of Congo (western Bas-Congo) from almost sea level up to 900 m (3,000 ft) altitude in Cameroon. It is a diurnal, semiarboreal forest species that can be found in flimsy, grassy and lower vegetation often near permanent streams.

== Reproduction ==
The West African striped lizard presumably lays eggs.

== Diet ==
The diet of P. fordii consists of insects and other arthropods.

== Bibliography and further reading ==
- Bischoff W (1992). "Übersicht der Arten und Unterarten der Familie Lacertidae: 6. Die Gattungen Poromera, Psammodromus, Pseuderemias, Takydromus und Tropidosaurus". Die Eidechse 3 (6): 13–17. (in German).
- Boulenger GA (1887). Catalogue of the Lizards in the British Museum (Natural History). Second Edition. Volume III., Lacertidæ ... London: Trustees of the British Museum (Natural History). (Taylor and Francis, printers). xii + 575 pp. + Plates I–XXVII. (Poromera, new genus, p. 6; Poromera fordii, new combination, pp. 6–7).
- Boulenger GA (1900). "A list of the batrachians and reptiles of the Gaboon (French Congo), with descriptions of new genera and species". Proceedings of the Zoological Society of London 1900: 433–456.
- Boulenger GA (1921). Monograph of the Lacertidae. Vol. II. London: British Museum (Natural History). Department of Zoology. 451 pp.
- Chirio L, LeBreton M (2007). Atlas des reptiles du Cameroun. Paris: MNHN (Muséum national d'Histoire naturelle), IRD (Institut de Recherche pour le Développement). 688 pp. (in French).
- Freyhof J (1994). "Poromera fordii (HALLOWELL, 1857) bei Dehane am unteren Nyong in Kamerun beobachtet ". Die Eidechse, Bonn/Bremen 5 (12): 23–25. (in German).
- Hallowell E (1857). "Notice of a collection of Reptiles from the Gaboon country, West Africa, recently presented to the Academy of Natural Sciences of Philadelphia, by Dr. Henry A. Ford". Proceedings of the Academy of Natural Sciences of Philadelphia 9: 48–72. (Tachydromus fordii, new species, pp. 48–49).
- LeBreton M (1999). A working checklist of the herpetofauna of Cameroon - With localities for species occurring in southern Cameroon and a list of herpetofauna for the Dja Faunal Reserve. Netherlands Committee for IUCN. 141 pp.
- Mertens R (1968). "Zur Kenntnis der Herpetofauna von Kamerun und Fernando Poo ". Bonner zoologische Beiträge 19 (1/2): 69–84. (in German).
- Nagy ZT, Kusamba C, Collet M, Gvoždík V (2013). "Notes on the herpetofauna of western Bas-Congo, Democratic Republic of the Congo". Herpetology Notes 6: 413–419.
- Orriols, Fèlix Amat (2011). "Preliminary analysis of correlated evolution of morphology and ecological diversification in lacertid lizards". Butlletí de la Societat Catalana d'Herpetologia, Barcelona 19: 29–48.
- Pauwels OSG, Burger M, Branch WR, Tobi E, Yoga J-A, Mikolo E-N (2004). "Reptiles du Complexe d’Aires Protégées de Gamba, sud-ouest du Gabon ". Bulletin of the Biological Society of Washington 12: 91–100. (in French).
- Pauwels OSG, Christy P, Honorez A (2006). "Reptiles and National Parks in Gabon, Western Central Africa". Hamadryad, Madras 30 (1/2): 181–196.
- Schmidt KP (1919). "Contributions to the herpetology of the Belgian Congo based on the collection of the American Congo Expedition, 1909–1915. Part I. Turtles, crocodiles, lizards, and chameleons". Bulletin of the American Museum of Natural History 39 (2): 385–624.
