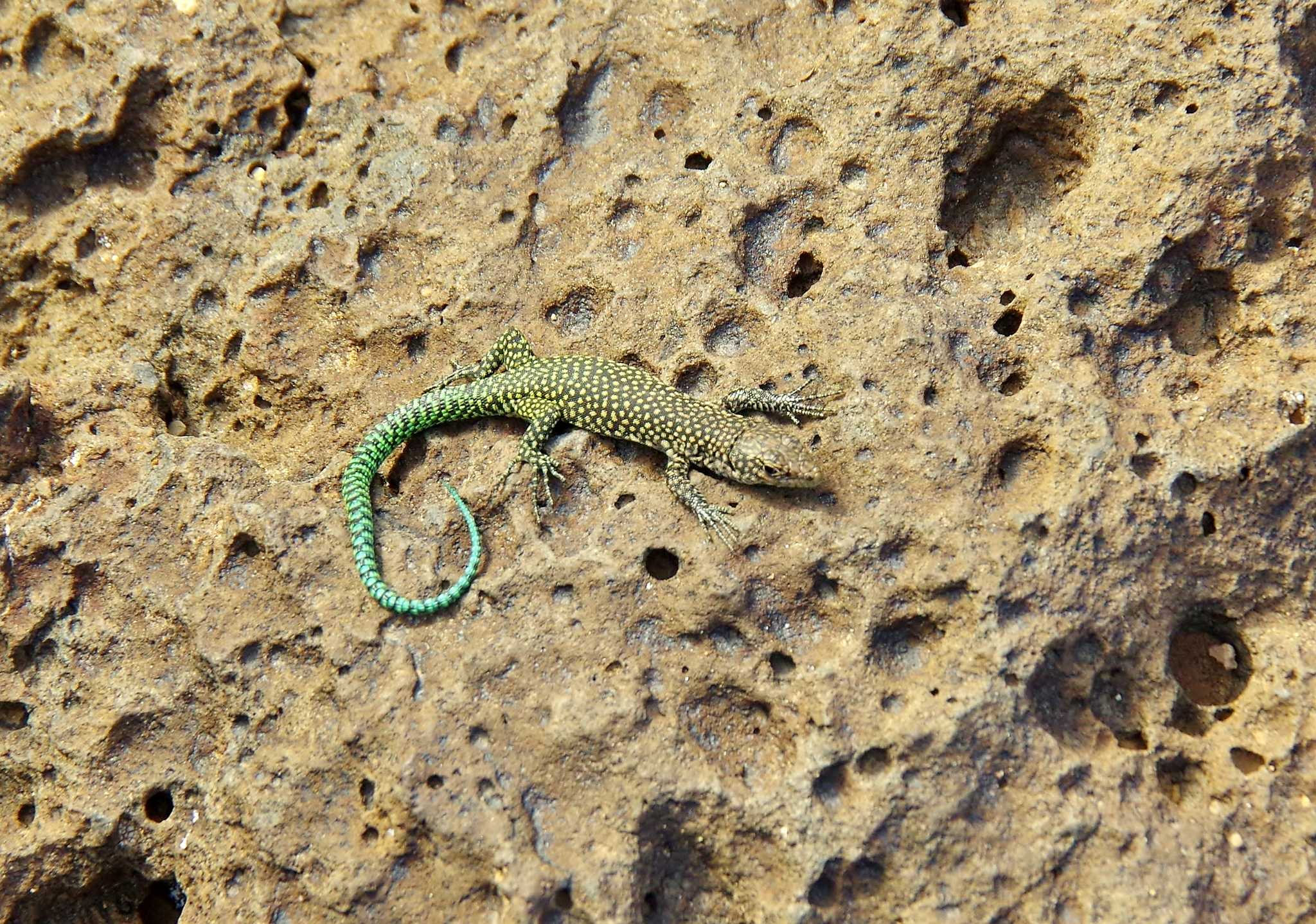

Conservation status
- Least Concern (IUCN 3.1)

Scientific classification
- Kingdom: Animalia
- Phylum: Chordata
- Class: Reptilia
- Order: Squamata
- Suborder: Lacertoidea
- Family: Lacertidae
- Genus: Scelarcis; Fitzinger, 1843
- Species: S. perspicillata

Binomial name
- Scelarcis perspicillata (Duméril & Bibron, 1839)
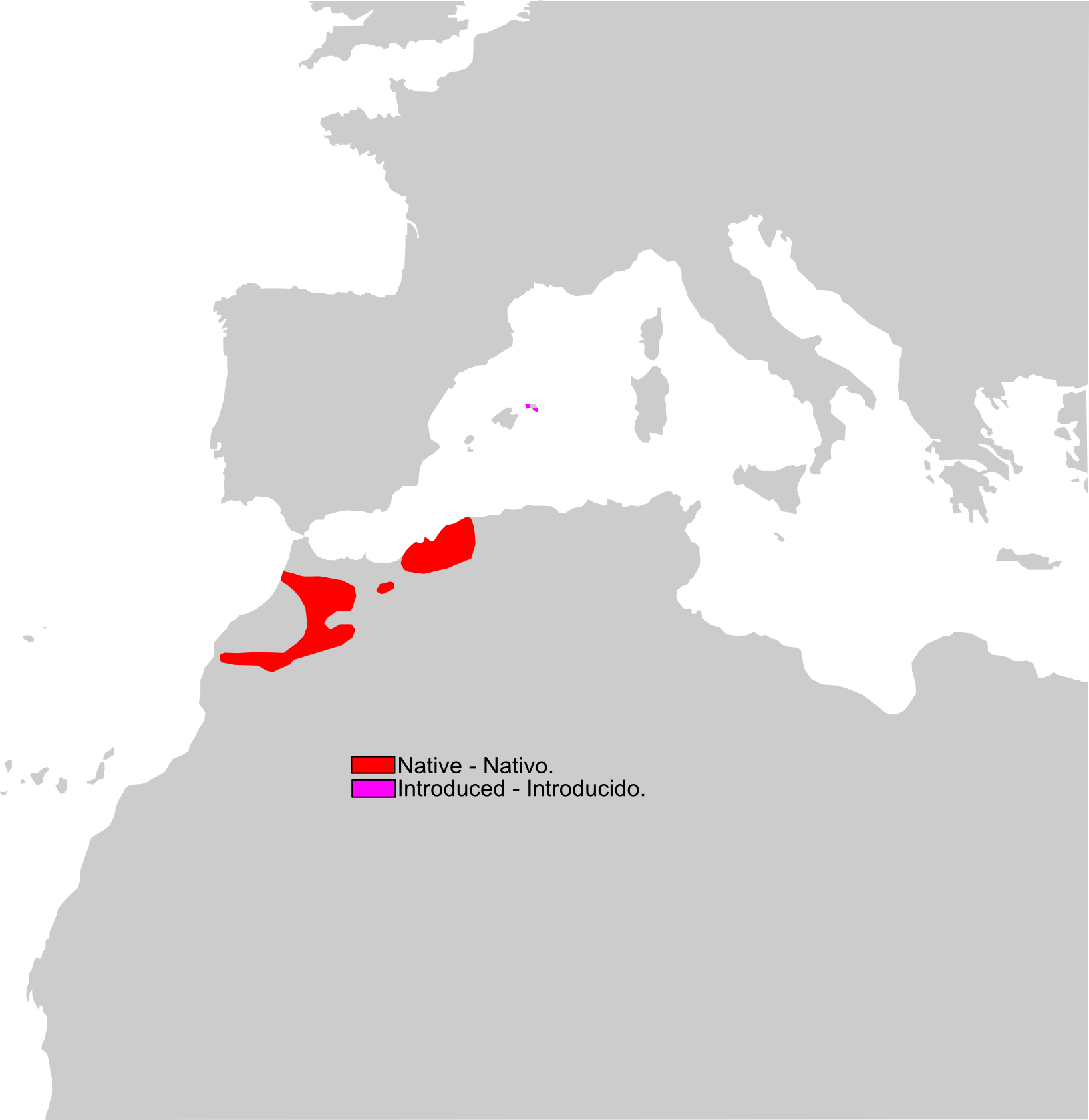

Synonyms
- Lacerta perspicillata Duméril and Bibron, 1839; Podarcis perspicillata (Duméril & Bibron, 1839); Teira perspicillata (Duméril & Bibron, 1839)

= Moroccan rock lizard =

Species of lizard

The Moroccan rock lizard (Scelarcis perspicillata) is a species of lizard in the family Lacertidae. Its classification is uncertain and it has been placed in the genera Teira, Podarcis, Lacerta or Scelarcis. It is found in Algeria and Morocco and has been introduced to the island of Menorca in Spain. Its natural habitats are Mediterranean-type shrubby vegetation, rocky areas, sea coasts and urban areas.

== Description ==
The Moroccan rock lizard is a medium-sized, rather flattened species growing to a snout-to-vent length of 6 cm (2.4 in) with a tail about 1.7 times its body-length. Various colour forms exist. In Morocco it is usually greyish-brown often with two broad, pale stripes along the back. In Minorca the colour is buff, grey or greyish-green densely covered with dark, net-like markings. In all areas, the tail is often bluish, particularly in smaller individuals. It can be distinguished from other similar lizards by the presence of a transparent "window" in its lower eyelid. The underparts are white or bluish. Occasional completely dark-coloured individuals occur.

== Distribution ==
The Moroccan rock lizard occurs in northwestern Africa, mainly in the mountain of Morocco but also down to sea level in Algeria. It was first recorded in Minorca in 1928.

== Behaviour ==
The Moroccan rock lizard is an agile species and is found climbing on rocks, walls, cliffs and boulders, on tree trunks, on the ground among scrub and around buildings. It forages on the ground as well as on rocks. Its tail is rather fragile and individuals with regenerating tails can often be found. Females lay small clutches of one to three measuring 12 to 17 millimetres (0.47 to 0.67 in) by 6 to 8 millimetres (0.24 to 0.31 in).
