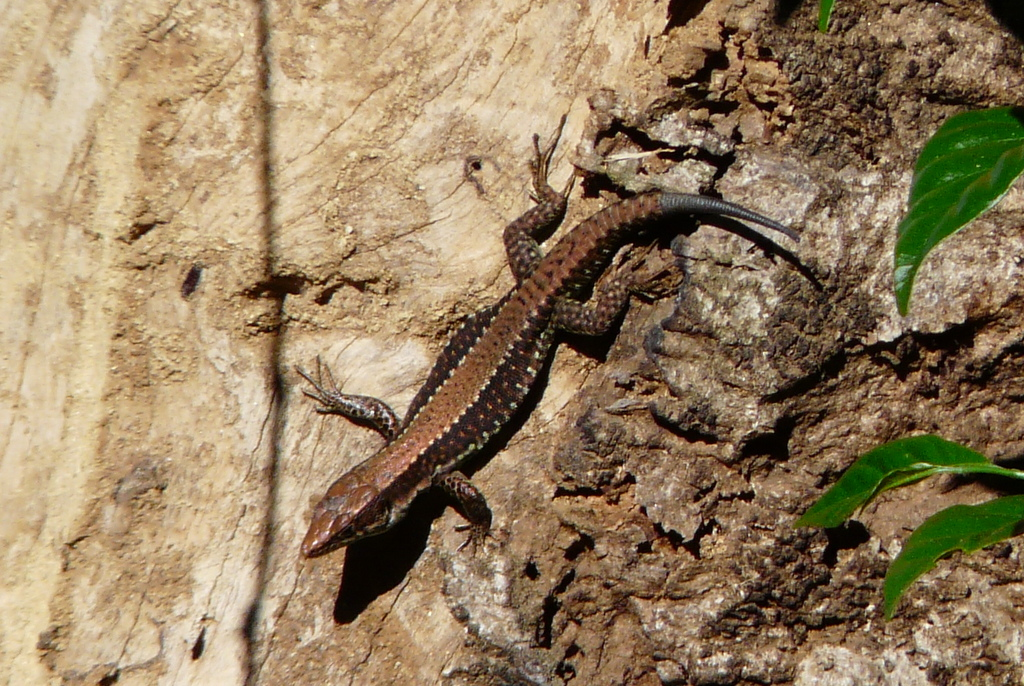

Conservation status
- Least Concern (IUCN 3.1)

Scientific classification
- Kingdom: Animalia
- Phylum: Chordata
- Class: Reptilia
- Order: Squamata
- Family: Lacertidae
- Genus: Adolfus
- Species: A. jacksoni

Binomial name
- Adolfus jacksoni (Boulenger, 1899)

Synonyms
- Lacerta jacksoni Boulenger, 1899; Lacerta (Podarcis) jacksoni — de Witte & Laurent, 1942; Adolfus jacksoni — Welch, 1982

= Adolfus jacksoni =

Species of lizard

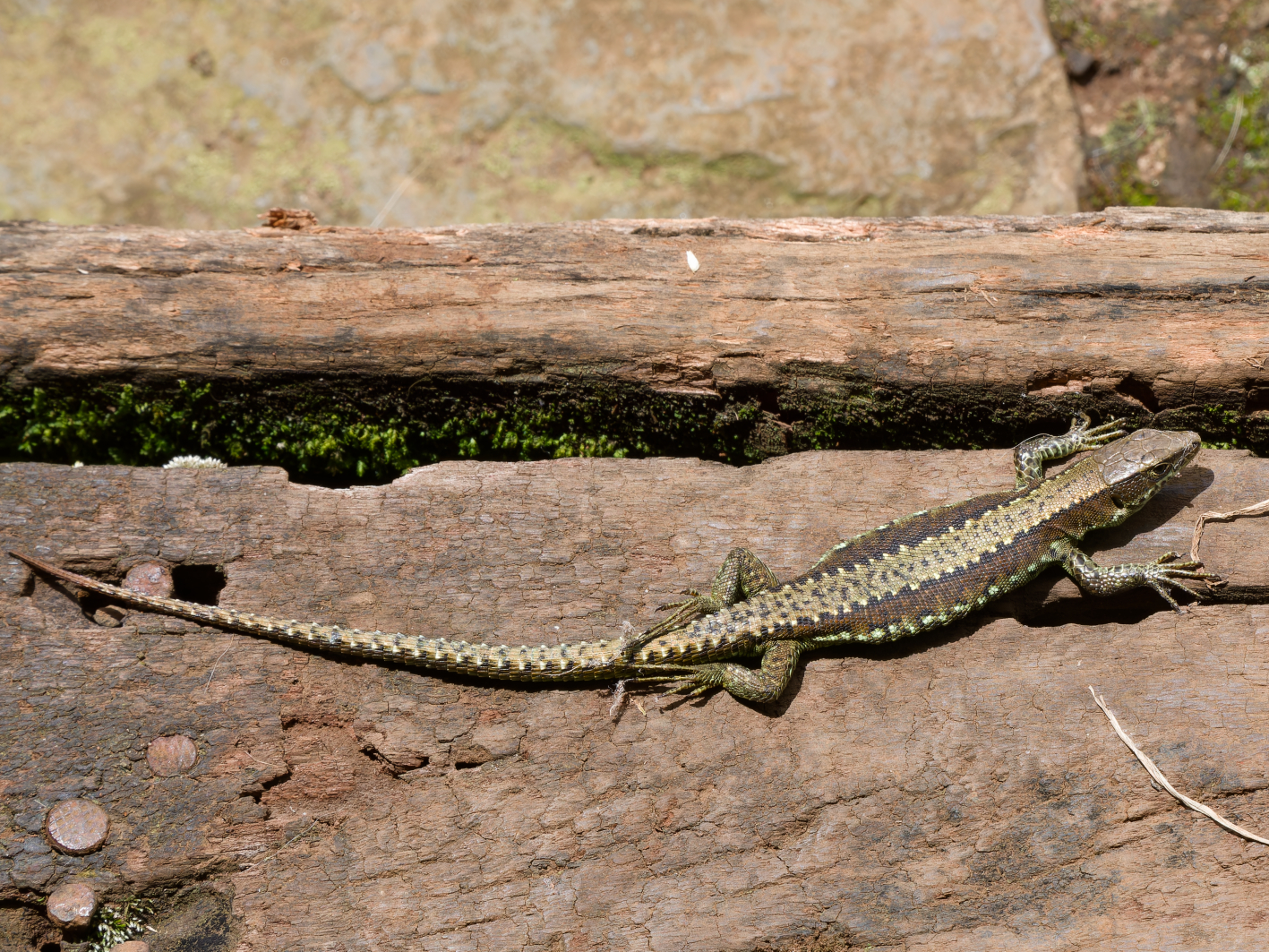
Adolfus jacksoni

Adolfus jacksoni, also known commonly as Jackson's forest lizard, is a species of lizard in the family Lacertidae. The species is native to East Africa.

== Etymology ==
A. jacksoni is named after Frederick John Jackson, who was an English colonial administrator and ornithologist.

== Geographic range ==
A. jacksoni is found in Burundi, eastern Democratic Republic of the Congo, Kenya, Rwanda, Tanzania, and Uganda.

== Habitat ==
The preferred natural habitat of A. jacksoni is forest at altitudes of 450–3,000 m (1,480–9,840 ft), but it will tolerate some human disturbance.

== Behavior ==
A. jacksoni is diurnal and semi-arboreal.

== Reproduction ==
A. jacksoni is oviparous, and clutch size is three to five eggs. Large communal nests have been found, and these nesting sites have been reused.

== As prey ==
A. jacksoni is preyed upon by the venomous viper Atheris nitschei.
