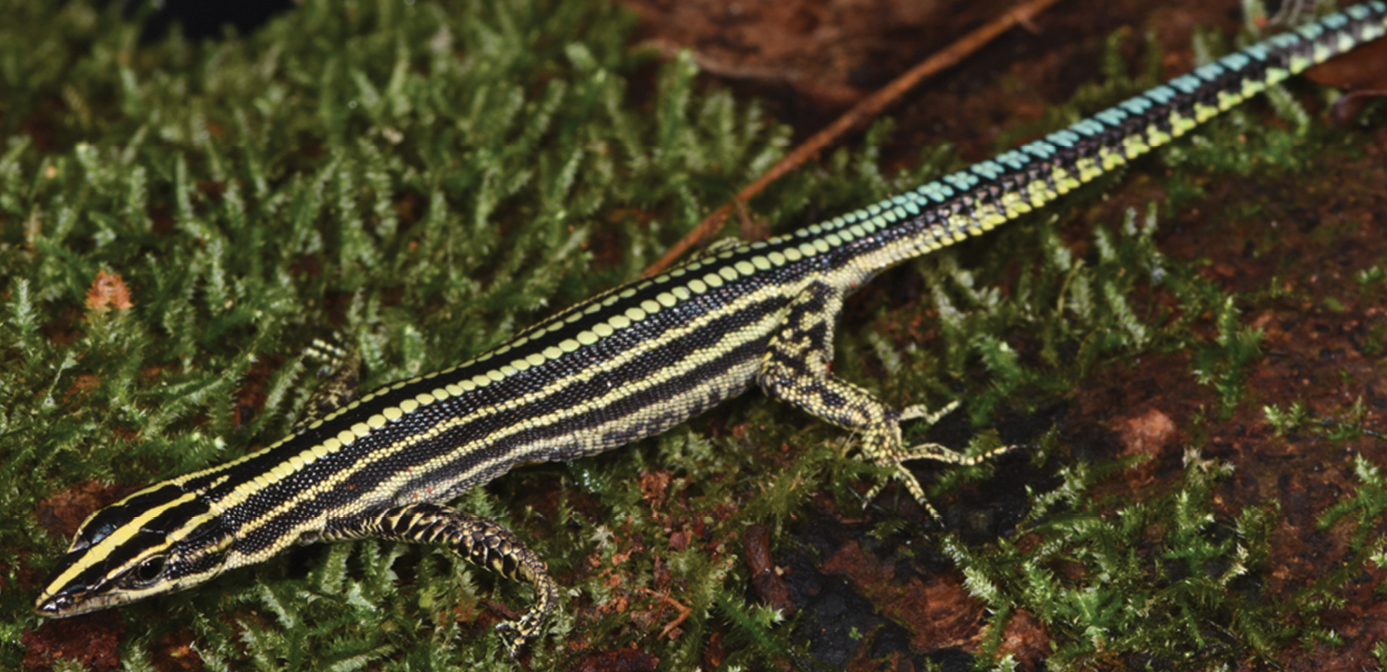

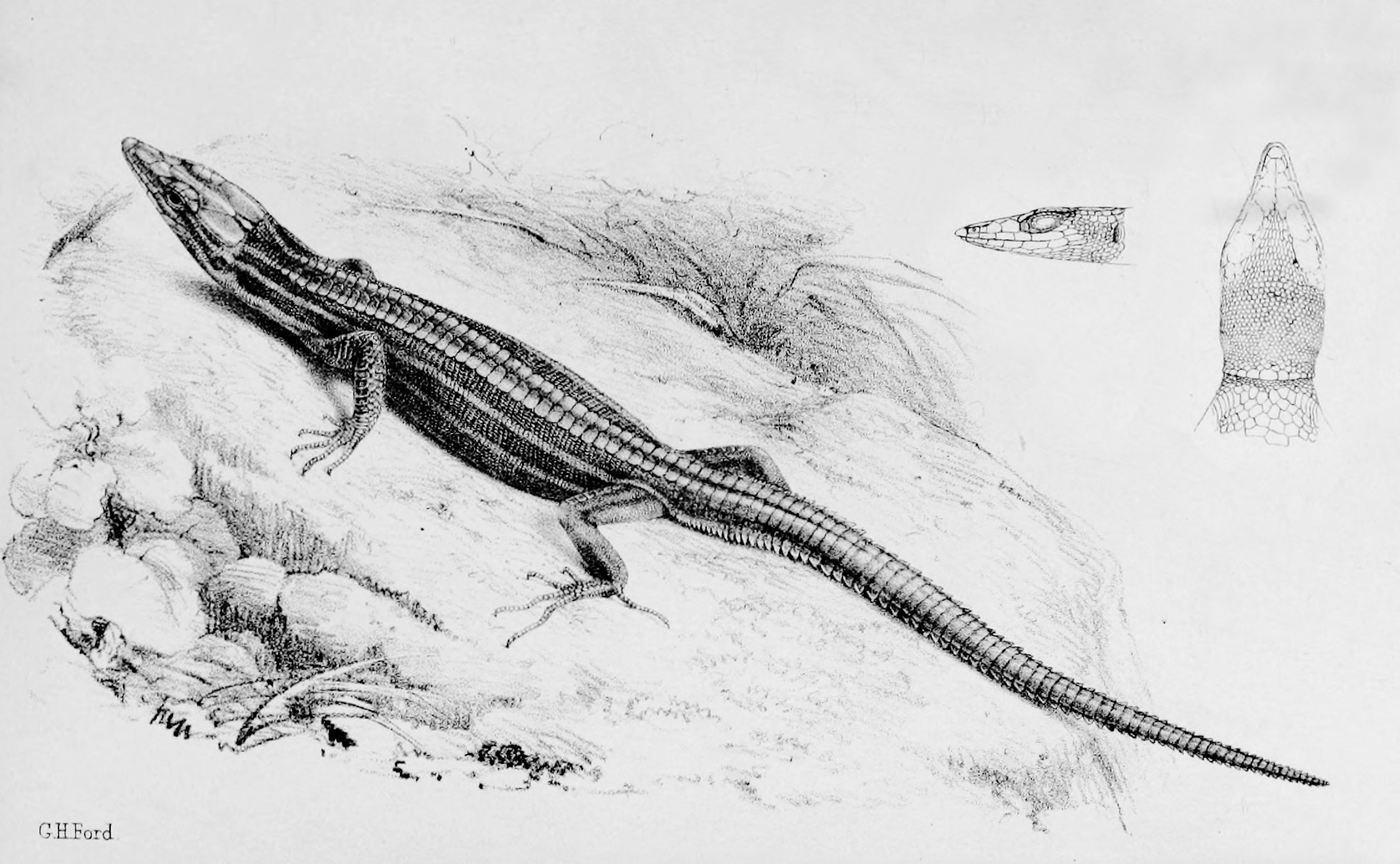

Conservation status
- Least Concern (IUCN 3.1)

Scientific classification
- Kingdom: Animalia
- Phylum: Chordata
- Class: Reptilia
- Order: Squamata
- Family: Lacertidae
- Genus: Holaspis
- Species: H. guentheri

Binomial name
- Holaspis guentheri Gray, 1863

= Holaspis guentheri =

Species of lizard

Holaspis guentheri, also commonly known as the neon blue-tailed tree lizard or the sawtail lizard, is a species of lizard in the family Lacertidae. The species is native to portions of Sub-Saharan Africa.

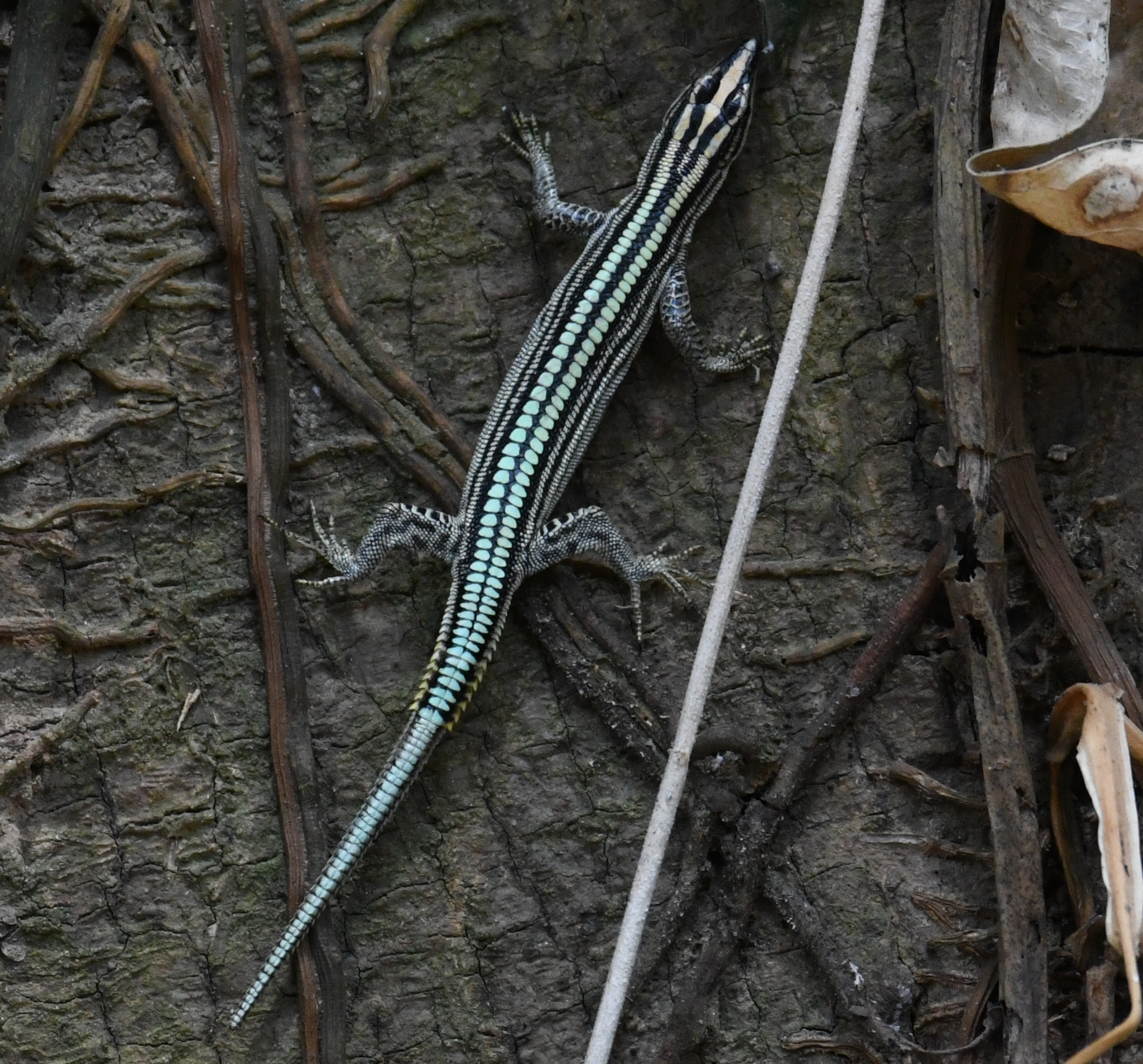
In Ghana

== Geographic range ==
H. guentheri occurs from West Africa (Sierra Leone, Liberia, Guinea, Ghana, Ivory Coast, Benin, Togo, Nigeria) to Central Africa (Cameroon, Central African Republic, Democratic Republic of the Congo, Gabon, Chad) to East Africa (Tanzania, Uganda) and Angola.

== Habitat ==
The preferred natural habitat of H. guentheri is forest, at altitudes from sea level to 800 m (2,600 ft).

== Behavior ==
H. guentheri is arboreal, and can glide between trees.

== Diet ==
H. guentheri preys upon arthropods, predominately ants.

== Reproduction ==
H. guentheri is oviparous. Clutch size is two eggs, which are laid beneath bark.

== Etymology ==
The specific name, guentheri, is in honor of German-born British herpetologist Albert Günther.
