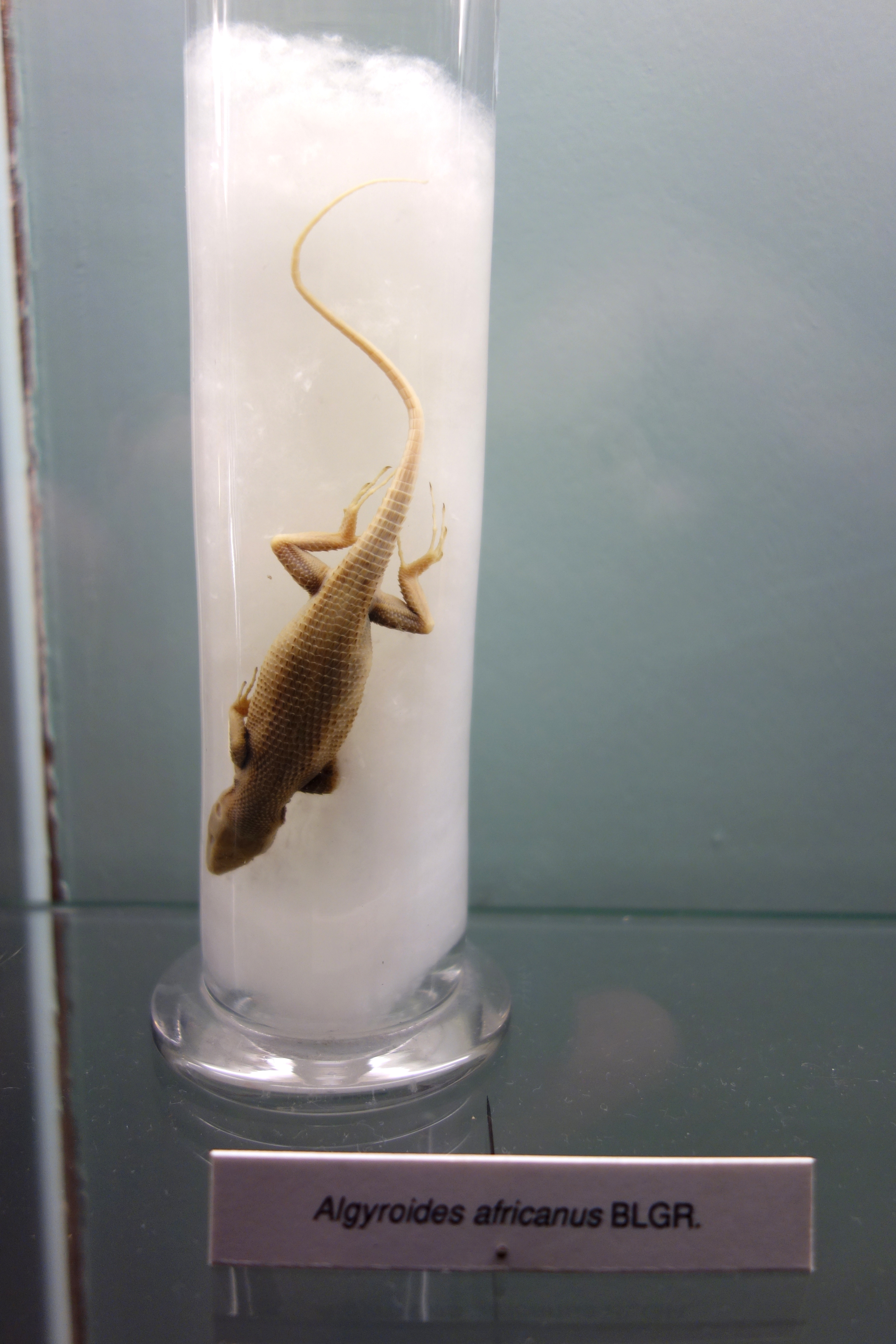
- Adolfus africanus

Scientific classification
- Kingdom: Animalia
- Phylum: Chordata
- Class: Reptilia
- Order: Squamata
- Family: Lacertidae
- Subfamily: Lacertinae
- Genus: Adolfus; Sternfeld, 1912

= Adolfus =

Genus of lizards

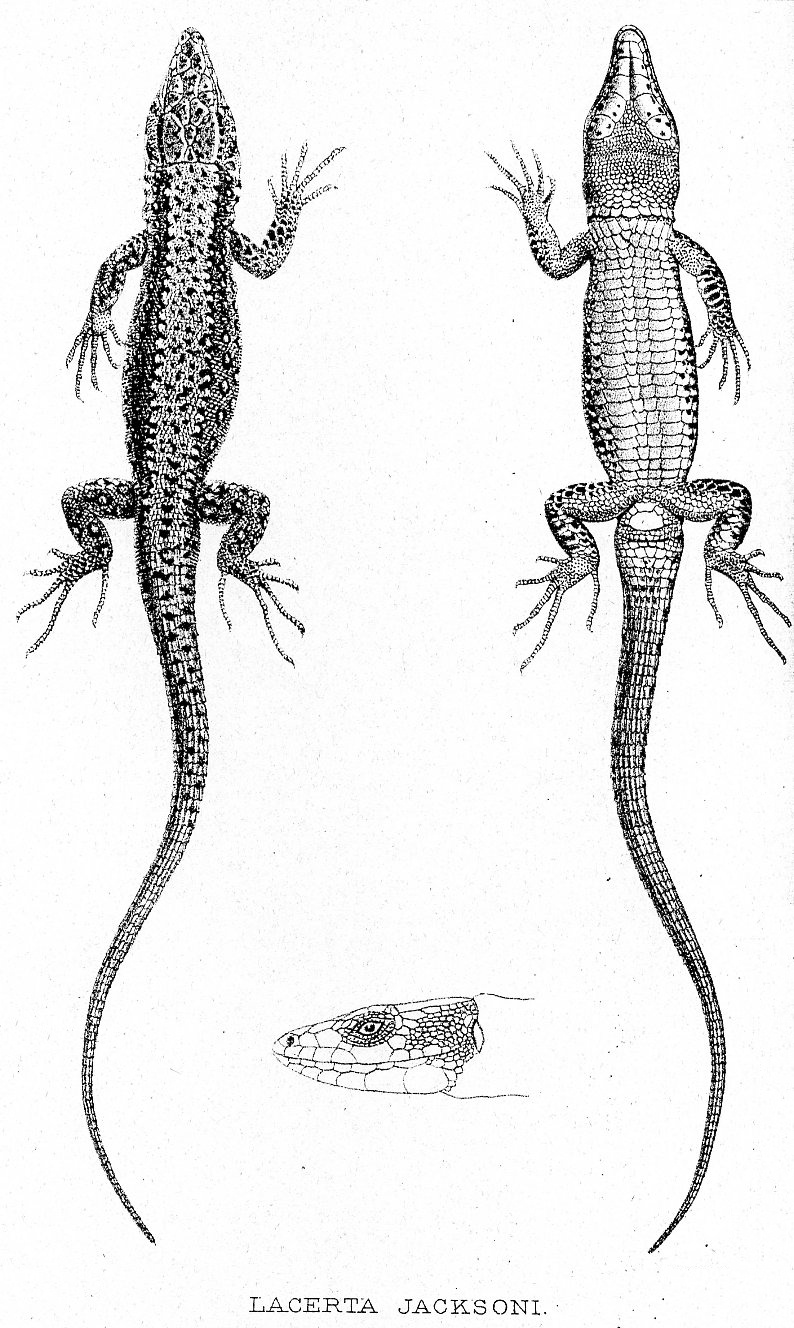
Male of Adolfus jacksoni

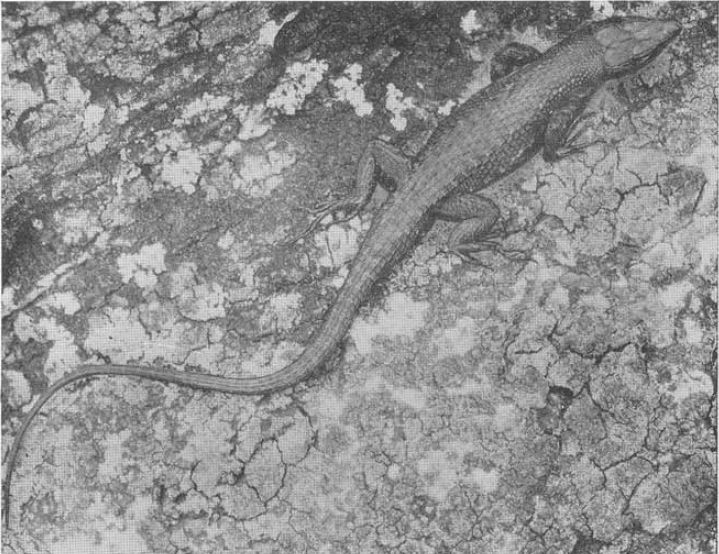
Male of Adolfus africanus

Adolfus is a genus of lizards of the family Lacertidae. The genus is endemic to subsaharan Africa.

== Etymology ==
The generic name, Adolfus, is in honor of German explorer Duke Adolf Friedrich of Mecklenburg.

== Description ==
Adolfus are typically relatively large lacertids measuring 55–84 mm (2.2–3.3 in) in snout–vent length (SVL), except for the much smaller Adolfus masavaensis measuring only 39–56 mm (1.5–2.2 in). The tail is cylindrical, without lateral fringes, and relatively long, about 1.7–2 times SVL. There is no sexual dimorphism. Based on Adolfus jacksoni, the clutch size is 3–5 eggs.

== Habitat ==
Adolfus inhabit forest, forest clearings, and grasslands. A. jacksoni inhabits also urban environments. Adolfus alleni has been recorded as high as 4,500 m (14,800 ft) above sea level.

== Species ==
The following species are recognized as being valid:

- Adolfus africanus (Boulenger, 1906)
- Adolfus alleni (Barbour, 1914)
- Adolfus jacksoni (Boulenger, 1899)
- Adolfus kibonotensis (Lönnberg, 1907)
- Adolfus masavaensis Wagner, Greenbaum & Branch, 2014
- Adolfus mathewsensis Greenbaum, Dowell-Beer, Hughes, Wagner, Anderson, Villanueva, Malonza, Kusamba, Muninga, Aristote & Branch, 2018

Nota bene: A binomial authority in parentheses indicates that the species was originally described in a genus other than Adolfus.
