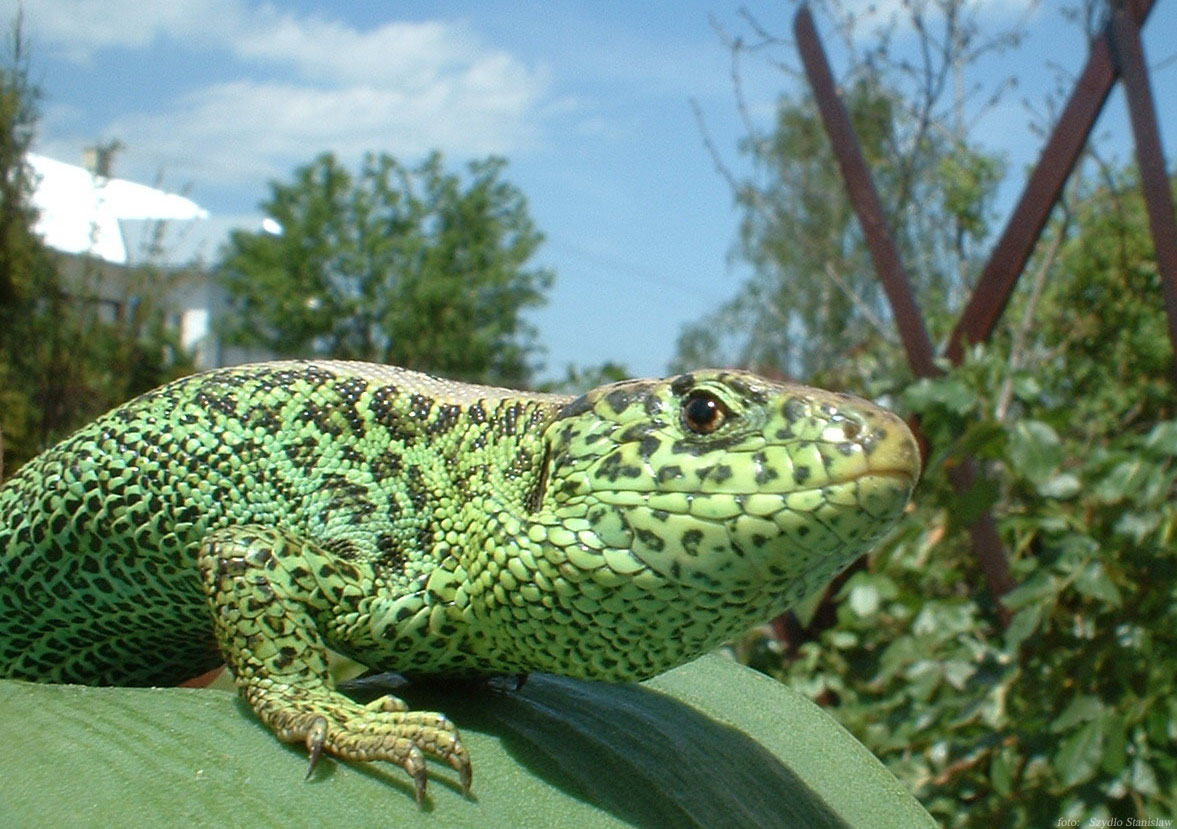
- Sand lizard (Lacerta agilis)

Scientific classification
- Kingdom: Animalia
- Phylum: Chordata
- Class: Reptilia
- Order: Squamata
- Clade: Lacertoidea
- Clade: Lacertibaenia
- Family: Lacertidae; Oppel, 1811

Type species
- Lacerta agilis Linnaeus, 1758

Subgroups
- See text
- Lacertidae distribution

= Lacertidae =

Lacertids Temporal range: Ypresian–Recent

Family of lizards

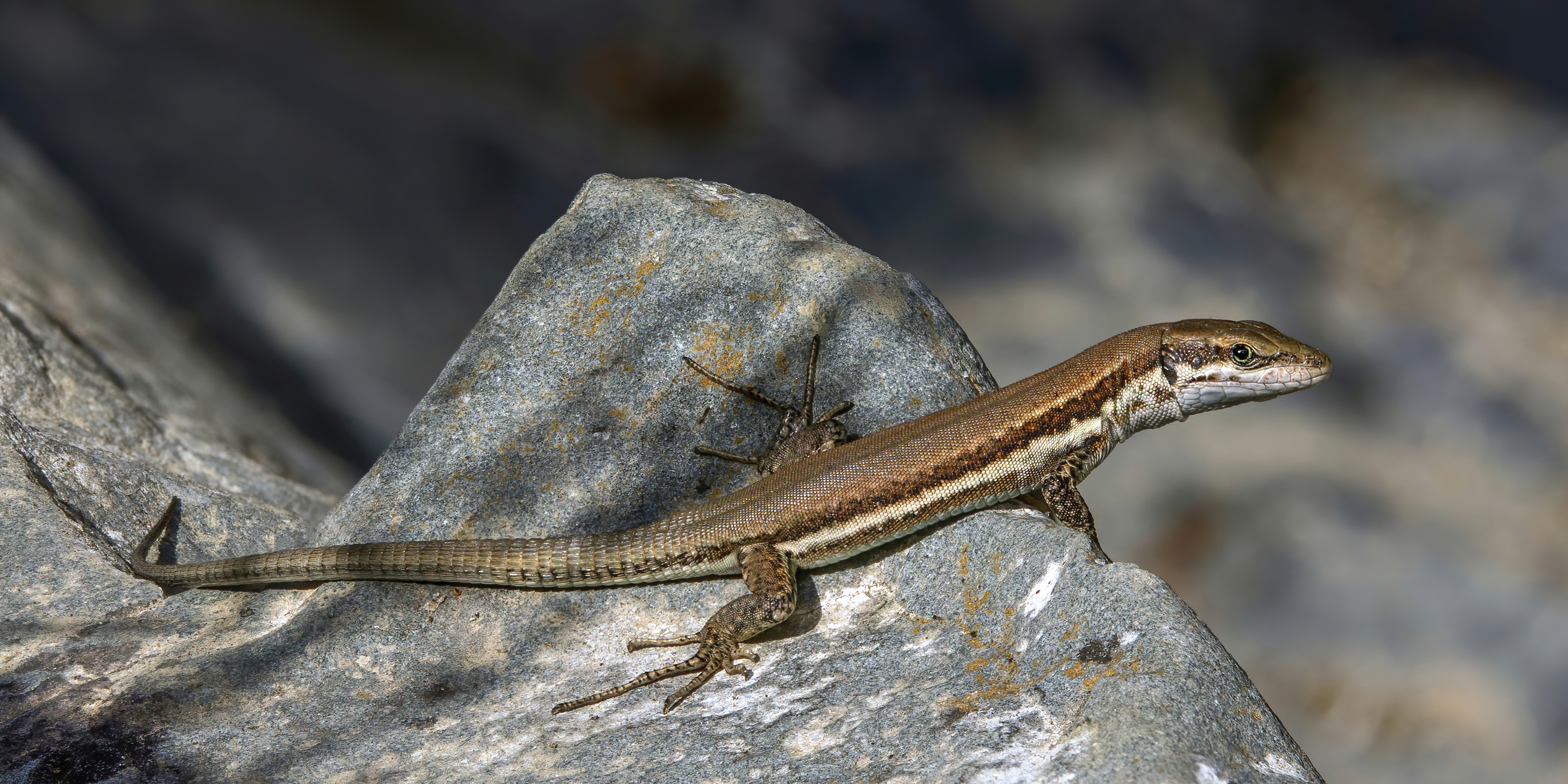
Troodos lizard Phoenicolacerta troodica

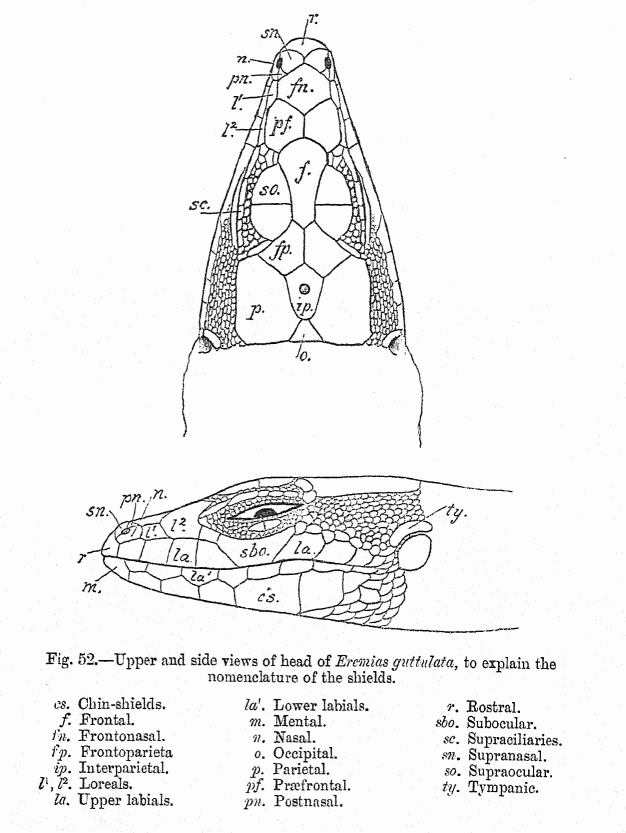
Terminology and scalation of lacertids

The Lacertidae are the family of the wall lizards, true lizards, or sometimes simply lacertas, which are native to Afro-Eurasia. It is a diverse family with at about 360 species in 39 genera. They represent the dominant group of reptiles found in Europe.

== Habitat ==
The European and Mediterranean species of lacertids live mainly in forest and scrub habitats. Eremias and Ophisops species replace these in the grassland and desert habitats of Asia. African species usually live in rocky, arid areas. Holaspis species are among the few arboreal lacertids, and its two species, Holaspis guentheri and Holaspis laevis, are gliders (although apparently poor ones), using their broad tail and flattened body as an aerofoil.

== Description ==
Lacertids are small to medium-sized lizards. Most species are less than 9cm long, excluding the tail. The largest living species, Gallotia stehlini, reaches 46cm, and some extinct forms were larger still. They are primarily insectivorous. An exception is Meroles anchietae. Although some M. anchietae individuals eat primarily arthropods and plant matter, other individuals specialize in eating seeds in the Namib Desert.

Lacertids are remarkably similar in form, with slender bodies and long tails, but have highly varied patterns and colours, even within the same species. Their scales are large on the head, which often also has osteoderms, small and granular on the back, and rectangular on the underside. Most species are sexually dimorphic, with the males and females having different patterns.

At least eight species from the Caucasus are parthenogenetic, and three species give birth to live young, including the viviparous lizard, Zootoca vivipara.

== Evolutionary history ==
Lacertids are suspected to have originated in Europe, due to their earliest fossils being found in the region, alongside those of their sister group, the extinct Eolacertidae. Fossils possibly attributable to lacertids are known from the Paleocene of France and Belgium. The oldest definitive lacertid is known from the early Eocene (Ypresian) in Mutigny, France in the Paris Basin. Lacertids dispersed into Asia by the early Oligocene. The timing of the colonisation of Africa is uncertain, ranging from the Eocene to the Miocene.

== Classification ==
The classification into subfamilies and tribes below follows one presented by Arnold et al., 2007, based on their phylogenetic analysis.

Family Lacertidae

- Subfamily Gallotiinae
  - Genus Gallotia (8 species)
  - Genus Psammodromus (8 species)
- Subfamily Lacertinae
  - Tribe Eremiadini
    - Genus Acanthodactylus (45 species)
    - Genus Adolfus (6 species)
    - Genus Australolacerta (1 species)
    - Genus Congolacerta (2 species)
    - Genus Eremias (42 species)
    - Genus Gastropholis (4 species)
    - Genus Heliobolus (6 species)
    - Genus Holaspis (2 species)
    - Genus Ichnotropis (6 species)
    - Genus Latastia (10 species)
    - Genus Meroles (8 species)
    - Genus Mesalina (20 species)
    - Genus Nucras (13 species)
    - Genus Ophisops (11 species)
    - Genus Pedioplanis (16 species)
    - Genus Philochortus (7 species)
    - Genus Poromera (1 species)
    - Genus Pseuderemias (7 species)
    - Genus Tropidosaura (4 species)
  - Tribe Lacertini
    - Genus Algyroides (4 species)
    - Genus Anatololacerta (4 species)
    - Genus Apathya (2 species)
    - Genus Archaeolacerta (1 species)
    - Genus Atlantolacerta (1 species)
    - Genus Dalmatolacerta (1 species)
    - Genus Darevskia (35 species)
    - Genus Dinarolacerta (2 species)
    - Genus Hellenolacerta (1 species)
    - Genus Iberolacerta (8 species)
    - Genus Iranolacerta (2 species)
    - Genus Lacerta (10 species)
    - Genus Omanosaura (2 species)
    - Genus Parvilacerta (2 species)
    - Genus Phoenicolacerta (4 species)
    - Genus Podarcis (26 species)
    - Genus Scelarcis (1 species)
    - Genus Takydromus (24 species)
    - Genus Teira (1 species)
    - Genus Timon (6 species)
    - Genus Vhembelacerta (1 species)
    - Genus Zootoca (2 species)

The latest extensive phylogenetic lacertid tree was made by Baeckens et al. in 2015.

=== Extinct genera ===
- †Succinilacerta Baltic amber, Eocene
- †Plesiolacerta Europe, Eocene-Oligocene
- †Dracaenosaurus France, Oligocene
- †Maioricalacerta Mallorca, Pliocene
- †Quercycerta France, Eocene
- †Janosikia Germany, Miocene
- †Escampcerta France, Eocene
- †Mediolacerta France, Germany, Oligocene
- †Pseudeumeces France, Germany, Spain, Oligocene-Miocene
- †Amblyolacerta France, Czech Republic, Miocene
- †Ligerosaurus France, Miocene
- †Miolacerta Germany, Austria, Czech Republic, Oligocene-Miocene
- †Edlartetia Augé and Rage 2000 Germany, France Austria, Miocene
- †Escampcerta France, Eocene
- †Cernaycerta? France, Paleocene (questioned by some authors)
- †Dormaalisaurus France, Belgium, Spain, Eocene
