= Graceful brown snake =

There are two genera of snake named graceful brown snake:

- Rhadinaea
- Rhadinella
