= Rhadinaea macdougalli =

Conservation status
- Data Deficient (IUCN 3.1)

Scientific classification
- Kingdom: Animalia
- Phylum: Chordata
- Class: Reptilia
- Order: Squamata
- Suborder: Serpentes
- Family: Colubridae
- Genus: Rhadinaea
- Species: R. macdougalli

Binomial name
- Rhadinaea macdougalli H.M. Smith & Langebartel, 1949

Species of snake

Rhadinaea macdougalli, also known commonly as MacDougall's graceful brown snake and la hojarasquera de MacDougall in Mexican Spanish, is a species of snake in the subfamily Dipsadinae of the family Colubridae. The species is native to southeastern Mexico.

== Etymology ==
The specific name, macdougalli, is in honor of naturalist Thomas Baillie MacDougall.

== Description ==
Rhadinaea macdougalli is a small brown snake, with some faint light lines. The dorsal scales are arranged in 17 rows at midbody. The ventrals number about 119. The subcaudals number about 75 in males, fewer in females.

== Geographic range ==
Rhadinaea macdougalli is found in the Mexican states of Oaxaca and Veracruz.

== Habitat ==
The preferred natural habitat of Rhadinaea macdougalli is forest.

== Reproduction ==
Rhadinaea macdougalli is oviparous.

== Taxonomy ==
Rhadinaea macdougalli is a member of the Rhadinaea decorata species group.
