= Rhadinella hannsteini =

Conservation status
- Data Deficient (IUCN 3.1)

Scientific classification
- Kingdom: Animalia
- Phylum: Chordata
- Class: Reptilia
- Order: Squamata
- Suborder: Serpentes
- Family: Colubridae
- Genus: Rhadinella
- Species: R. hannsteini

Binomial name
- Rhadinella hannsteini (L.C. Stuart, 1949)

Synonyms
- Trimetopon hannsteini Stuart, 1949; Rhadinaea hannsteini (Stuart, 1949)

Species of snake

Rhadinella hannsteini, also known commonly as Hannstein's spot-lipped snake and la culebra café labios manchados in Spanish, is a species of snake in the subfamily Dipsadinae of the family Colubridae. The species is native to Central America.

== Etymology ==
The specific name, hannsteini, is in honor of coffee grower Walter Bernhard Hannstein (born 1902) on whose plantation the holotype was collected.

== Geographic range ==
R. hannsteini is found in southwestern Guatemala and in the adjacent Mexican state of Chiapas.

== Habitat ==
The preferred natural habitat of R. hannsteini is forest, and it is also found in coffee plantations.

== Description ==
R. hannsteini is a small snake. The holotype has a snout-to-vent length (SVL) of 23.2 cm (9.1 in), plus a tail length of 9.2 cm (3.6 in). It has the following scalation: 2 prefrontal scales, 17 dorsal scale rows, 8 upper labials, 1 postocular.

== Reproduction ==
R. hannsteini is oviparous.

== Taxonomy ==
The species Rhadinella hannsteini was originally described as Trimetopon hannsteini, a species new to science, by American herpetologist Laurence Cooper Stuart in 1949. In 1974 American herpetologist Charles William Myers assigned the species to the genus Rhadinaea as Rhadinea hannsteini. In 2011 Myers reassigned the species to the genus Rhadinella as Rhadinella hannsteini.
