= Rhadinaea myersi =

Conservation status
- Data Deficient (IUCN 3.1)

Scientific classification
- Kingdom: Animalia
- Phylum: Chordata
- Class: Reptilia
- Order: Squamata
- Suborder: Serpentes
- Family: Colubridae
- Genus: Rhadinaea
- Species: R. myersi

Binomial name
- Rhadinaea myersi Rossman, 1965

Species of snake

Rhadinaea myersi, also known commonly as Myers' graceful brown snake and la hojarasquera de Myers in Mexican Spanish, is a species of snake in the subfamily Dipsadinae of the family Colubridae. The species is native to southern Mexico.

== Etymology ==
The specific name, myersi, is in honor of American herpetologist Charles William Myers.

== Geographic distribution ==
Rhadinaea myersi is endemic to the Mexican state of Oaxaca, where it is found in the Sierra Madre del Sur.

== Habitat ==
The preferred natural habitat of Rhadinaea myersi is forest, at elevations of approximately 1,524 m (5,000 ft).

== Reproduction ==
Rhadinaea myersi is oviparous.

== Taxonomy ==
Rhadinaea myersi is a member of the Rhadinaea decorata species group.
