= Rhadinella tolpanorum =

Conservation status
- Critically Endangered (IUCN 3.1)

Scientific classification
- Kingdom: Animalia
- Phylum: Chordata
- Class: Reptilia
- Order: Squamata
- Suborder: Serpentes
- Family: Colubridae
- Genus: Rhadinella
- Species: R. tolpanorum

Binomial name
- Rhadinella tolpanorum (Holm & Cruz, 1994)

Species of snake

Rhadinella tolpanorum is a species of snake in the family Colubridae. It is found in Honduras.
