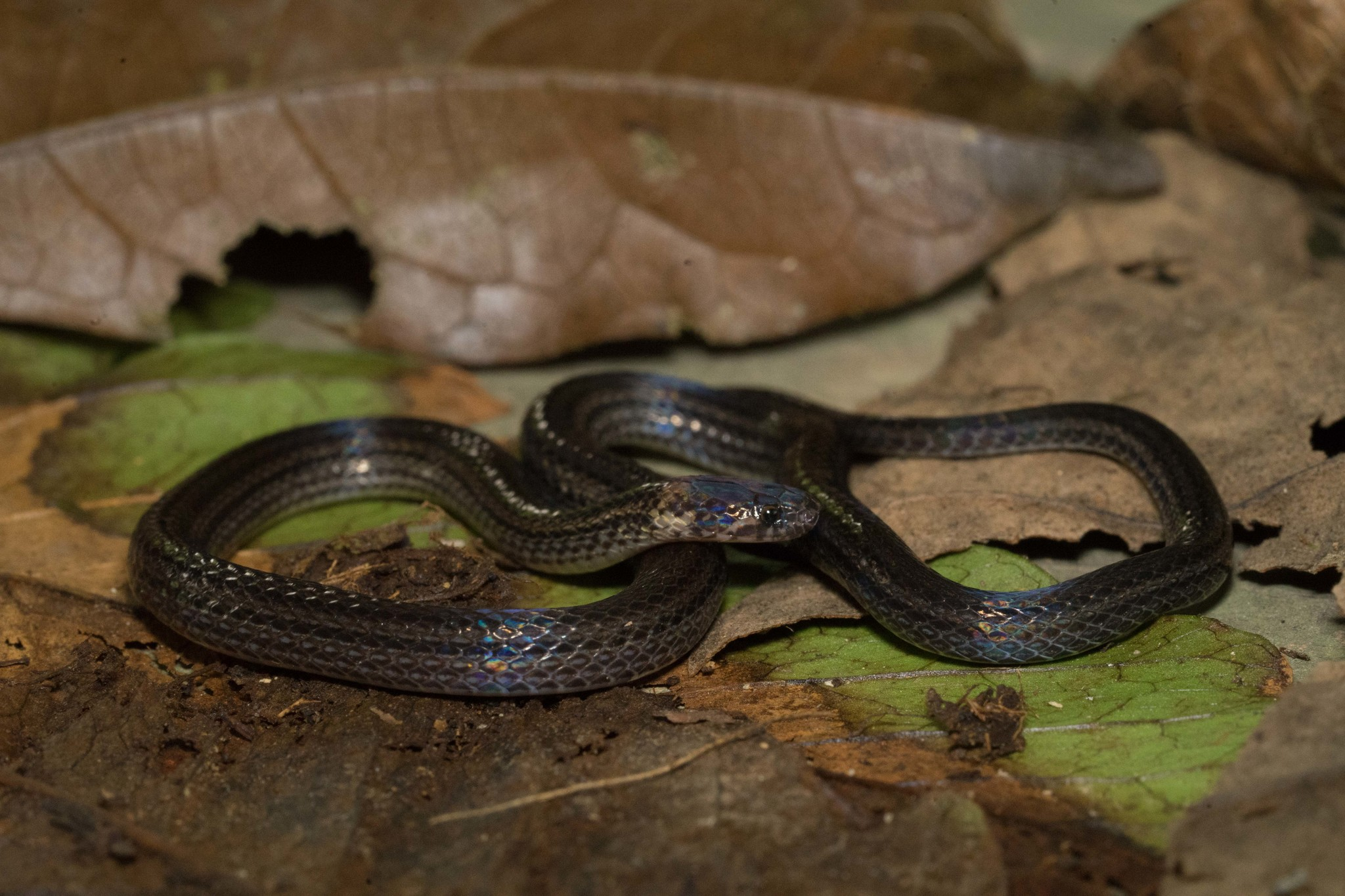

Conservation status
- Least Concern (IUCN 3.1)

Scientific classification
- Kingdom: Animalia
- Phylum: Chordata
- Class: Reptilia
- Order: Squamata
- Suborder: Serpentes
- Family: Colubridae
- Genus: Rhadinella
- Species: R. anachoreta

Binomial name
- Rhadinella anachoreta (E.N. Smith & Campbell, 1994)

= Rhadinella anachoreta =

Species of snake

Rhadinella anachoreta is a species of snake in the family Colubridae. It is found in Guatemala and Honduras.
