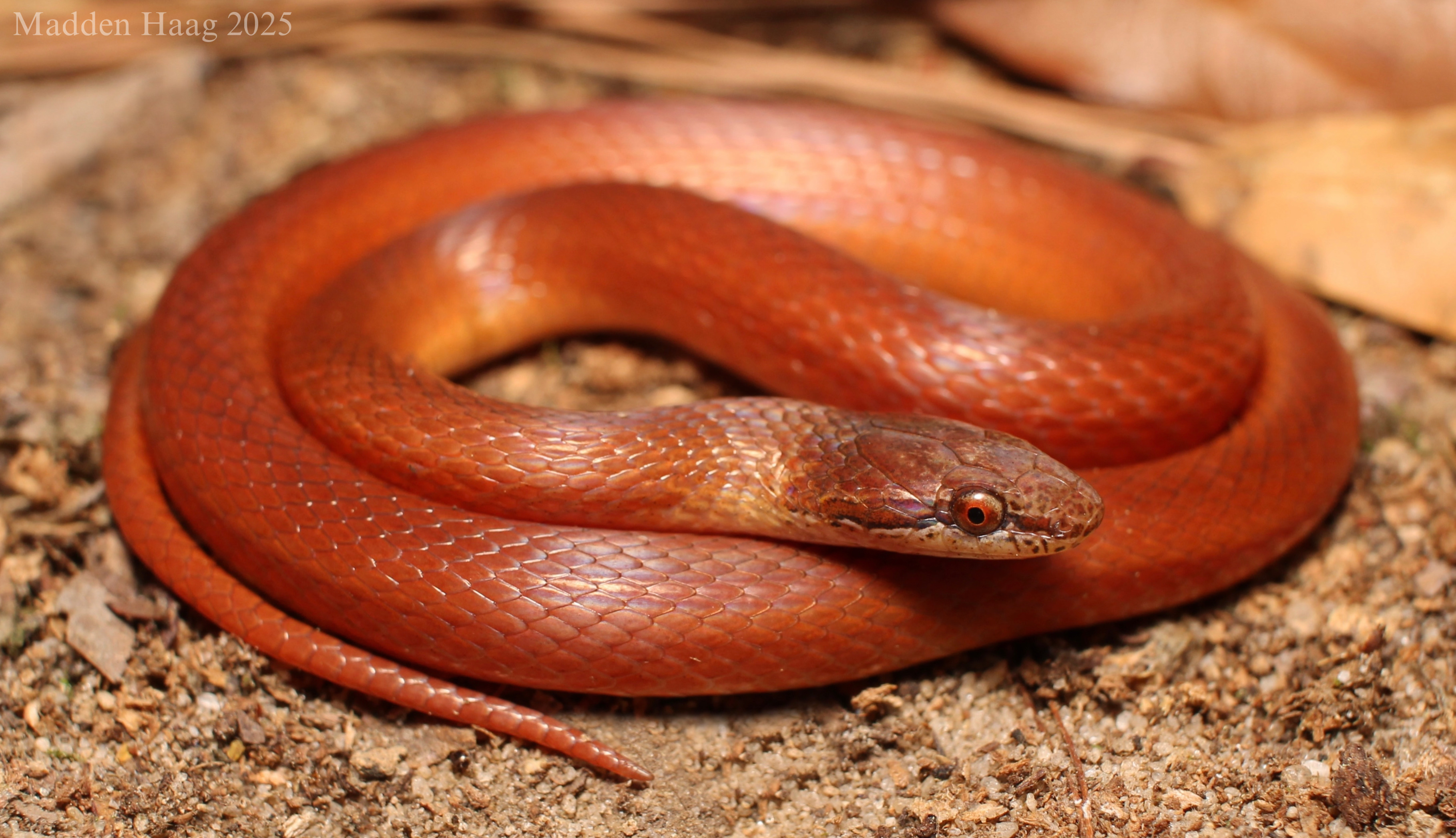

Conservation status
- Least Concern (IUCN 3.1)

Scientific classification
- Kingdom: Animalia
- Phylum: Chordata
- Class: Reptilia
- Order: Squamata
- Suborder: Serpentes
- Family: Colubridae
- Genus: Rhadinaea
- Species: R. flavilata

Binomial name
- Rhadinaea flavilata (Cope, 1871)
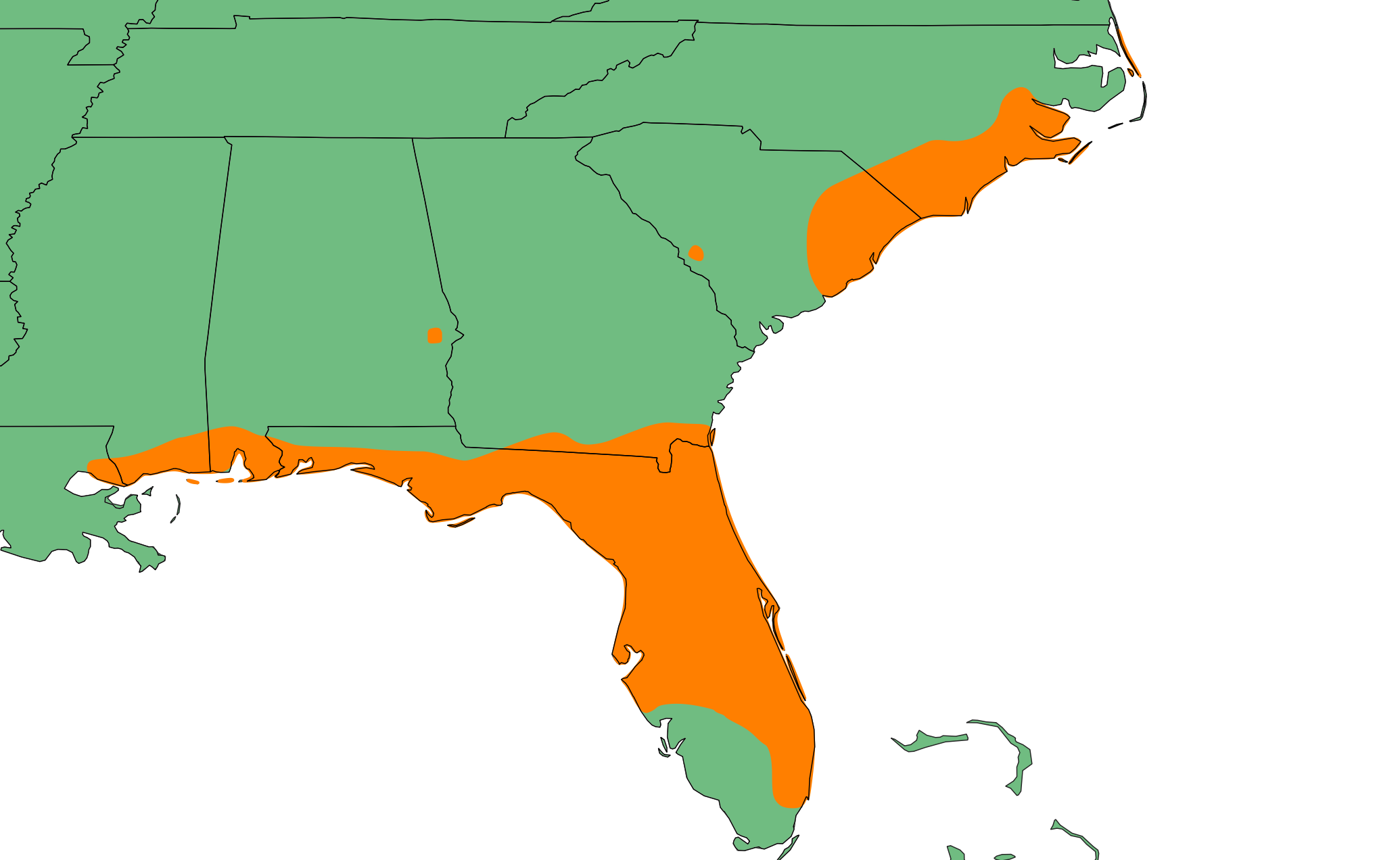

Synonyms
- Dromicus flavilatus Cope, 1871; Liophis flavilatus — Boulenger, 1894; Rhadinæa flavilata — Cope, 1895; Leimadophis flavilatus — Stejneger & Barbour, 1917; Rhadinaea flavilata — Myers, 1974

= Pine woods snake =

Species of snake

The pine woods snake (Rhadinaea flavilata), also commonly known as the yellow-lipped snake and the brown-headed snake, is a secretive species of snake in the subfamily Dipsadinae of the family Colubridae. The species is native to scattered locations across the southeastern United States. Rhadinaea flavilata is rear-fanged and mildly venomous, but not dangerous to humans.

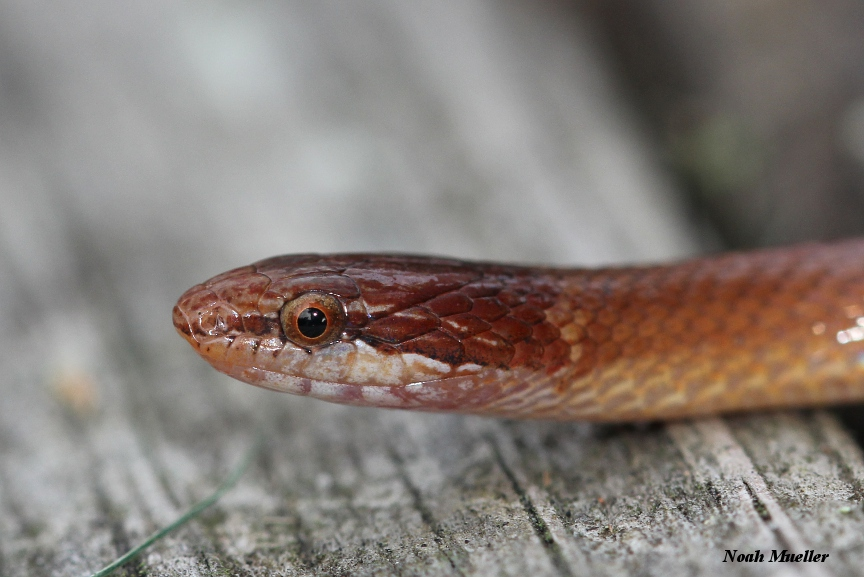
Detail of head

== Description ==
Rhadinaea flavilata is a small reddish brown to yellowish brown or dark orange snake with a whitish to yellowish, unmarked underside. A dark stripe runs through the eye. A light stripe may be present along the middle of the back. The upper labial scales (lip scales) are a whitish or pale yellow color which led to one of its common names, the yellow-lipped snake.

The pine woods snake averages between 10 and 13 inches (25–33 cm) in total length (tail included) at adult size.

== Geographic range ==
Rhadinaea flavilata is found in scattered localities in coastal North Carolina and South Carolina, most of peninsular Florida, and small portions of Georgia, Alabama, Mississippi, and Louisiana.

== Habitat ==
The pine woods snake inhabits pine and mixed-pine hardwood forests. It can be found in damp woodlands, under bark and in rotten logs and stumps. The species has a scattered geographic distribution with large expanses occurring between known populations.

== Behavior and diet ==
Because Rhadinaea flavilata is mainly found in warm coastal areas, it is active for most of the year. It will hibernate underground or in logs in cold winter conditions. There is little information about the diet of R. flavilata. Captive specimens will eat small frogs, salamanders and small lizards.

== Reproduction ==
The pine woods snake lays eggs. There is little information about reproduction. Mating probably occurs in the spring and one to four eggs are laid during the summer months. Some females lay two clutches of eggs each year. The incubation period is six to eight weeks.

== Predators ==
Natural predators of Rhadinaea flavilata include the southern black racer and kingsnakes, as well as carnivorous pine forest animals. Shrews, birds and toads are likely predators. The woods snake does not bite when picked up, but it can release a foul-smelling odor.
