= Rhadinella lisyae =

Scientific classification
- Kingdom: Animalia
- Phylum: Chordata
- Class: Reptilia
- Order: Squamata
- Suborder: Serpentes
- Family: Colubridae
- Genus: Rhadinella
- Species: R. lisyae

Binomial name
- Rhadinella lisyae McCranie, 2017

Species of snake

Rhadinella lisyae is a species of snake in the family Colubridae. It is found in Honduras.
