= Rhadinella kinkelini =

Conservation status
- Least Concern (IUCN 3.1)

Scientific classification
- Kingdom: Animalia
- Phylum: Chordata
- Class: Reptilia
- Order: Squamata
- Suborder: Serpentes
- Family: Colubridae
- Genus: Rhadinella
- Species: R. kinkelini

Binomial name
- Rhadinella kinkelini (Boettger, 1898)

Synonyms
- Rhadinaea kinkelini Boettger, 1898; Rhadinaea veraepacis Stuart & Bailey, 1941; Trimetopon veraepacis (Stuart & Bailey, 1941); Rhadinaea pinicola Mertens, 1952

Species of snake

Rhadinella kinkelini, also known commonly as the Kinkelin graceful brown snake, Kinkelin's graceful brown snake, and la hojarasquera de Kinkelin in Central American Spanish, is a species of snake in the subfamily Dipsadinae of the family Colubridae. The species is native to Central America.

== Etymology ==
The specific name, kinkelini, is in honor of German geologist Georg Friedrich Kinkelin.

== Geographic range ==
R. kinkelini is found in El Salvador, Guatemala, Honduras, Nicaragua, and in extreme southeastern Mexico in the Mexican state of Chiapas.

== Habitat ==
The preferred natural habitat of R. kinkelini is forest.

== Behavior ==
R. kinkelini is terrestrial, and it is both diurnal and nocturnal.

== Reproduction ==
R. kinkelini is oviparous.
