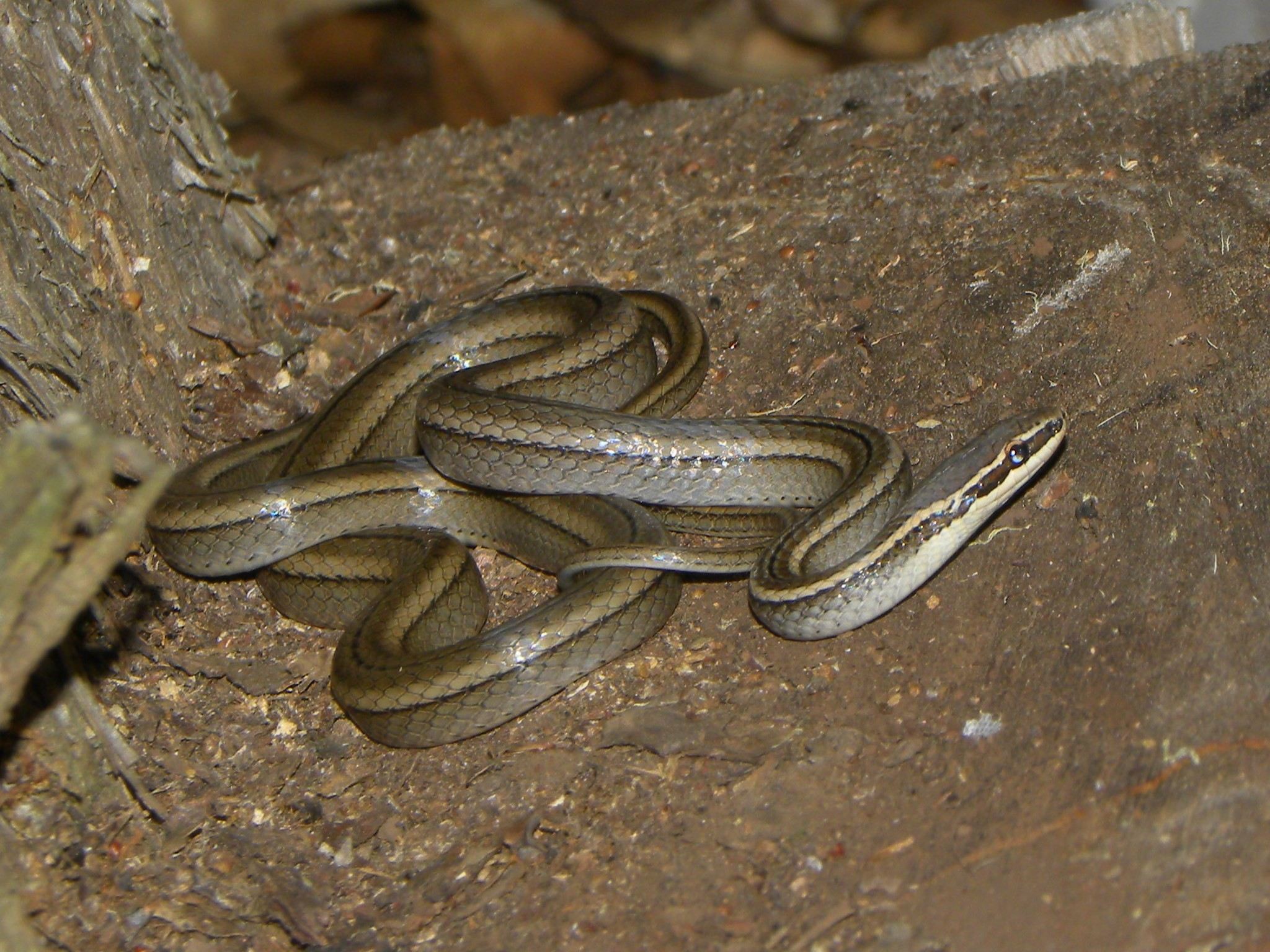

Conservation status
- Data Deficient (IUCN 3.1)

Scientific classification
- Kingdom: Animalia
- Phylum: Chordata
- Class: Reptilia
- Order: Squamata
- Suborder: Serpentes
- Family: Colubridae
- Genus: Rhadinaea
- Species: R. gaigeae

Binomial name
- Rhadinaea gaigeae Bailey, 1937

= Rhadinaea gaigeae =

Species of snake

Rhadinaea gaigeae, also known commonly as Gaige's pine forest snake and la hojarasquera de Gaige in Mexican Spanish, is a species of snake in the subfamily Dipsadinae of the family Colubridae. The species is endemic to Mexico.

== Etymology ==
The specific name, gaigeae, is in honor of American herpetologist Helen Beulah Thompson Gaige.

== Geographic range ==
R. gaigeae is found in the Mexican states of Hidalgo, Querétaro, San Luis Potosí, and Tamaulipas.

== Habitat ==
The preferred natural habitat of R. gaigeae is forest, at altitudes of 200–2,680 m (660–8,790 ft).

== Reproduction ==
R. gaigei is oviparous.
