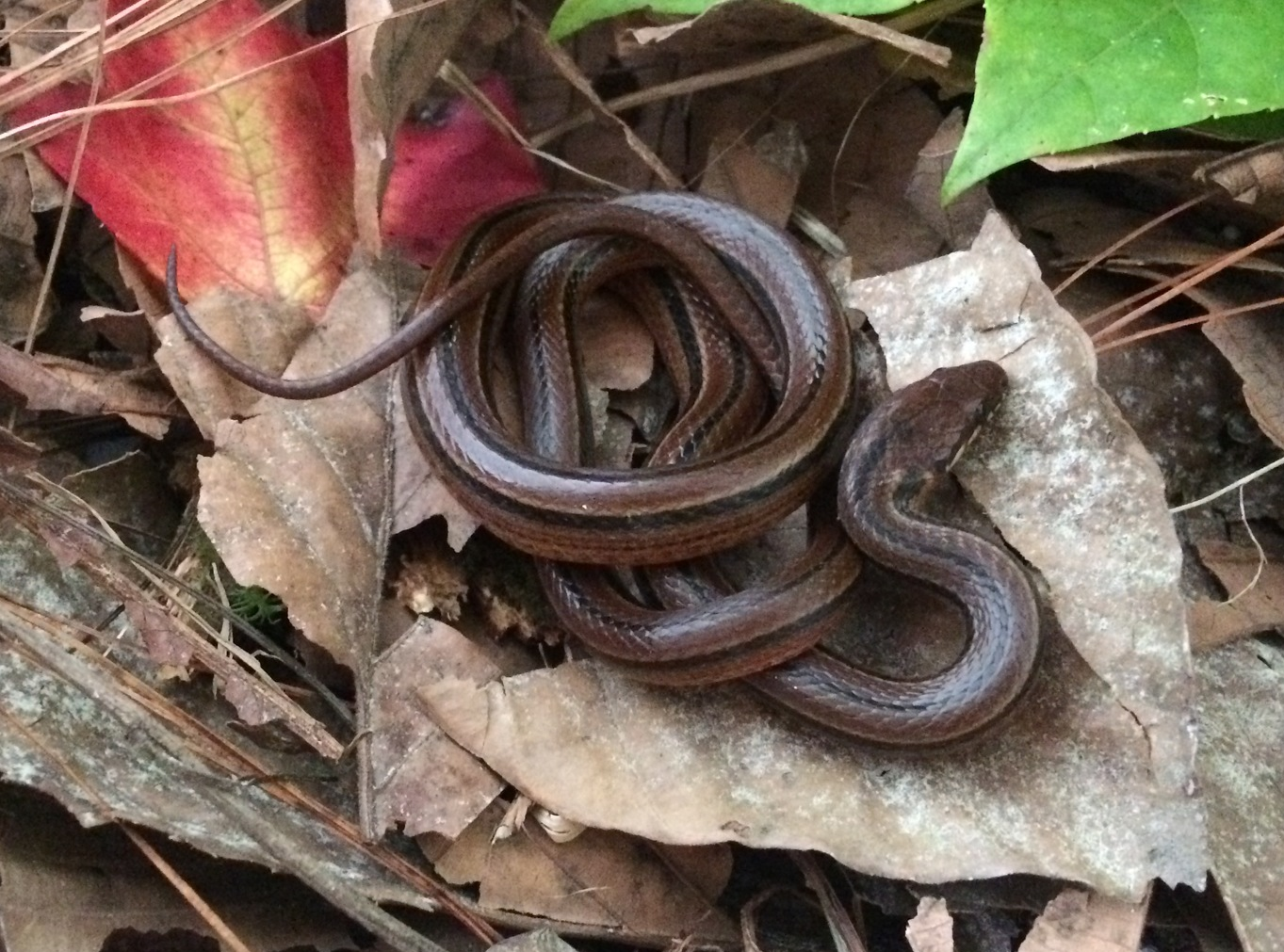

Conservation status
- Vulnerable (IUCN 3.1)

Scientific classification
- Kingdom: Animalia
- Phylum: Chordata
- Class: Reptilia
- Order: Squamata
- Suborder: Serpentes
- Family: Colubridae
- Genus: Rhadinella
- Species: R. pegosalyta

Binomial name
- Rhadinella pegosalyta (McCranie, 2006)

= Rhadinella pegosalyta =

Species of snake

Rhadinella pegosalyta is a species of snake in the family Colubridae. It is found in Honduras.
