= Rhadinella posadasi =

Conservation status
- Endangered (IUCN 3.1)

Scientific classification
- Kingdom: Animalia
- Phylum: Chordata
- Class: Reptilia
- Order: Squamata
- Suborder: Serpentes
- Family: Colubridae
- Genus: Rhadinella
- Species: R. posadasi

Binomial name
- Rhadinella posadasi (Slevin, 1936)

Species of snake

Rhadinella posadasi, Posada's graceful brown snake, is a species of snake in the family Colubridae. It is found in Mexico and Guatemala.
