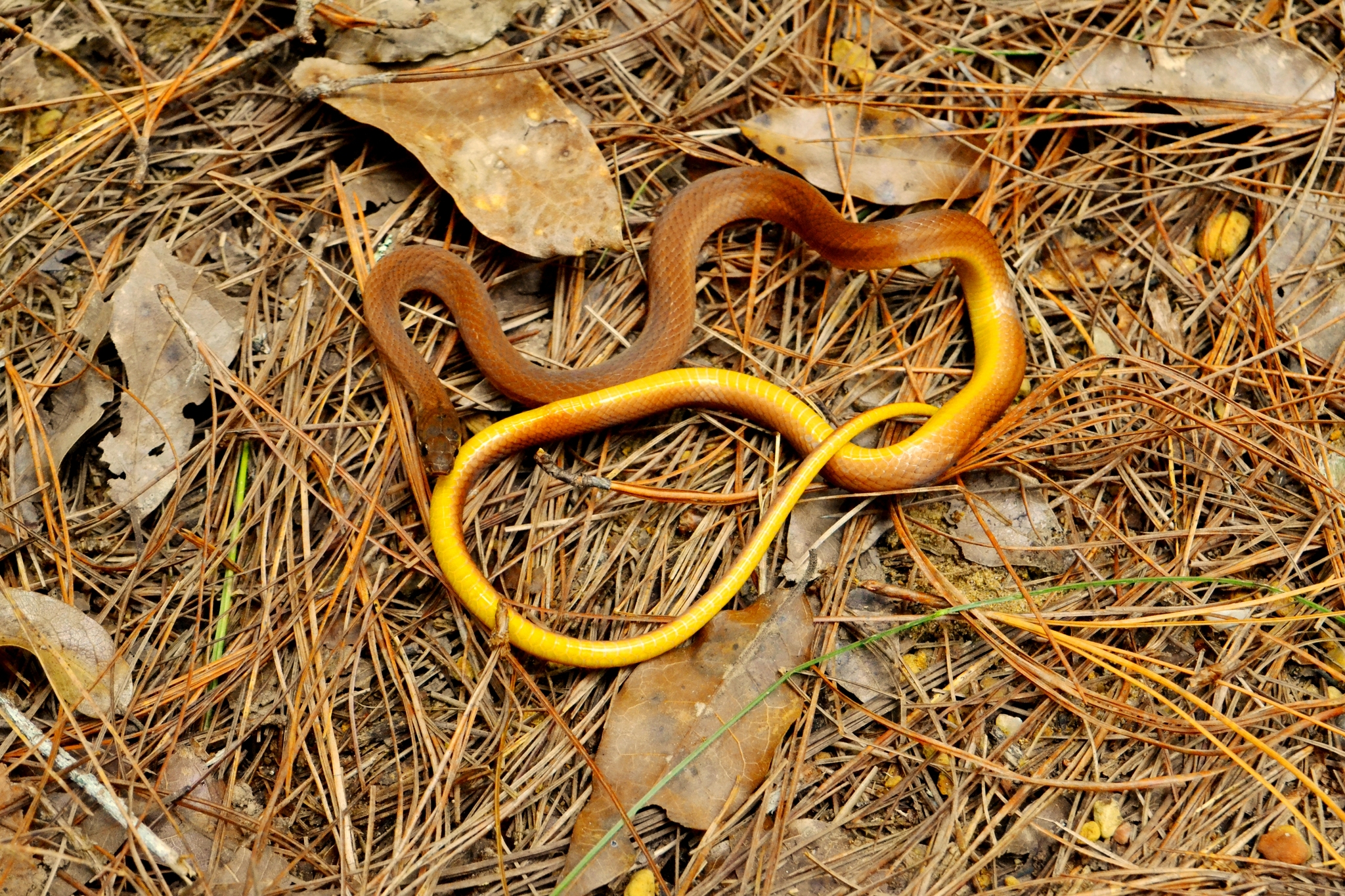

Conservation status
- Data Deficient (IUCN 3.1)

Scientific classification
- Kingdom: Animalia
- Phylum: Chordata
- Class: Reptilia
- Order: Squamata
- Suborder: Serpentes
- Family: Colubridae
- Genus: Rhadinella
- Species: R. kanalchutchan

Binomial name
- Rhadinella kanalchutchan (Mendelson & Kizirian, 1995)

= Rhadinella kanalchutchan =

Species of snake

Rhadinella kanalchutchan, the Kanalchutchan graceful brown snake, is a species of snake in the family Colubridae. It is found in Mexico.
