= Rhadinella dysmica =

Scientific classification
- Domain: Eukaryota
- Kingdom: Animalia
- Phylum: Chordata
- Class: Reptilia
- Order: Squamata
- Suborder: Serpentes
- Family: Colubridae
- Genus: Rhadinella
- Species: R. dysmica

Binomial name
- Rhadinella dysmica Campillo, Davila-Galaviz, Flores-Villela, & Campbell, 2016

Species of snake

Rhadinella dysmica, the Guerrero slender leaf litter snake, is a species of snake in the family Colubridae. It is found in Mexico.
