= Rhadinaea forbesi =

Conservation status
- Data Deficient (IUCN 3.1)

Scientific classification
- Kingdom: Animalia
- Phylum: Chordata
- Class: Reptilia
- Order: Squamata
- Suborder: Serpentes
- Family: Colubridae
- Genus: Rhadinaea
- Species: R. forbesi

Binomial name
- Rhadinaea forbesi H.M. Smith, 1942

Species of snake

Rhadinaea forbesi, also known commonly as Forbes' graceful brown snake and la hojarasquera de Forbes in Mexican Spanish, is a species of snake in the family Colubridae. The species is endemic to Mexico.

== Etymology ==
The specific name, forbesi, is in honor of Dyfrig McHattie Forbes, who was both a Mexican planter and an amateur herpetologist.

== Geographic range ==
R. forbesi is found in the Mexican state of Veracruz.

== Habitat ==
The preferred natural habitat of R. forbesi is forest, at altitudes of 518–1,500 m (1,699–4,921 ft).

== Behavior ==
R. forbesi is terrestrial and fossorial.

== Reproduction ==
R. forbesi is oviparous.
