= Rhadinella lachrymans =

Conservation status
- Least Concern (IUCN 3.1)

Scientific classification
- Kingdom: Animalia
- Phylum: Chordata
- Class: Reptilia
- Order: Squamata
- Suborder: Serpentes
- Family: Colubridae
- Genus: Rhadinella
- Species: R. lachrymans

Binomial name
- Rhadinella lachrymans (Cope, 1870)

Species of snake

Rhadinella lachrymans, the tearful pine-oak snake, is a species of snake in the family Colubridae. It is found in Mexico, Guatemala, and Honduras.
