= Rhadinaea sargenti =

Conservation status
- Least Concern (IUCN 3.1)

Scientific classification
- Kingdom: Animalia
- Phylum: Chordata
- Class: Reptilia
- Order: Squamata
- Suborder: Serpentes
- Family: Colubridae
- Genus: Rhadinaea
- Species: R. sargenti

Binomial name
- Rhadinaea sargenti Dunn & Bailey, 1939

Species of snake

Rhadinaea sargenti, Sargent's graceful brown snake, is a species of snake in the family Colubridae. It is found in Panama.
