= Rhadinella serperaster =

Conservation status
- Least Concern (IUCN 3.1)

Scientific classification
- Kingdom: Animalia
- Phylum: Chordata
- Class: Reptilia
- Order: Squamata
- Suborder: Serpentes
- Family: Colubridae
- Genus: Rhadinella
- Species: R. serperaster

Binomial name
- Rhadinella serperaster (Cope, 1871)

Species of snake

Rhadinella serperaster is a species of snake in the family Colubridae. It is found in Costa Rica.
