= Rhadinella rogerromani =

Conservation status
- Near Threatened (IUCN 3.1)

Scientific classification
- Kingdom: Animalia
- Phylum: Chordata
- Class: Reptilia
- Order: Squamata
- Suborder: Serpentes
- Family: Colubridae
- Genus: Rhadinella
- Species: R. rogerromani

Binomial name
- Rhadinella rogerromani (G. Köhler & McCranie, 1999)

Species of snake

Rhadinella rogerromani is a species of snake in the family Colubridae. It is found in Nicaragua.
