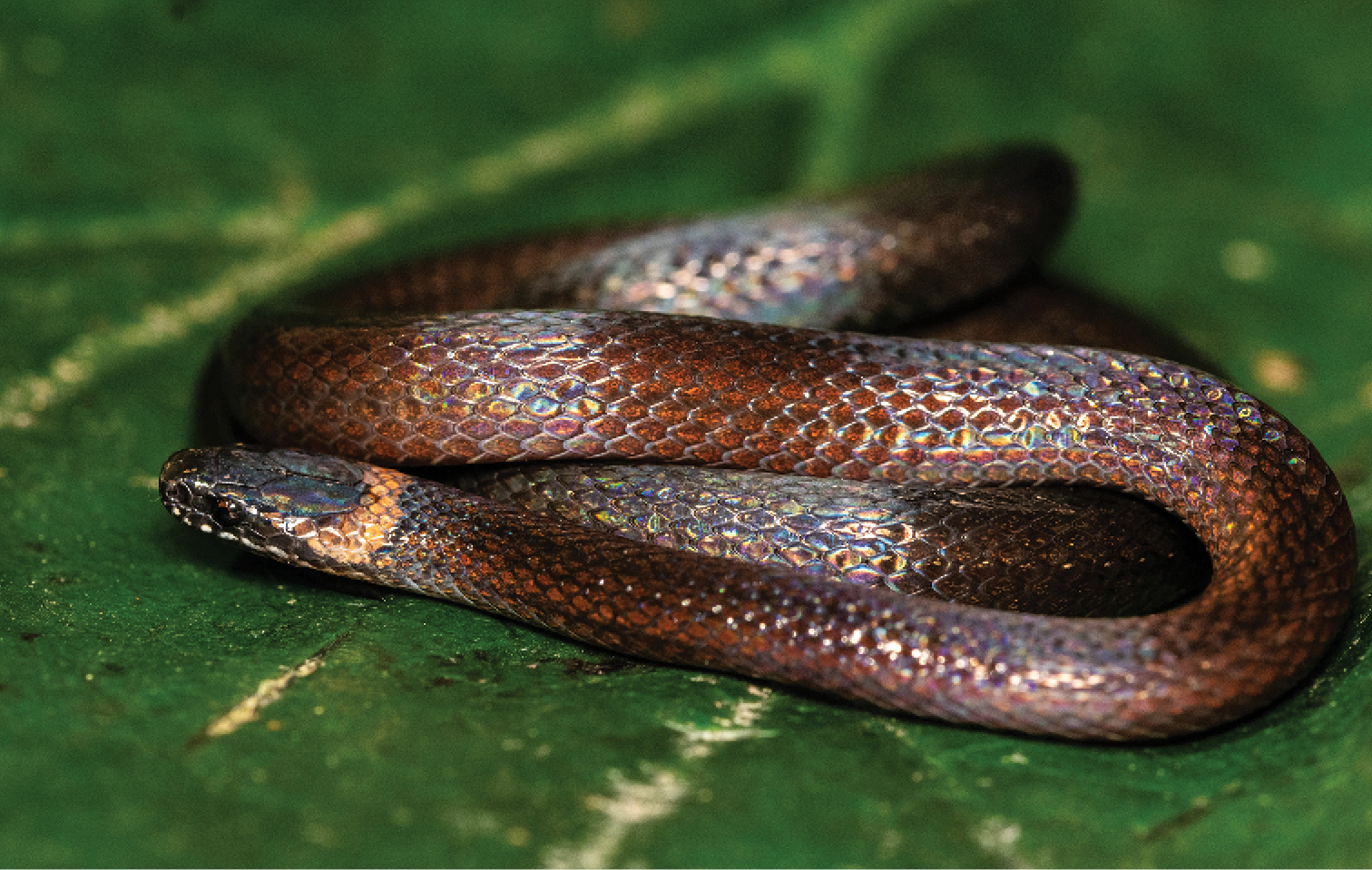

Conservation status
- Least Concern (IUCN 3.1)

Scientific classification
- Kingdom: Animalia
- Phylum: Chordata
- Class: Reptilia
- Order: Squamata
- Suborder: Serpentes
- Family: Colubridae
- Genus: Rhadinella
- Species: R. schistosa

Binomial name
- Rhadinella schistosa H.M. Smith, 1941

= Rhadinella schistosa =

Species of snake

Rhadinella schistosa, the brokencollar graceful brown snake, is a species of snake in the family Colubridae. It is found in Mexico.
