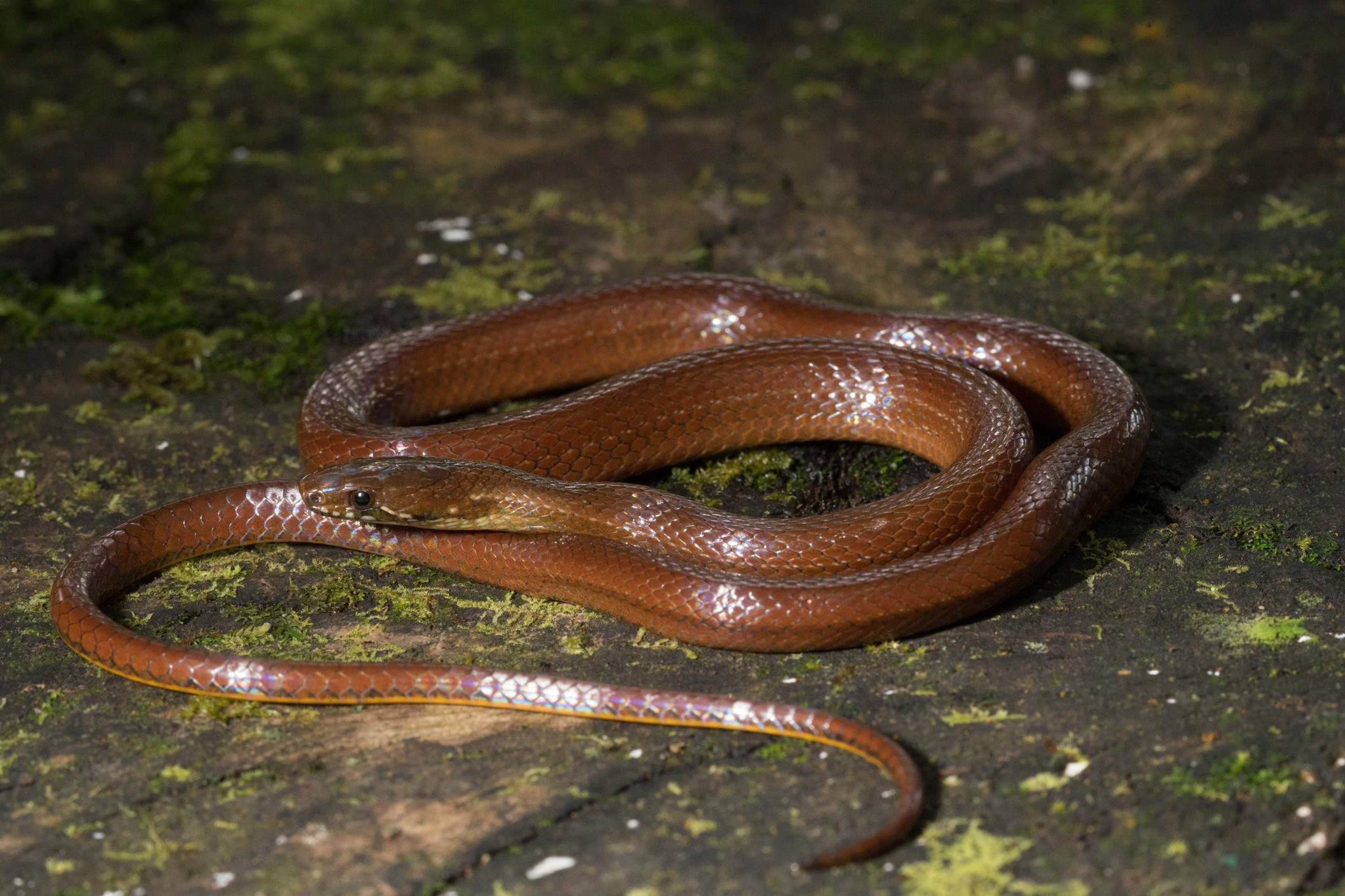

Conservation status
- Endangered (IUCN 3.1)

Scientific classification
- Kingdom: Animalia
- Phylum: Chordata
- Class: Reptilia
- Order: Squamata
- Suborder: Serpentes
- Family: Colubridae
- Genus: Rhadinella
- Species: R. hempsteadae

Binomial name
- Rhadinella hempsteadae (L.C. Stuart & Bailey, 1941)

Synonyms
- Rhadinaea hempsteadae Stuart & Bailey, 1941; Rhadinella hempsteadae — Myers, 2011

= Rhadinella hempsteadae =

Species of snake

Rhadinella hempsteadae, also known commonly as Hempstead's pine woods snake, is a species of snake in the subfamily Dipsadinae of the family Colubridae. The species is endemic to Guatemala.

== Etymology ==
The specific name, hempsteadae, is in honor of Guatemalan coffee planter Maria Luisa Hempstead.

== Habitat ==
The preferred natural habitat of R. hempsteadae is forest, at altitudes of 1,600–2,600 m (5,200–8,500 ft).

== Description ==
The holotype of R. hempsteadae, an adult male, has a snout-to-vent length (SVL) of 266 mm (10.5 in), plus a tail length of 128 mm (5.0 in).

== Behavior ==
R. hempsteadae is terrestrial and fossorial.

== Reproduction ==
R. hempsteadae is oviparous.
