= Rhadinaea vermiculaticeps =

Conservation status
- Near Threatened (IUCN 3.1)

Scientific classification
- Kingdom: Animalia
- Phylum: Chordata
- Class: Reptilia
- Order: Squamata
- Suborder: Serpentes
- Family: Colubridae
- Genus: Rhadinaea
- Species: R. vermiculaticeps

Binomial name
- Rhadinaea vermiculaticeps (Cope, 1860)

Species of snake

Rhadinaea vermiculaticeps, the vermiculate graceful brown snake, is a species of snake in the family Colubridae. It is found in Panama.
