= Rhadinaea marcellae =

Conservation status
- Endangered (IUCN 3.1)

Scientific classification
- Kingdom: Animalia
- Phylum: Chordata
- Class: Reptilia
- Order: Squamata
- Suborder: Serpentes
- Family: Colubridae
- Genus: Rhadinaea
- Species: R. marcellae

Binomial name
- Rhadinaea marcellae Taylor, 1949

Species of snake

Rhadinaea marcellae, also known commonly as Marcella's graceful brown snake and la hojarasquera de Marcella in Mexican Spanish, is a species of snake in the subfamily Dipsadinae of the family Colubridae. The species is native to eastern and central Mexico.

== Etymology ==
The specific name, marcellae, is in honor of Marcella Newman who was the wife of American ornithologist Robert J. Newman.

== Geographic range ==
Rhadinaea marcellae is found in the Mexican states of Hidalgo, Puebla, San Luis Potosí, and Veracruz.

== Habitat ==
The natural habitat of Rhadinaea marcellae is montane cloud forest, at altitudes of 1,000–1,600 m (3,300–5,200 ft).

== Diet ==
Rhadinaea marcellae preys upon salamanders.

== Reproduction ==
Rhadinaea marcellae is oviparous.
