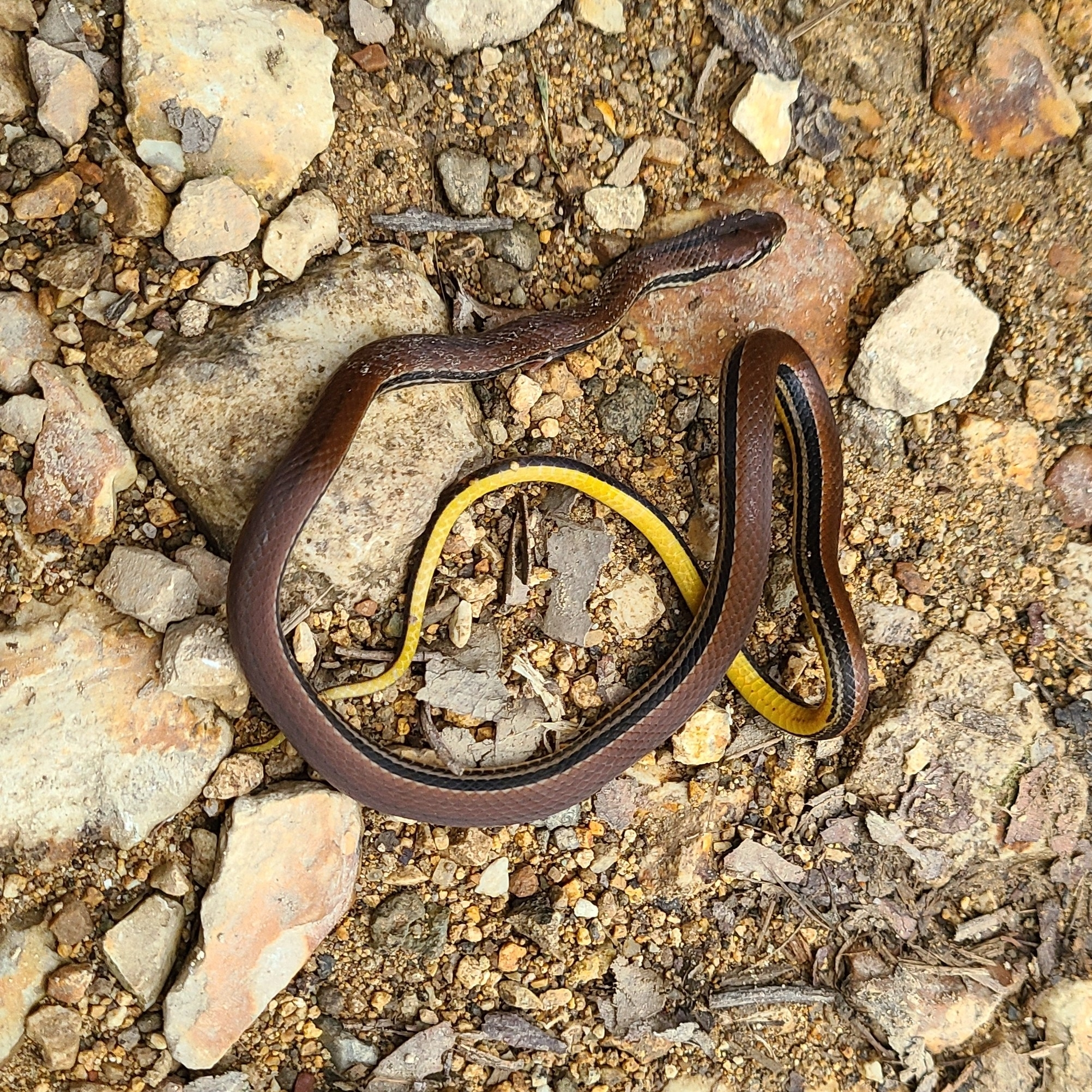

Conservation status
- Vulnerable (IUCN 3.1)

Scientific classification
- Kingdom: Animalia
- Phylum: Chordata
- Class: Reptilia
- Order: Squamata
- Suborder: Serpentes
- Family: Colubridae
- Genus: Rhadinella
- Species: R. montecristi

Binomial name
- Rhadinella montecristi (Mertens, 1952)

= Rhadinella montecristi =

Species of snake

Rhadinella montecristi, the Monte Cristi graceful brown snake, is a species of snake in the family Colubridae. It is found in Guatemala, Honduras, and El Salvador.
