= Rhadinella stadelmani =

Conservation status
- Endangered (IUCN 3.1)

Scientific classification
- Kingdom: Animalia
- Phylum: Chordata
- Class: Reptilia
- Order: Squamata
- Suborder: Serpentes
- Family: Colubridae
- Genus: Rhadinella
- Species: R. stadelmani

Binomial name
- Rhadinella stadelmani (L.C. Stuart & Bailey, 1941)

Species of snake

Rhadinella stadelmani, Stadelman's pine woods snake, is a species of snake in the family Colubridae. It is found in Guatemala.
