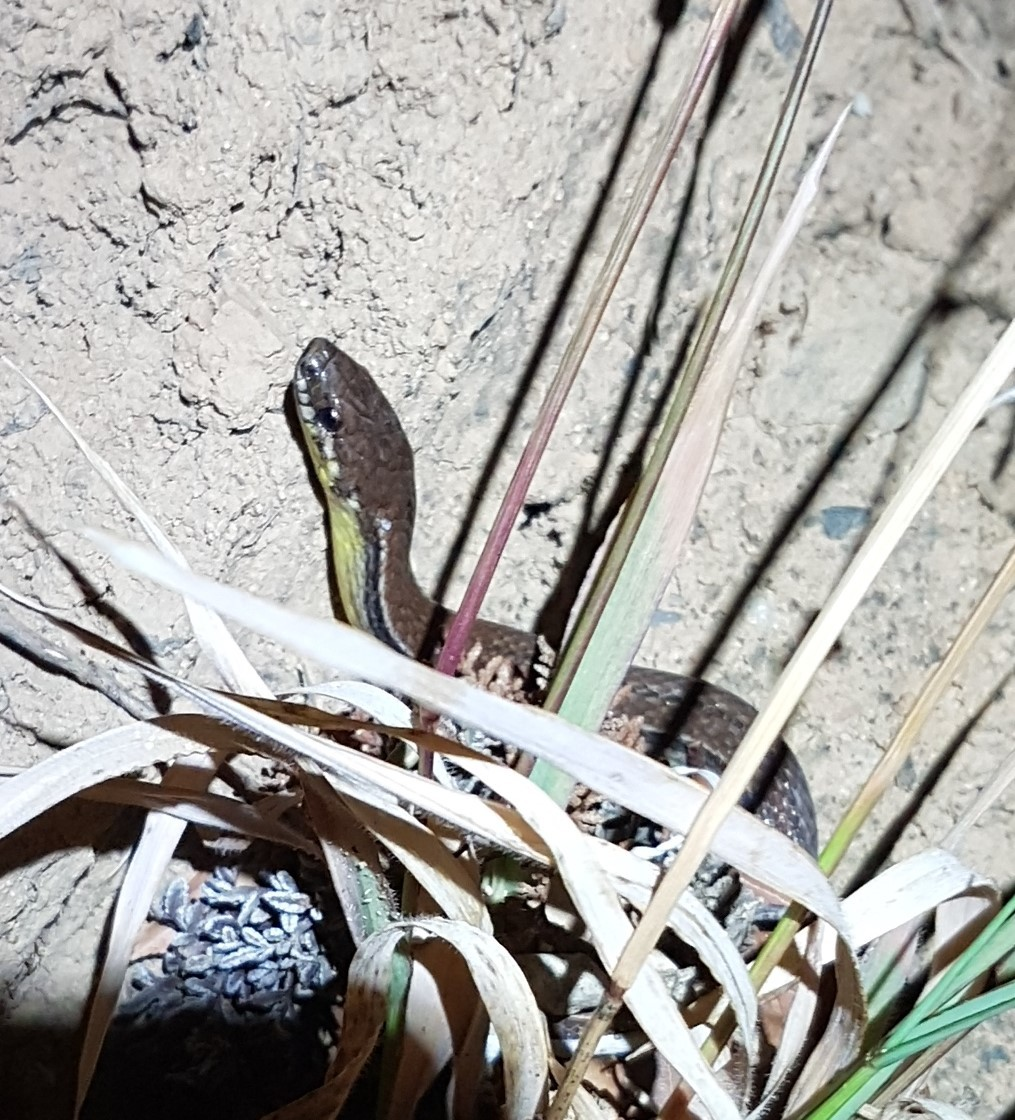

Conservation status
- Least Concern (IUCN 3.1)

Scientific classification
- Kingdom: Animalia
- Phylum: Chordata
- Class: Reptilia
- Order: Squamata
- Suborder: Serpentes
- Family: Colubridae
- Genus: Rhadinella
- Species: R. godmani

Binomial name
- Rhadinella godmani (Günther, 1865)

Synonyms
- Dromicus godmanni [sic] Günther, 1865; Rhadinæa godmanni — Cope, 1876; Coronella godmani [sic] Günther, 1893 (emendation); Rhadinæa godmani — Boulenger, 1894; Rhadinaea altamontana Taylor, 1954; Rhadinaea binfordi Rossman, 1965; Rhadinaea godmani — J. Peters & Orejas-Miranda, 1970; Rhadinella godmani — C. Myers, 2011

= Rhadinella godmani =

Species of snake

Rhadinella godmani, also known commonly as Godman's graceful brown snake, and as la culebra-café de Godman and la lagartijerita de Godman in American Spanish, is a species of snake in the subfamily Dipsadinae of the family Colubridae. The species is native to Central America and southern Mexico. There are two recognized subspecies.

== Geographic range ==
R. godmani is found in extreme southeastern Mexico, in the Mexican states of Chiapas and Oaxaca, and in Guatemala, Honduras, Nicaragua, El Salvador, Costa Rica, and Panama.

== Habitat ==
The preferred natural habitat of R. godmani is forest, at altitudes of 1,200–2,650 m (3,940–8,690 ft), but has also been found in pasture land.

== Description ==
The longest specimen in the type series of R. godmani has total length of 44.5 cm (17.5 in), which includes a tail 13 cm (5.1 in) long. The dorsal scales are arranged in 21 rows throughout the length of the body.

== Reproduction ==
R. godmani is oviparous.

== Subspecies ==
Two subspecies are recognized as being valid, including the nominotypical subspecies.

- Rhadinella godmani godmani (Günther, 1865)
- Rhadinella godmani zilchi (Mertens, 1952)

Nota bene: A trinomial authority in parentheses indicates that the subspecies was originally described in a genus other than Rhadinella.

== Etymology ==
The specific name, godmani, is in honor of British naturalist Frederick DuCane Godman.

The subspecific name, zilchi, is in honor of German malacologist Adolf Michael Zilch.
