= Rhadinaea montana =

Conservation status
- Endangered (IUCN 3.1)

Scientific classification
- Kingdom: Animalia
- Phylum: Chordata
- Class: Reptilia
- Order: Squamata
- Suborder: Serpentes
- Family: Colubridae
- Genus: Rhadinaea
- Species: R. montana

Binomial name
- Rhadinaea montana H.M. Smith, 1944

Species of snake

Rhadinaea montana, the Nuevo León graceful brown snake, is a species of snake in the family Colubridae. It is found in Mexico.
