= Rhadinaea taeniata =

Conservation status
- Least Concern (IUCN 3.1)

Scientific classification
- Kingdom: Animalia
- Phylum: Chordata
- Class: Reptilia
- Order: Squamata
- Suborder: Serpentes
- Family: Colubridae
- Genus: Rhadinaea
- Species: R. taeniata

Binomial name
- Rhadinaea taeniata (Peters, 1863)

Species of snake

Rhadinaea taeniata, the pine-oak snake, is a species of snake in the family Colubridae. It is found in Mexico.
