= Rhadinaea cuneata =

Conservation status
- Data Deficient (IUCN 3.1)

Scientific classification
- Kingdom: Animalia
- Phylum: Chordata
- Class: Reptilia
- Order: Squamata
- Suborder: Serpentes
- Family: Colubridae
- Genus: Rhadinaea
- Species: R. cuneata

Binomial name
- Rhadinaea cuneata C. Myers, 1974

Species of snake

Rhadinaea cuneata, the Veracruz graceful brown snake, is a species of snake in the family Colubridae. It is found in Mexico.
