= Rhadinaea pulveriventris =

Conservation status
- Data Deficient (IUCN 3.1)

Scientific classification
- Kingdom: Animalia
- Phylum: Chordata
- Class: Reptilia
- Order: Squamata
- Suborder: Serpentes
- Family: Colubridae
- Genus: Rhadinaea
- Species: R. pulveriventris

Binomial name
- Rhadinaea pulveriventris Boulenger, 1896

Species of snake

Rhadinaea pulveriventris, the common graceful brown snake, is a species of snake in the family Colubridae. It is found in Costa Rica and Panama.
