= Rhadinella donaji =

Scientific classification
- Domain: Eukaryota
- Kingdom: Animalia
- Phylum: Chordata
- Class: Reptilia
- Order: Squamata
- Suborder: Serpentes
- Family: Colubridae
- Genus: Rhadinella
- Species: R. donaji

Binomial name
- Rhadinella donaji Campbell, 2015

Species of snake

Rhadinella donaji is a species of snake in the family Colubridae. It is found in Mexico.
