= Rhadinaea bogertorum =

Conservation status
- Data Deficient (IUCN 3.1)

Scientific classification
- Kingdom: Animalia
- Phylum: Chordata
- Class: Reptilia
- Order: Squamata
- Suborder: Serpentes
- Family: Colubridae
- Genus: Rhadinaea
- Species: R. bogertorum

Binomial name
- Rhadinaea bogertorum C. Myers, 1974

Species of snake

Rhadinaea bogertorum, also known commonly as the Oaxacan graceful brown snake and la hojarasquera de Oaxaca in Mexican Spanish, is a species of snake in the family Colubridae. The species is native to Mexico.

== Etymology ==
The specific name, bogertorum (genetive plural), is in honor of American herpetologist Charles Mitchill Bogert and his wife Martha.

== Geographic range ==
R. bogertorum is endemic to the Mexican state of Oaxaca.

== Habitat ==
The preferred natural habitat of R. bogertorum is forest.

== Description ==
The holotype of R. bogertorum has a total length of 44.8 cm (17.6 in), which includes a tail length of 13.3 cm (5.2 in). The dorsal scales are smooth, without apical pits, and in 17 rows throughout the length of the body.

== Reproduction ==
R. bogertorum is oviparous.
