= Rhadinella pilonaorum =

Conservation status
- Near Threatened (IUCN 3.1)

Scientific classification
- Kingdom: Animalia
- Phylum: Chordata
- Class: Reptilia
- Order: Squamata
- Suborder: Serpentes
- Family: Colubridae
- Genus: Rhadinella
- Species: R. pilonaorum

Binomial name
- Rhadinella pilonaorum (L.C. Stuart, 1954)

Species of snake

Rhadinella pilonaorum, Stuart's graceful brown snake, is a species of snake in the family Colubridae. It is found in El Salvador and Guatemala.
