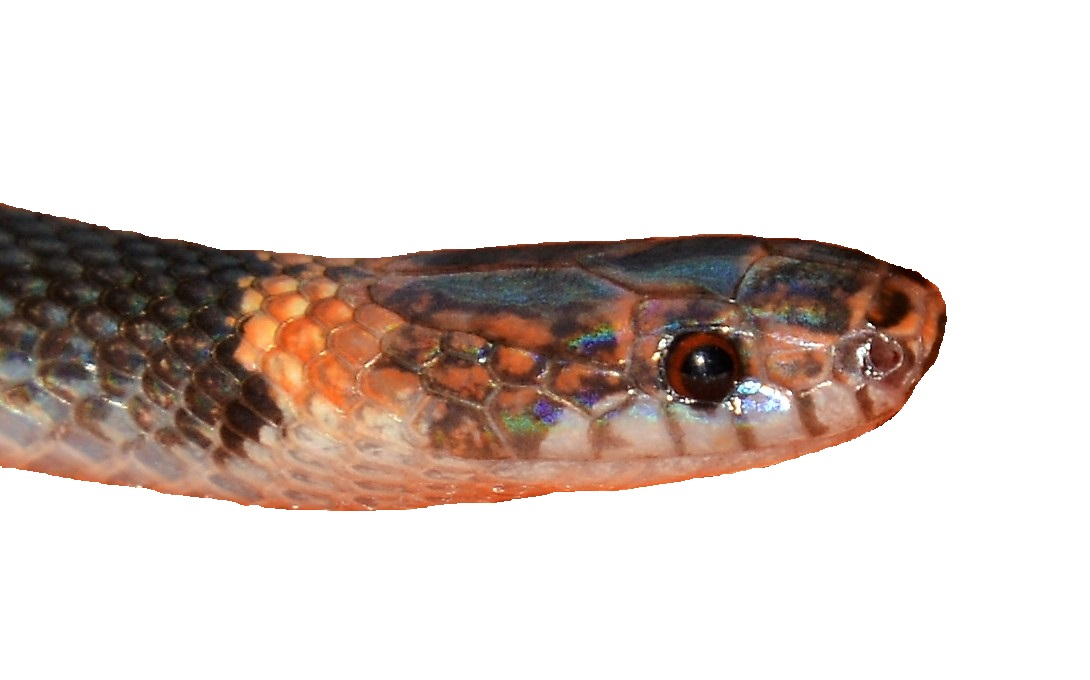

Scientific classification
- Kingdom: Animalia
- Phylum: Chordata
- Class: Reptilia
- Order: Squamata
- Suborder: Serpentes
- Family: Colubridae
- Genus: Rhadinella
- Species: R. xerophila

Binomial name
- Rhadinella xerophila Ariano-Sánchez & Campbell, 2018

= Rhadinella xerophila =

Species of snake from Guatemala

Rhadinella xerophila is a very rare snake endemic to the seasonally dry forests and thornscrub of the Middle Motagua Valley in Guatemala. This snake is characterized by its orange auburn head and its small size. This species is related to the group of Rhadinella that have dark dorsal coloration, which mostly or completely obscures a pattern of longitudinal striping characteristic of the majority of species of Rhadinella. This species has dark gray, almost black, dorsal coloration with barely discernible slightly darker striping. Top of the head is mostly blackish with irregular auburn-orange markings on the internasals, prefrontals, frontal, parietals, loreals, postoculars, temporals, and two ultimate supralabials. Most conspicuous features are an orange-auburn Y-shaped marking along frontal-parietal and interparietal sutures, followed by an orange nuchal collar. The closest relative of the new species, based on morphological similarities, appears to be Rhadinella pilonaorum, which occurs in a relatively mesic habitat of pine-oak forest located about 90 km southwest from the type-locality of the new species. It has been recorded only at Heloderma Natural Reserve, El Arenal, Zacapa, Guatemala.
