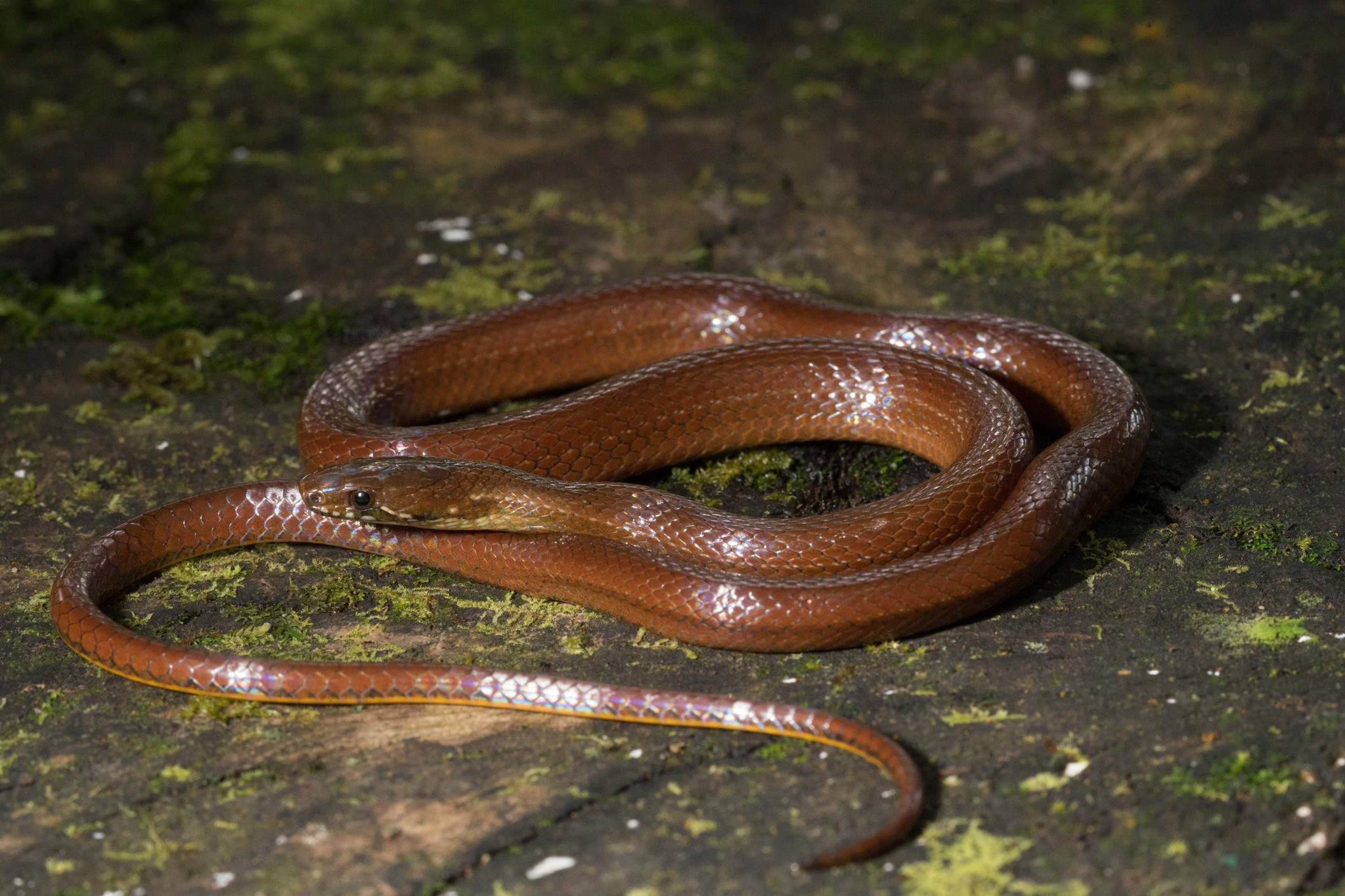
- R. hempsteadae in Guatemala

Scientific classification
- Kingdom: Animalia
- Phylum: Chordata
- Class: Reptilia
- Order: Squamata
- Suborder: Serpentes
- Family: Colubridae
- Subfamily: Dipsadinae
- Genus: Rhadinella; H.M. Smith, 1941

= Rhadinella =

Genus of snakes

Rhadinella is a genus of snakes of the subfamily Dipsadinae.

== Geographic range ==
The genus Rhadinella is endemic to Mexico and Central America.

== Species ==
The following 20 species are recognized as being valid.

- Rhadinella anachoreta (E.N. Smith & Campbell, 1994)
- Rhadinella donaji Campbell, 2015
- Rhadinella dysmica Campillo et al., 2016 – Guerrero slender leaf litter snake
- Rhadinella godmani (Günther, 1865) – Godman's graceful brown snake
- Rhadinella hannsteini (Stuart, 1949) – Hannstein's spot-lipped snake
- Rhadinella hempsteadae (Stuart & Bailey, 1941) – Hempstead's pine woods snake
- Rhadinella kanalchutchan (Mendelson & Kizirian, 1995) – Kanalchutchan graceful brown snake
- Rhadinella kinkelini (Boettger, 1898) – Kinkelin's graceful brown snake
- Rhadinella lachrymans (Cope, 1870) – tearful pine-oak snake
- Rhadinella lisyae McCranie, 2017
- Rhadinella montecristi (Mertens, 1952) – Monte Cristi graceful brown snake
- Rhadinella pegosalyta (McCranie, 2006)
- Rhadinella pilonaorum (Stuart, 1954) – Stuart's graceful brown snake
- Rhadinella posadasi (Slevin, 1936) – Posada's graceful brown snake
- Rhadinella rogerromani (G. Köhler & McCranie, 1999)
- Rhadinella schistosa H.M. Smith, 1941 – brokencollar graceful brown snake
- Rhadinella serperaster (Cope, 1871)
- Rhadinella stadelmani Stuart & Bailey, 1941 – Stadelman's pine woods snake
- Rhadinella tolpanorum (Holm & Cruz, 1994)
- Rhadinella xerophila Ariano-Sánchez & Campbell, 2018

Nota bene: A binomial authority in parentheses indicates that the species was originally described in a genus other than Rhadinella.
