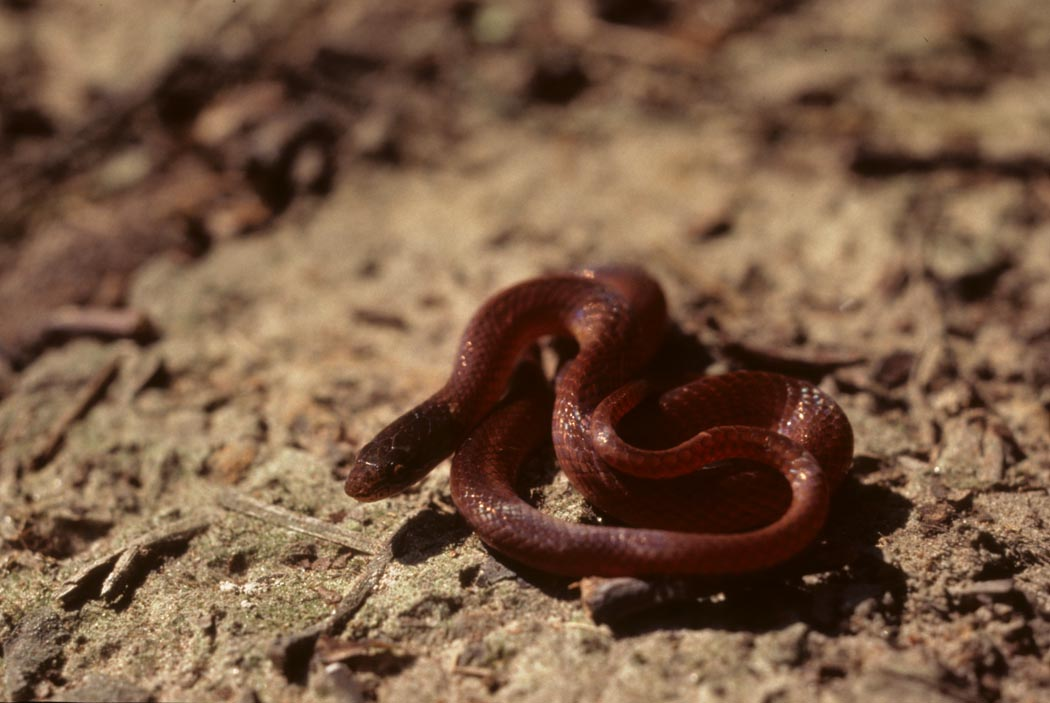
- Rhadinaea flavilata

Scientific classification
- Kingdom: Animalia
- Phylum: Chordata
- Class: Reptilia
- Order: Squamata
- Suborder: Serpentes
- Family: Colubridae
- Subfamily: Dipsadinae
- Genus: Rhadinaea; Cope, 1863

= Rhadinaea =

Genus of snakes

Rhadinaea is a genus of snakes of the family Colubridae.

== Species ==
The following 21 species are recognized as being valid.

- Rhadinaea bogertorum C. Myers, 1974 – Oaxacan graceful brown snake
- Rhadinaea calligaster (Cope, 1876) – thick graceful brown snake
- Rhadinaea cuneata C. Myers, 1974 – Veracruz graceful brown snake
- Rhadinaea decorata (Günther, 1858) – adorned graceful brown snake
- Rhadinaea flavilata (Cope, 1871) – pine woods snake
- Rhadinaea forbesi H.M. Smith, 1942 – Forbes's graceful brown snake
- Rhadinaea fulvivittis Cope, 1875 – ribbon graceful brown snake
- Rhadinaea gaigeae Bailey, 1937 – Gaige's pine forest snake
- Rhadinaea hesperia Bailey, 1940 – western graceful brown snake
- Rhadinaea laureata (Günther, 1868) – crowned graceful brown snake
- Rhadinaea macdougalli H.M. Smith & Langebartel, 1949 – MacDougall's graceful brown snake
- Rhadinaea marcellae Taylor, 1949 – Marcella's graceful brown snake
- Rhadinaea montana H.M. Smith, 1944 – Nuevo León graceful brown snake
- Rhadinaea myersi Rossman, 1965 – Myers's graceful brown snake
- Rhadinaea nuchalis Gárcia-Vázquez, Pavón-Vázquez, Blancas-Hernández, Blancas-Calva & Centenero-Alcalá, 2018
- Rhadinaea omiltemana (Günther, 1894) – Guerreran pine woods snake
- Rhadinaea pulveriventris Boulenger, 1896 – common graceful brown snake
- Rhadinaea quinquelineata Cope, 1886 – Pueblan graceful brown snake
- Rhadinaea sargenti Dunn & Bailey, 1939 – Sargent's graceful brown snake
- Rhadinaea taeniata (W. Peters, 1863) – pine-oak snake
- Rhadinaea vermiculaticeps (Cope, 1860) – vermiculate graceful brown snake

Nota bene: A binomial authority in parentheses indicates that the species was originally described in a genus other than Rhadinaea.
