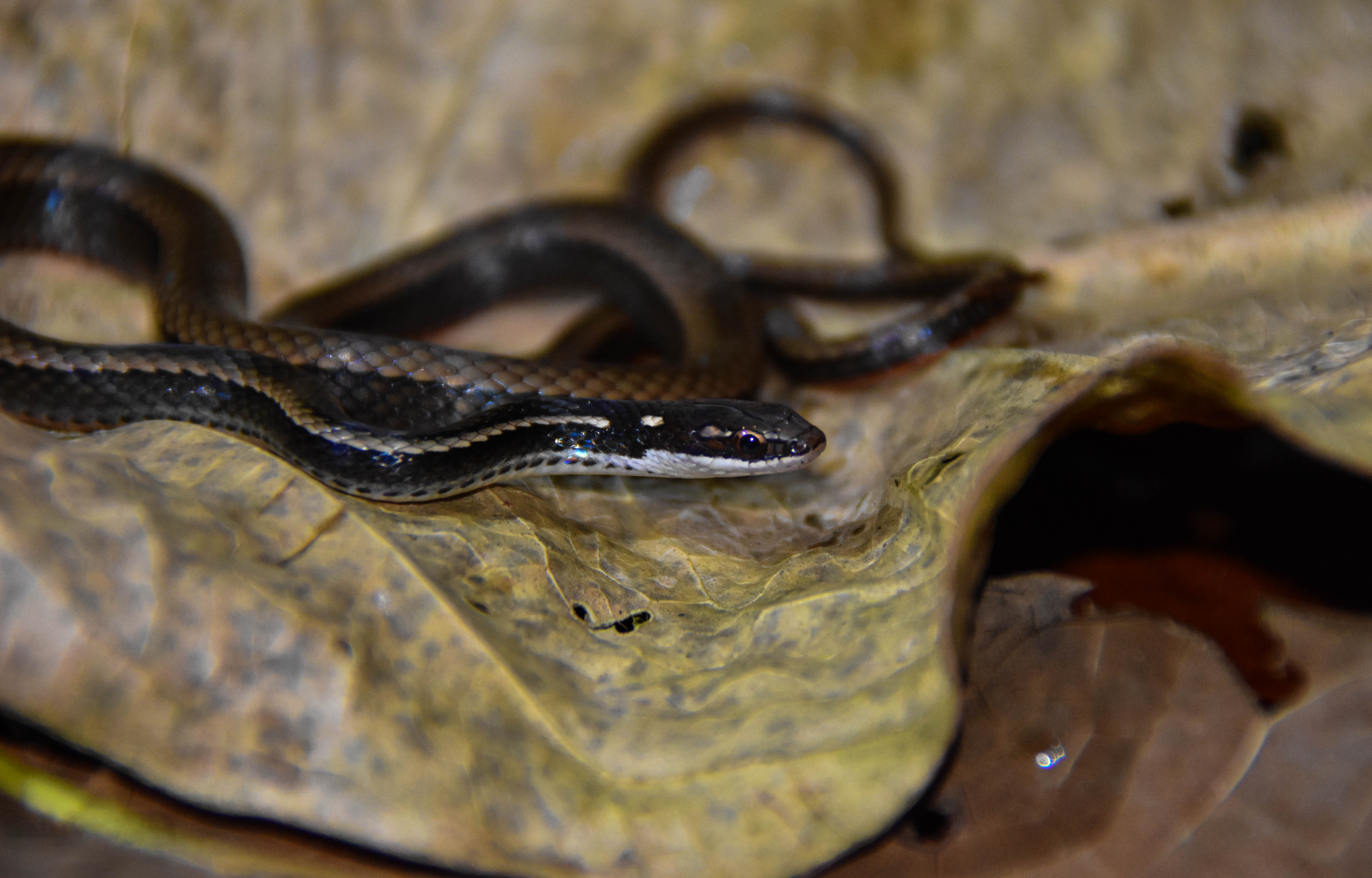

Conservation status
- Least Concern (IUCN 3.1)

Scientific classification
- Kingdom: Animalia
- Phylum: Chordata
- Class: Reptilia
- Order: Squamata
- Suborder: Serpentes
- Family: Colubridae
- Genus: Rhadinaea
- Species: R. decorata

Binomial name
- Rhadinaea decorata (Günther, 1858)

= Rhadinaea decorata =

Species of snake

Rhadinaea decorata, the adorned graceful brown snake, is a species of snake in the family Colubridae. It is found in Central and South America.

== Etymology ==
The name Rhadinaea comes from the greek word for slender. The species name decorata was given to the snake for the white markings on its head means "decorated or adorned".

== Description ==
Snakes of this species are generally brown in color, with dark lines down the sides of their bodies and oftentimes another similar marking down the spine. These two dark streaks are often separated by another stripe that is tan in color. A white marking behind the eyes serve as the species' namesake. In species that are more southern in distribution, this marking is longer and continuous along the rest of the body.

Notable features of Rhadinaea decorata include a long tail, taking up a maximum of 47% of its body. They are also known to have a smaller number of ventral scales to other species, with scientists counting between 110 and 134 scales on collected specimens.

Rhadinaea decorata can get as long as 470 mm long, however lengths exceeding 400 mm are atypical.

R. decorata typically has about 20 maxillary teeth, then followed by two larger posterior teeth.

== Distribution and habitat ==
=== Geographic range ===
R. decorata has been found from central Mexico to as far south as Ecuador. It is one of the most widely distributed species of its genus. It is mostly found in the Atlantic watershed, with a few specimens from the Pacific side in Costa Rica. Rhadinaea decorata is the only species of its group not endemic to Mexico.

== Behavior and ecology ==
=== Diet ===
Rhadinaea decorata has been observed preying on small amphibians and their eggs, such as the salamander Bolitoglossa rufescens and the treefrog Agalychis moreletii. They have also been seen eating earthworms. There are also multiple records of the snakes preying on strawberry poison-dart frogs (Oophaga pumilio), despite their potent toxicity.

=== Reproduction ===
Through various studies, evidence has been found to suggest that R. decorata breed throughout most of the year. They do not appear, however, to lay more than one small clutch of eggs annually.

=== Defensive behavior ===
There have been at least two observations of death feigning in R. decorata. One event included the snake discharging a foul-smelling substance from its cloaca, known as musk. They have also been found to exhibit tail autonomy. Not only has this behavior been observed, but snakes have also been found portions of their tails missing.
